= List of ship launches in 1941 =

The list of ship launches in 1941 includes a chronological list of ships launched in 1941. In cases where no official launching ceremony was held, the date built or completed may be used instead.

Date	Ship	Class	Builder	Location	Country	Notes
10 January	Teddington	Cargo ship	Caledon Shipbuilding & Engineering Co. Ltd.	Dundee	United Kingdom	For Britain Steamship Co.
12 January	Bardell	Bar-class boom defence vessel	Blyth Dry Docks & Shipbuilding Co. Ltd	Blyth, Northumberland	United Kingdom	For Royal Navy.
13 January	Cape Verde	Cargo ship	Lithgows Ltd.	Port Glasgow	United Kingdom	For Cape of Good Hope Motorship Co Ltd.
13 January	Empire Surf	Cargo ship	Bartram & Sons Ltd	Sunderland	United Kingdom	For Ministry of Supply.
14 January	Oribi	O-class destroyer	Fairfield Shipbuilding and Engineering Company	Govan	United Kingdom	For Royal Navy
14 January	Palma	Refrigerated cargo ship	Harland & Wolff	Belfast	United Kingdom	For Royal Mail Line.
15 January	Anchusa	Flower-class corvette	Harland & Wolff	Belfast	United Kingdom	For Royal Navy.
15 January	Empire Creek	Coaster	James Pollock & Sons	Faversham, Kent	United Kingdom	For Ministry of Supply.
15 January	Underwood	Cargo ship	Henry Robb Ltd.	Leith	United Kingdom	For Union Steamship Company of New Zealand Ltd. Requisitioned by Ministry of War Transport on completion.
16 January	Armeria	Flower-class corvette	Harland & Wolff	Belfast	United Kingdom	For Royal Navy.
16 January	Empire Sunbeam	Cargo ship	William Gray & Co. Ltd.	West Hartlepool	United Kingdom	For Ministry of Supply.
27 January	Ennerdale	Dale-class oiler	Swan, Hunter & Wigham Richardson Co. Ltd.	Haverton Hill-on-Tees	United Kingdom	For Royal Fleet Auxiliary. Completed as a Gantry Landing Ship.
27 January	Empire Storm	Cargo ship	John Readhead & Sons Ltd.	South Shields	United Kingdom	For Ministry of Supply.
28 January	Maplefield	Cargo ship	Lytham Shipbuilding & Engineering Co. Ltd.	Lytham	United Kingdom	For Zillah Shipping & Carrying Co. Ltd.
28 January	Pakenham	P-class destroyer	Hawthorn Leslie & Co.	Hebburn-on-Tyne	United Kingdom	For Royal Navy
29 January	Blue Ranger	Tanker	Harland & Wolff	Belfast	United Kingdom	For Royal Fleet Auxiliary.
29 January	Lively	L-class destroyer	Cammell Laird & Co Ltd.	Birkenhead	United Kingdom	For Royal Navy
30 January	Croome	Hunt-class destroyer	Alexander Stephen & Sons	Govan	United Kingdom	For Royal Navy
30 January	Empire Larch	Larch-class tug	Goole Shipbuilding & Repairing Co. Ltd.	Goole	United Kingdom	For the Admiralty.
30 January	Empire Lake	Collier	William Gray & Co. Ltd.	West Hartlepool	United Kingdom	For Ministry of War Transport.
7 February	Empire Ridge	Ore carrier	Lithgows Ltd.	Port Glasgow	United Kingdom	For Ministry of War Transport.
10 February	Empire Sky	Cargo ship	J. L. Thompson & Sons Ltd.	Sunderland	United Kingdom	For Ministry of Supply.
11 February	Empire Coral	Norwegian type tanker	Sir J.s Laing & Sons Ltd.	Sunderland	United Kingdom	For Ministry of Supply.
11 February	Empire Oil	Ocean type tanker	Furness Shipbuilding Co. Ltd.	Haverton Hill-on-Tees	United Kingdom	For Ministry of Supply.
11 February	Empire Spray	Cargo ship	William Doxford & Sons Ltd.	Pallion	United Kingdom	For Ministry of Supply.
12 February	Aster	Flower-class corvette	Harland & Wolff	Belfast	United Kingdom	For Royal Navy.
12 February	Penn	P-class destroyer	Vickers-Armstrongs	Newcastle upon Tyne	United Kingdom	For Royal Navy
12 February	Starwort	Flower-class corvette	Harland & Wolff	Govan	United Kingdom	For Royal Navy.
13 February	Empire Shoal	Coaster	Harland and Wolff	Govan	United Kingdom	For Ministry of Supply.
13 February	Michael E	CAM Ship	William Hamilton and Company	Port Glasgow	United Kingdom	For Bury Hill Shipping Co Ltd.
15 February	Ambrose Fleming	Collier	Burntisland Shipbuilding Company	Burntisland	United Kingdom	For London Power Co. Ltd.
15 February	Bergamot	Flower-class corvette	Harland & Wolff	Belfast	United Kingdom	For Royal Navy.
15 February	Laforey	L-class destroyer	Yarrow Shipbuilders	Govan	United Kingdom	For Royal Navy
15 February	Manchester Trader	Cargo ship	Blythswood Shipbuilding Co. Ltd.	Glasgow	United Kingdom	For Manchester Liners Ltd.
17 February	Dewdale	Dale-class oiler	Cammel Laird & Co. Ltd.	Birkenhead	United Kingdom	For Royal Fleet Auxiliary. Completed as a Gantry Landing Ship.
18 February	Empire Isle	Empire Isle-class coaster	Henry Scarr Ltd.	Hessle	United Kingdom	For Ministry of Supply.
24 February	Cromarty	Bangor-class minesweeper	Blyth Dry Docks & Shipbuilding Co. Ltd	Blyth, Northumberland	United Kingdom	For Royal Navy.
25 February	Murdoch	C-type coaster	S. P. Austin & Sons Ltd.	Sunderland	United Kingdom	For Gas, Light & Coke Co. Ltd.
26 February	Empire Bridge	Coaster	W. J. Yarwood & Sons	Northwich	United Kingdom	For Ministry of Supply
1 March	Rio de la Plata	Type C3-class cargo ship	Sun Shipbuilding & Drydock Co.	Chester, Pennsylvania	United States	For United States Maritime Commission
2 March	Empire Zephyr	Cargo ship	C. Connell & Co. Ltd.	Glasgow	United Kingdom	For Ministry of Supply.
4 March	Empire Faith	CAM ship	Barclay Curle	Scotstoun	United Kingdom	For Ministry of Supply
10 March	Chiddingfold	Hunt-class destroyer	Scotts Shipbuilding and Engineering Company	Greenock	United Kingdom	For Royal Navy
11 March	Offa	O-class destroyer	Fairfield Shipbuilding and Engineering Company	Govan	United Kingdom	For Royal Navy
11 March	TLC 25	Tank Landing Craft	Harland & Wolff	Belfast	United Kingdom	For Royal Navy.
11 March	TLC 26	Tank Landing Craft	Harland & Wolff	Belfast	United Kingdom	For Royal Navy.
12 March	Daghestan	CAM ship	William Doxford & Sons Ltd.	Pallion	United Kingdom	For Hindustan Steam Shipping Co. Ltd.
12 March	Exmoor	Hunt-class destroyer	Swan Hunter	Wallsend	United Kingdom	For Royal Navy
12 March	Gloucester	Cargo ship	Alexander Stephen & Sons Ltd.	Linthouse	United Kingdom	For Federal Steam Navigation Co. Ltd.
12 March	Gold Ranger	Ranger-class tanker	Caledon Shipbuilding & Engineering Co. Ltd.	Dundee	United Kingdom	For Royal Fleet Auxiliary.
12 March	Vervain	Flower-class corvette	Harland & Wolff	Belfast	United Kingdom	For Royal Navy.
13 March	Donovania	Tanker	R. & W. Hawthorn, Leslie and Co. Ltd.	Newcastle on Tyne	United Kingdom	For Anglo-Saxon Petroleum Co. Ltd.
13 March	Empire Crag	Coaster	James Pollock & Sons	Faversham	United Kingdom	For Ministry of Supply.
	Empire Foam	Cargo ship	Swan, Hunter & Wigham Richardson Ltd.	Wallsend	United Kingdom	For Ministry of War Transport.
15 March	Empire Foam	CAM ship	James Pollock & Sons	Faversham	United Kingdom	For Ministry of Supply
15 March	Empire Lagoon	Icemaid type collier	Grangemouth Dockyard Co. Ltd.	Grangemouth	United Kingdom	For Ministry of War Transport.
15 March	Empire Oak	Larch-class tug	Goole Shipbuilding & Repairing Co. Ltd.	Goole	United Kingdom	For the Admiralty.
15 March	Empire Ocean	Cargo ship	William Gray & Co. Ltd.	West Hartlepool	United Kingdom	For Ministry of Supply.
17 March	Badsworth	Hunt-class destroyer	Cammell Laird & Co Ltd	Birkenhead	United Kingdom	For Royal Navy
17 March	Empire Ness	Ore carrier	Lithgows Ltd.	Port Glasgow	United Kingdom	For Ministry of Supply.
20 March	Romeo	Shakespearian-class trawler	Harland & Wolff	Belfast	United Kingdom	For Royal Navy.
25 March	Empire Ray	Cargo ship	Greenock Dockyard Co. Ltd.	Greenock	United Kingdom	For Ministry of Supply
27 March	Dingledale	Dale-class oiler	Harland & Wolff	Govan	United Kingdom	For Royal Fleet Auxiliary.
27 March	Empire Cape	Coaster	Scotts Shipbuilding and Engineering Company	Greenock	United Kingdom	For Ministry of Supply
27 March	Empire Day	CAM ship	William Doxford & Sons Ltd.	Pallion	United Kingdom	For Ministry of Supply.
27 March	Empire Hope	Refrigerated cargo liner	Harland & Wolff Ltd.	Belfast	United Kingdom	For Ministry of Supply.
27 March	Petard	P-class destroyer	Vickers-Armstrongs	Walker-on-Tyne	United Kingdom	For Royal Navy
28 March	Empire Wave	Cargo ship	J. L. Thompson & Sons Ltd.	Sunderland	United Kingdom	For Ministry of Supply.
29 March	Empire Flint	Ocean type tanker	Swan, Hunter & Wigham Richardson Ltd.	Wallsend	United Kingdom	For Ministry of Supply.
31 March	Empire Moonbeam	Cargo ship	Hong Kong & Whampoa Dock Co. Ltd.	Hong Kong	Hong Kong	For Ministry of Supply.
31 March	Onslow	O-class destroyer	John Brown & Company	Clydebank	United Kingdom	For Royal Navy
March	Empire Firth	Coaster	Richards Ironworks Ltd.	Lowestoft	United Kingdom	For Ministry of Supply.
March	Pan-Pennsylvania	T3 tanker	Alabama Drydock and Shipbuilding Company	Mobile, Alabama	United States	For National Bulk Carriers.
March	2 unnamed vessels	Tank barges	Alabama Drydock and Shipbuilding Company	Mobile, Alabama	United States	For private owners.
1 April	Dulverton	Hunt-class destroyer	Alexander Stephen & Sons	Govan	United Kingdom	For Royal Navy
4 April	Empire Starlight	Cargo ship	Hong Kong & Whampoa Dock Co. Ltd.	Hong Kong	Hong Kong	For United Kingdom.
9 April	Barbour	Bar-class boom defence vessel	Blyth Dry Docks & Shipbuilding Co. Ltd	Blyth, Northumberland	United Kingdom	For Royal Navy.
10 April	Buttercup	Flower-class corvette	Harland & Wolff	Belfast	United Kingdom	For Royal Navy.
10 April	Cardak	Ferry	Ferguson Brothers Ltd.	Port Glasgow	United Kingdom	For Turkish Government.
10 April	Empire Brook	Coaster	William Gray and Company	West Hartlepool	United Kingdom	For Ministry of Supply
10 April	Empire Mica	Ocean type tanker	Furness Shipbuilding Co. Ltd.	Haverton Hill-on-Tees	United Kingdom	For Ministry of Supply.
10 April	Empire Sun	Cargo ship	Short Brothers Ltd.	Sunderland	United Kingdom	For Ministry of Supply.
10 April	Pathfinder	P-class destroyer	Hawthorn Leslie & Co.	Hebburn-on-Tyne	United Kingdom	For Royal Navy
11 April	Chrysanthemum	Flower-class corvette	Harland & Wolff	Belfast	United Kingdom	For Royal Navy.
12 April	Derwentdale	Dale-class oiler	Harland & Wolff	Govan	United Kingdom	For Royal Fleet Auxiliary. Completed as a Landing Ship, Gantry.
12 April	Empire Bank	Empire Isle-class coaster	Henry Scarr Ltd.	Hessle	United Kingdom	For Ministry of Supply.
12 April	Rio de Janeiro	Type C3-class cargo ship	Sun Shipbuilding & Drydock Co.	Chester, Pennsylvania	United States	For United States Maritime Commission
12 April	Empire Bank	Coaster	Henry Scarr Ltd	Hessle	United Kingdom	For Ministry of Supply
13 April	Mooncrest	Cargo ship	Lithgows Ltd.	Port Glasgow	United Kingdom	For Crest Shipping Co. Ltd.
16 April	Hurworth	Hunt-class destroyer	Vickers-Armstrongs	Wallsend	United Kingdom	For Royal Navy
17 April	Noble	N-class destroyer	William Doxford & Sons	Sunderland	United Kingdom	Transferred to Royal Netherlands Navy before completion, completed as Van Galen.
22 April	Miner VI	Minelayer	Philip & Son Ltd	Dartmouth, Devon	United Kingdom	For Royal Navy.
24 April	Adams Beck	Collier	Burntisland Shipbuilding Company	Burntisland	United Kingdom	For Gas, Light & Coke Co. Ltd.
25 April	Capitol	C-type coaster	S. P. Austin & Sons Ltd.	Sunderland	United Kingdom	For Gas, Light & Coke Co. Ltd.
26 April	Empire Eve	CAM ship	William Pickersgill & Sons Ltd	Sunderland	United Kingdom	For Ministry of Supply
27 April	Empire Heath	Cargo ship	Bartram & Sons Ltd	Sunderland	United Kingdom	For Ministry of Supply.
28 April	Calpe	Hunt-class destroyer	Swan Hunter	Wallsend	United Kingdom	For Royal Navy
28 April	Empire Franklin	Cargo ship	John Readhead and Sons	South Shields	United Kingdom	For Ministry of Supply
28 April	Empire Haven	Cargo ship	Taikoo Dockyard & Engineering Company of Hong Kong Ltd.	Hong Kong	Hong Kong	For Ministry of Supply.
28 April	Empire Lugard	Cargo ship	William Doxford & Sons Ltd.	Pallion	United Kingdom	For Ministry of Supply.
28 April	Empire Moat	Ore carrier	Lithgows Ltd.	Port Glasgow	United Kingdom	For Ministry of Supply.
28 April	Empire Opal	Norwegian type tanker	Sir J. Laing & Sons Ltd.	Sunderland	United Kingdom	For Ministry of Supply.
29 April	Empire Gale	Cargo ship	Vickers-Armstrongs Ltd.	Barrow-in-Furness	United Kingdom	For Ministry of Supply.
30 April	Kafiristan	Cargo ship	William Doxford & Sons Ltd.	Pallion	United Kingdom	For Hindustan Steam Shipping Co. Ltd.
April	Saturn	Sternwheeler	William Denny and Brothers Ltd.	Dumbarton	United Kingdom	For India General Navigation & Railway Co. Ltd.
3 May	Rosalind	Shakespearian-class trawler	Harland & Wolff	Belfast	United Kingdom	For Royal Navy.
9 May	Empire Hudson	Cargo ship	J. L. Thompson & Sons Ltd.	Sunderland	United Kingdom	For Ministry of War Transport.
10 May	Empire Hurst	Collier	William Gray & Co. Ltd.	West Hartlepool	United Kingdom	For Ministry of War Transport.
11 May	Kizugawa Maru	WWII Standard D-class tanker	Kawaminami	Nagasaki	Japan	For Imperial Japanese Navy
12 May	Middleton	Hunt-class destroyer	Vickers-Armstrongs	Wallsend	United Kingdom	For Royal Navy
12 May	Merton	Cargo ship	Burntisland Shipbuilding Company	Burntisland	United Kingdom	For R Chapman & Son.
12 May	Empire Flame	CAM ship	Cammell Laird	Birkenhead	United Kingdom	For Ministry of War Transport
13 May	Empire Darwin	CAM ship	William Gray & Company	West Hartlepool	United Kingdom	For Ministry of War Transport
14 May	Empire Pride	Cargo liner	Barclay, Curle & Co. Ltd.	Glasgow	United Kingdom	For Ministry of War Transport. Completed as a troopship.
20 May	Empire Maple	Maple-type tug	Richard Dunston Ltd.	Thorne	United Kingdom	For Ministry of War Transport.
24 May	Empire Glen	Cargo ship	C. Connell & Co. Ltd.	Glasgow	United Kingdom	For Ministry of War Transport.
26 May	Clan Buchanan	Cargo ship	William Denny and Bros. Ltd.	Dumbarton	United Kingdom	Requisitioned by the Admiralty.
26 May	Empire Dell	CAM ship	Lithgows Ltd	Port Glasgow	United Kingdom	For Ministry of War Transport
27 May	Empire Jet	Ocean type tanker	Blythwood Shipbuilding Co. Ltd.	Glasgow	United Kingdom	For Ministry of War Transport.
27 May	Empire Sapphire	Ocean type tanker	Furness Shipbuilding Co. Ltd.	Haverton Hill-on-Tees	United Kingdom	For Ministry of War Transport.
27 May	Empire Tide	Cargo ship	Lithgows Ltd.	Port Glasgow	United Kingdom	For Ministry of War Transport.
27 May	Gray Ranger	Ranger-class tanker	Caledon Shipbuilding & Engineering Co. Ltd.	Dundee	United Kingdom	For Royal Fleet Auxiliary.
28 May	Cowslip	Flower-class corvette	Harland & Wolff	Belfast	United Kingdom	For Royal Navy.
28 May	Empire Ford	Coaster	J. S. Watson Ltd.	Gainsborough	United Kingdom	For Ministry of War Transport.
28 May	Panther	P-class destroyer	Fairfield Shipbuilding and Engineering Company	Govan	United Kingdom	For Royal Navy
29 May	Grove	Hunt-class destroyer	Swan Hunter	Wallsend	United Kingdom	For Royal Navy
29 May	Southwold	Hunt-class destroyer	J. Samuel White	East Cowes	United Kingdom	For Royal Navy
29 May	Empire Burton	CAM ship	Short Bros. Ltd	Pallion	United Kingdom	For Ministry of War Transport
29 May	Empire Gem	Ocean type tanker	Harland & Wolff	Govan	United Kingdom	For Ministry of War Transport.
29 May	Empire Willow	Maple-type tug	Richard Dunston Ltd.	Thorne	United Kingdom	For Ministry of War Transport.
5 June	Dunbar	Bangor-class minesweeper	Blyth Dry Docks & Shipbuilding Co. Ltd	Blyth, Northumberland	United Kingdom	For Royal Navy.
5 June	Empire Grove	Coaster	Isaac Pimblott & Sons Ltd.	Northwich	United Kingdom	For Ministry of War Transport.
7 June	Betty Hindley	C-type coaster	S. P. Austin & Sons Ltd.	Sunderland	United Kingdom	For Stephenson, Clarke Ltd.
7 June	South Dakota	South Dakota-class battleship	New York Shipbuilding	Camden, New Jersey	United States	For United States Navy
7 June	Wheatland	Hunt-class destroyer	Yarrow Shipbuilders	Govan	United Kingdom	For Royal Navy
9 June	Beaufort	Hunt-class destroyer	Cammell Laird & Co Ltd	Birkenhead	United Kingdom	For Royal Navy
9 June	British Harmony	Tanker	Swan, Hunter & Wigham Richardson Ltd.	Newcastle upon Tyne	United Kingdom	For British Tanker Co. Ltd.
9 June	Empire Ghyll	Icemaid type collier	Grangemouth Dockyard Co. Ltd.	Grangemouth	United Kingdom	For Ministry of War Transport.
9 June	TLC 100	Tank Landing Craft	Harland & Wolff	Belfast	United Kingdom	For Royal Navy.
9 June	TLC 101	Tank Landing Craft	Harland & Wolff	Belfast	United Kingdom	For Royal Navy.
10 June	Empire Lawrence	Cargo ship	J. L. Thompson & Sons Ltd.	Sunderland	United Kingdom	For Ministry of War Transport.
10 June	Empire Pine	Warrior type tug	Scott & Sons Ltd.	Bowling	United Kingdom	For Ministry of War Transport.
10 June	Porcupine	P-class destroyer	Vickers-Armstrongs	Wallsend	United Kingdom	For Royal Navy
11 June	Eglantine	Flower-class corvette	Harland & Wolff	Belfast	United Kingdom	For Royal Navy.
11 June	Empire Bruce	Cargo ship	Sir J Laing & Sons Ltd	Sunderland	United Kingdom	For Ministry of War Transport
11 June	Empire Sedge	Collier	William Gray & Co. Ltd.	West Hartlepool	United Kingdom	For Ministry of War Transport.
11 June	Larchfield	Cargo ship	Lytham Shipbuilding & Engineering Co. Ltd.	Lytham	United Kingdom	For Zillah Shipping & Carrying Co. Ltd.
11 June	Paladin	P-class destroyer	John Brown & Company	Clydebank	United Kingdom	For Royal Navy
12 June	Ahmedabad	Basset-class trawler	Scindia Steam Navigation Co.	Bombay	India	For Royal Indian Navy
12 June	Empire Glade	Cargo ship	Barclay, Curle & Co. Ltd.	Glasgow	United Kingdom	For Ministry of War Transport.
12 June	Empire Raleigh	Cargo ship	William Doxford & Sons Ltd.	Pallion	United Kingdom	For Ministry of War Transport.
14 June	Empire Moonrise	Cargo ship	Hong Kong & Whampoa Dock Co. Ltd.	Hong Kong	United Kingdom	For Ministry of War Transport.
14 June	PT 25	Minesweeper	Norderwerft Köser & Meyer	Hamburg	Germany	For Soviet Navy
17 June	TLC 102	Tank Landing Craft	Harland & Wolff	Belfast	United Kingdom	For Royal Navy.
17 June	TLC 103	Tank Landing Craft	Harland & Wolff	Belfast	United Kingdom	For Royal Navy.
23 June	Helencrest	Cargo ship	Lithgows Ltd.	Port Glasgow	United Kingdom	For Crest Shipping Co. Ltd.
25 June	Nonpareil	N-class destroyer	William Denny and Brothers	Dumbarton	United Kingdom	Transferred to Royal Netherlands Navy before completion, completed as Tjerk Hiddes
25 June	Priam	Cargo ship	Caledon Shipbuilding & Engineering Co. Ltd.	Dundee	United Kingdom	For Blue Funnel Line.
25 June	Primrose Hill	Cargo ship	William Hamilton & Co. Ltd.	Port Glasgow	United Kingdom	For Putney Hill Steamship Co. Ltd.
26 June	Empire Ruby	Coastal tanker	G. Brown & Co (Marine) Ltd.	Greenock	United Kingdom	For Ministry of War Transport.
26 June	Empire Spinney	coaster	A & J Inglis Ltd.	Glasgow	United Kingdom	For Ministry of War Transport.
27 June	Port Victor	Cargo ship	Swan, Hunter & Wigham Richardson Ltd.	Newcastle upon Tyne	United Kingdom	For Port Line Ltd.
28 June	Diplodon	Tanker	R. & W. Hawthorn, Leslie and Co. Ltd.	Newcastle on Tyne	United Kingdom	For Anglo-Saxon Petroleum Co. Ltd.
30 June	Empire Grenfell	Cargo ship	William Doxford & Sons Ltd.	Pallion	United Kingdom	For Ministry of War Transport.
1 July	Denham	Tender	W. J. Yarwood & Sons Ltd.	Northwich	United Kingdom	For Mersey Docks & Harbour Board.
1 July	Empire Morn	Cargo ship	Vickers-Armstrongs Ltd.	Barrow-in-Furness	United Kingdom	For Ministry of War Transport.
8 July	Empire Amethyst	Ocean type tanker	Furness Shipbuilding Co. Ltd.	Haverton Hill-on-Tees	United Kingdom	For Ministry of War Transport.
8 July	Empire Cranmer	Cargo ship	J. L. Thompson & Sons Ltd.	Sunderland	United Kingdom	For Ministry of War Transport
8 July	Empire Cromwell	Cargo ship	William Pickersgill & Sons Ltd	Sunderland	United Kingdom	For Ministry of War Transport
8 July	Norton	Cargo ship	Burntisland Shipbuilding Company	Burntisland	United Kingdom	For R. Chapman & Son.
9 July	Barclose	Bar-class boom defence vessel	Blyth Dry Docks & Shipbuilding Co. Ltd	Blyth, Northumberland	United Kingdom	For Royal Navy.
9 July	Empire Cabot	Cargo ship	William Gray & Company	West Hartlepool	United Kingdom	For Ministry of War Transport
9 July	Empire Mallory	Cargo ship	C. Connell & Co. Ltd.	Glasgow	United Kingdom	For Ministry of War Transport.
10 July	Empire Diamond	Ocean type tanker	Harland & Wolff	Belfast	United Kingdom	For Ministry of War Transport.
10 July	Empire Garnet	Empire Lad-class coastal tanker	Rowhedge Ironworks Ltd	Rowhedge	United Kingdom	For Ministry of War Transport. Completed as Empire Lad.
10 July	Empire Scott	Cargo ship	John Readhead & Sons Ltd.	South Shields	United Kingdom	For Ministry of War Transport.
12 July	Empire Atoll	Refrigerated coaster	Ardrossan Dockyard Ltd	Ardrossan	United Kingdom	For Ministry of War Transport
15 July	Empire Stanley	Cargo ship	Greenock Dockyard Co. Ltd.	Greenock	United Kingdom	For Ministry of War Transport
22 July	Ardrossan	Bangor-class minesweeper	Blyth Dry Docks & Shipbuilding Co. Ltd	Blyth, Northumberland	United Kingdom	For Royal Navy.
22 July	Cowdray	Hunt-class destroyer	Scotts Shipbuilding and Engineering Company	Greenock	United Kingdom	For Royal Navy
22 July	Fritillary	Flower-class corvette	Harland & Wolff	Belfast	United Kingdom	For Royal Navy.
22 July	U-117	Type XB submarine	Friedrich Krupp Germaniawerft	Kiel	Germany	For Kriegsmarine
23 July	Bedale	Hunt-class destroyer	Hawthorn Leslie & Co	Hebburn-on-Tyne	United Kingdom	Transferred to Polish Navy before completion, completed as Ślązak
23 July	Bleasdale	Hunt-class destroyer	Vickers-Armstrongs	Newcastle upon Tyne	United Kingdom	For Royal Navy
23 July	Empire Almond	Cargo ship	Taikoo Dockyard & Engineering Company of Hong Kong Ltd	Hong Kong	Hong Kong	For Ministry of War Transport
23 July	Empire Shackleton	Cargo ship	Lithgows Ltd.	Port Glasgow	United Kingdom	For Ministry of War Transport.
24 July	Empire Livingstone	Cargo ship	Lithgows Ltd.	Port Glasgow	United Kingdom	For Ministry of War Transport.
24 July	Genista	Flower-class corvette	Harland & Wolff	Belfast	United Kingdom	For Royal Navy.
25 July	Hursley	Hunt-class destroyer	Swan Hunter	Wallsend	United Kingdom	Transferred to Royal Hellenic Navy before completion, completed as Kriti
26 July	Empire Wolfe	Scandinavian type cargo ship	William Gray & Co. Ltd.	West Hartlepool	United Kingdom	For Ministry of War Transport.
26 July	San Diego	Atlanta-class cruiser	Fore River Shipyard	Quincy, Massachusetts	United States	For United States Navy
28 July	Empire Clive	Cargo ship	Cammell Laird & Co Ltd	Birkenhead	United Kingdom	For Ministry of War Transport
28 July	Empire Gilbert	Cargo ship	Bartram & Sons Ltd	Sunderland	United Kingdom	For Ministry of War Transport.
28 July	Empire Wyclif	Cargo ship	Short Brothers Ltd.	Sunderland	United Kingdom	For Ministry of War Transport.
29 July	Empire Pearl	Norwegian type tanker	Sir J. Laing & Sons Ltd.	Sunderland	United Kingdom	For Ministry of War Transport.
31 July	Empire Lass	Coastal tanker	Grangemouth Dockyard Co. Ltd.	Grangemouth	United Kingdom	For Ministry of War Transport.
July	William C. McTarnahan	Tanker	Alabama Drydock and Shipbuilding Company	Mobile, Alabama	United States	For National Bulk Carriers.
5 August	Partridge	P-class destroyer	Fairfield Shipbuilding and Engineering Company	Govan	United Kingdom	For Royal Navy
5 August	Lauderdale	Hunt-class destroyer	John I. Thornycroft and Company	Woolston	United Kingdom	For Royal Navy
5 August	Sir Leonard Pearce	Collier	Burntisland Shipbuilding Company	Burntisland	United Kingdom	For London Power Co. Ltd.
8 August	Empire Sound	Coaster	Richards Ironworks Ltd.	Lowestoft	United Kingdom	For Ministry of War Transport.
8 August	Urlana	Cargo ship	Barclay, Curle & Co. Ltd.	Glasgow	United Kingdom	For British India Steam Navigation Company.
9 August	Empire Birch	Near-Warrior type tug	Henry Scarr Ltd.	Hessle	United Kingdom	For Ministry of War Transport.
11 August	Kanbe	Cargo ship	William Denny and Brothers Ltd.	Dumbarton	United Kingdom	For British & Burmese Steam Navigation Co. Ltd.
12 August	Airedale	Hunt-class destroyer	John Brown and Company	Greenock	United Kingdom	For Royal Navy
12 August	Nottingham	Cargo ship	Alexander Stephen & Sons Ltd.	Linthouse	United Kingdom	For Federal Steam Navigation Co. Ltd.
12 August	Tetcott	Hunt-class destroyer	J. Samuel White	East Cowes	United Kingdom	For Royal Navy
13 August	Empire Ash	Near-Warrior type tug	John Crown & Sons Ltd.	Sunderland	United Kingdom	For Ministry of War Transport.
15 August	Empire Latimer	Cargo ship	William Doxford & Sons Ltd.	Pallion	United Kingdom	For Ministry of War Transport.
16 August	Ocean Vanguard	Ocean ship	Permanente Metals Corporation	Richmond, California	United States	For War Shipping Administration.
21 August	Empire Onyx	Ocean type tanker	Harland & Wolff	Govan	United Kingdom	For Ministry of War Transport.
21 August	Empire Ridley	Cargo ship	Lithgows Ltd.	Port Glasgow	United Kingdom	For Ministry of War Transport.
21 August	Green Ranger	Ranger-class tanker	Caledon Shipbuilding & Engineering Co. Ltd.	Dundee	United Kingdom	For Royal Fleet Auxiliary.
21 August	Sound Fisher	C-type coaster	S. P. Austin & Sons Ltd.	Sunderland	United Kingdom	For .
22 August	Derwent	Hunt-class destroyer	Vickers-Armstrongs	Barrow-in-Furness	United Kingdom	For Royal Navy
23 August	Earlston	Cargo ship	Burntisland Shipbuilding Company	Burntisland	United Kingdom	For R. Chapman & Son.
23 August	Empire Liberty	Cargo ship	J. L. Thompson & Sons Ltd.	Sunderland	United Kingdom	For Ministry of War Transport.
23 August	Empire Parsons	Cargo ship	William Gray & Co. Ltd.	West Hartlepool	United Kingdom	For Ministry of War Transport.
25 August	British Character	Tanker	Swan, Hunter & Wigham Richardson Ltd.	Newcastle upon Tyne	United Kingdom	For British Tanker Co. Ltd.
25 August	Empire Grace	Refrigerated cargo liner	Harland & Wolff Ltd.	Belfast	United Kingdom	For Ministry of War Transport.
25 August	Empire Marriott	Cargo ship	William Pickersgill & Co. Ltd.	Southwick	United Kingdom	For Ministry of War Transport.
25 August	Empire Stevenson	Cargo ship	John Readhead & Sons Ltd.	South Shields	United Kingdom	For .
26 August	Empire Emerald	Ocean type tanker	Furness Shipbuilding Co. Ltd.	Haverton Hill-on-Tees	United Kingdom	For Ministry of War Transport.
26 August	Empire Masefield	Cargo ship	Swan, Hunter & Wigham Richardson Ltd.	Wallsend	United Kingdom	For Ministry of War Transport.
27 August	Aldenham	Hunt-class destroyer	Cammell Laird & Co Ltd	Birkenhead	United Kingdom	For Royal Navy
27 August	Empire Selwyn	Cargo ship	William Doxford & Sons Ltd.	Pallion	United Kingdom	For Ministry of War Transport.
28 August	Empire Baffin	Cargo ship	Lithgows Ltd	Port Glasgow	United Kingdom	For Ministry of War Transport
28 August	Empire Boy	Coastal tanker	Goole Shipbuilding & Repairing Co. Ltd.	Goole	United Kingdom	For Ministry of War Transport.
28 August	Oxlip	Flower-class corvette	Harland & Wolff	Govan	United Kingdom	For Royal Navy.
31 August	Ocean Venture	Ocean ship	Permanente Metals Corporation	Richmond, California	United States	For War Shipping Administration.
August	Silivri	Ferry	Ferguson Brothers Ltd.	Port Glasgow	United Kingdom	For Turkish Government.
2 September	Fredericton	Flower-class corvette	Marine Industries Ltd.	Sorel	Canada	For Royal Canadian Navy
3 September	Barcock	Bar-class boom defence vessel	Blyth Dry Docks & Shipbuilding Co. Ltd	Blyth, Northumberland	United Kingdom	For Royal Navy.
4 September	Empire Sidney	Cargo ship	Harland & Wolff	Belfast	United Kingdom	For Ministry of War Transport.
4 September	Matchless	M-class destroyer	Alexander Stephen and Sons	Linthouse	United Kingdom	For Royal Navy
5 September	Bicester	Hunt-class destroyer	Hawthorn Leslie & Co	Hebburn-on-Tyne	United Kingdom	For Royal Navy
6 September	Atlanta	Atlanta-class cruiser	Federal Shipbuilding and Drydock Company	South Kearny, New Jersey	United States	For United States Navy
6 September	Empire Newcomen	Scandinavian type cargo ship	William Gray & Co. Ltd.	West Hartlepool	United Kingdom	For Ministry of War Transport.
6 September	San Juan	Atlanta-class cruiser	Fore River Shipyard	Quincy, Massachusetts	United States	For United States Navy
8 September	Empire River	Coaster	J. S. Watson Ltd.	Gainsborough	United Kingdom	For Ministry of War Transport.
9 September	Darica	Ferry	Ferguson Brothers Ltd.	Port Glasgow	United Kingdom	For Turkish Government.
9 September	Empire Deep	Coaster	Harland & Wolff	Govan	United Kingdom	For Ministry of War Transport.
10 September	Empire Druid	Norwegian type tanker	Sir J. Laing & Sons Ltd.	Sunderland	United Kingdom	For Ministry of War Transport.
11 September	Empire Pict	Ocean type tanker	Blythwood Shipbuilding Co. Ltd.	Glasgow	United Kingdom	For Ministry of War Transport.
19 September	Empire Rhodes	Cargo ship	Caledon Shipbuilding & Engineering Co. Ltd.	Dundee	United Kingdom	For Ministry of War Transport.
22 September	Empire Cadet	Coastal tanker	Grangemouth Dockyard Co. Ltd.	Grangemouth	United Kingdom	For Ministry of War Transport.
22 September	MMS 54	MMS-class minesweeper	Herd & Mackenzie	Buckie	United Kingdom	For Royal Navy.
23 September	Empire Cowper	Cargo ship	William Doxford & Sons	Sunderland	United Kingdom	For Ministry of War Transport
23 September	Empire Field	Cargo ship	William Doxford & Sons	Sunderland	United Kingdom	For Ministry of War Transport
23 September	Massachusetts	South Dakota-class battleship	Fore River Shipyard	Quincy	United States	For United States Navy
24 September	Empire Beacon	Coaster	Scott & Sons Ltd	Bowling	United Kingdom	For Ministry of War Transport
24 September	Empire Bracken	Near-Warrior type tug	Goole Shipbuilding & Repairing Co. Ltd.	Goole	United Kingdom	For Ministry of War Transport.
24 September	Empire Linden	Near-Warrior type tug	Henry Scarr Ltd.	Hessle	United Kingdom	For Ministry of War Transport.
26 September	Empire Cedar	Maple-type tug	Richard Dunston Ltd.	Thorne	United Kingdom	For Ministry of War Transport.
26 September	Empire Halley	Cargo ship	J. L. Thompson & Sons Ltd.	Sunderland	United Kingdom	For Ministry of War Transport.
27 September	Adabelle Lykes	C1-A Cargo ship, converted to WSA troop transport 1944	Pusey and Jones	Wilmington, Delaware	United States	
27 September	African Planet	Cargo ship	Ingalls Shipbuilding	Pascagoula, Mississippi	United States	Transferred to United States Navy before completion, completed as George Clymer.
27 September	Alcoa Polaris	Cargo ship	Consolidated Steel Corporation	Wilmington, California	United States	
27 September	Empire Stanley	Cargo ship	Greenock Dockyard Co. Ltd.	Greenock	United Kingdom	For Ministry of War Transport
27 September	Fredrick Funston	Frederick Funston-class attack transport	Seattle-Tacoma Shipbuilding Corporation	Tacoma, Washington	United States	For United States Navy
27 September	James McKay	Cargo ship	Bethlehem Sparrows Point Shipyard	Sparrows Point, Maryland	United States	
27 September	John C. Fremont	Liberty ship	California Shipbuilding Corporation	Los Angeles, California	United States	For War Shipping Administration.
27 September	Ledbury	Hunt-class destroyer	John I. Thornycroft and Company	Woolston	United Kingdom	For Royal Navy
27 September	Louise Lykes	Type C2-F cargo ship	Federal Shipbuilding and Drydock Company	South Kearny, New Jersey	United States	For Lykes Brothers Steamship Company
27 September	Ocean Vigil	Ocean ship	Permanente Metals Corporation	Richmond, California	United States	For War Shipping Administration.
27 September	Ocean Voice	Ocean ship	Permanente Metals Corporation	Richmond, California	United States	For War Shipping Administration.
27 September	Patrick Henry	Liberty ship	Bethlehem Fairfield Shipyard	Baltimore, Maryland	United States	For War Shipping Administration.
27 September	Star of Oregon	Cargo ship	Oregon Shipbuilding Corporation	Portland, Oregon	United States	For War Shipping Administration.
27 September	Sinclair Superflame	Cargo ship	Fore River Shipyard	Quincy, Massachusetts	United States	
27 September	Steel Artisan	Type C3-class cargo ship	Western Pipe and Steel Company	San Francisco, California	United States	Transferred to United States Navy before completion, completed as Barnes.
27 September	Surprise	Cargo ship	Sun Shipbuilding & Drydock Co.	Chester, Pennsylvania	United States	
27 September	Cowie	Gleaves-class destroyer	Boston Naval Yard	Boston, Massachusetts	United States	For United States Navy
27 September	Knight	Gleaves-class destroyer	Boston Naval Yard	Boston, Massachusetts	United States	For United States Navy
2 October	VIC 1	VIC lighter	Richard Dunston Ltd.	Thorne	United Kingdom	For the Admiralty.
4 October	Allerton	Cargo ship	Burntisland Shipbuilding Company	Burntisland	United Kingdom	For R. Chapman & Son.
4 October}	Empire Jack	Coaster	Vickers Armstrongs Ltd.	Barrow-in-Furness	United Kingdom	For Ministry of War Transport.
6 October	Empire Byron	Cargo ship	Bartram & Sons	Sunderland	United Kingdom	For Ministry of War Transport
6 October	Empire Marlowe	Cargo ship	William Gray & Co. Ltd.	West Hartlepool	United Kingdom	For Ministry of War Transport.
6 October	Quality	Q-class destroyer	Swan Hunter	Wallsend	United Kingdom	For Royal Navy
7 October	Empire Celt	Ocean type tanker	Furness Shipbuilding Co. Ltd.	Haverton Hill-on-Tees	United Kingdom	For Ministry of War Transport.
7 October	Empire Rennie	Cargo ship	C. Connell & Co. Ltd.	Glasgow	United Kingdom	For Ministry of War Transport.
7 October	MSC Neptune	Tug	Henry Robb Ltd.	Leith	United Kingdom	For Manchester Ship Canal Company.
8 October	Empire Baxter	Cargo ship	Vickers-Armstrongs Ltd.	Barrow-in-Furness	United Kingdom	For Ministry of War Transport
8 October	Loyal	L-class destroyer	Scotts Shipbuilding and Engineering Company	Greenock	United Kingdom	For Royal Navy
8 October	San Venancio	Tanker	R. & W. Hawthorn, Leslie and Co. Ltd.	Newcastle on Tyne	United Kingdom	For Eagle Oil & Shipping Co. Ltd.
9 October	Empire Fir	Warrior type tug	Scott & Sons Ltd.	Bowling	United Kingdom	For Ministry of War Transport.
January	Hororata	Refrigerated cargo ship	J. & G. Thompson Ltd.	Clydebank	United Kingdom	For New Zealand Shipping Co. Ltd.
9 October	Onslaught	O-class destroyer	Fairfield Shipbuilding and Engineering Company	Govan	United Kingdom	For Royal Navy
11 October	Albrighton	Hunt-class destroyer	John Brown and Company	Greenock	United Kingdom	For Royal Navy
15 October	Fort St. James	Fort ship	Burrard Dry Dock Co. Ltd.	North Vancouver, British Columbia	Canada	For Ministry of War Transport.
17 October	Umaria	Cargo ship	Barclay, Curle & Co. Ltd.	Glasgow	United Kingdom	For British India Steam Navigation Company.
17 October	Wilton	Hunt-class destroyer	Yarrow Shipbuilders	Gocan	United Kingdom	For Royal Navy
19 October	Merriwether Lewis	Liberty ship	Oregon Shipbuilding Corporation	Portland, Oregon	United States	For War Shipping Administration.
20 October	Empire Carey	Scandinavian type Cargo ship	William Gray & Co. Ltd.	West Hartlepool	United Kingdom	For Ministry of War Transport.
20 October	Empire Johnson	Cargo ship	J. L. Thompson & Sons Ltd.	Sunderland	United Kingdom	For Ministry of War Transport.
21 October	Barcross	Bar-class boom defence vessel	Blyth Dry Docks & Shipbuilding Co. Ltd	Blyth, Northumberland	United Kingdom	For Royal Navy.
21 October	Brixham	Bangor-class minesweeper	Blyth Dry Docks & Shipbuilding Co. Ltd	Blyth, Northumberland	United Kingdom	For Royal Navy.
21 October	Empire Heywood	Cargo ship	Caledon Shipbuilding & Engineering Co. Ltd.	Dundee	United Kingdom	For Ministry of War Transport.
21 October	Empire Newton	Cargo ship	Short Brothers Ltd.	Sunderland	United Kingdom	For Ministry of War Transport.
21 October	Nurani	Cargo ship	Lithgows Ltd.	Port Glasgow	United Kingdom	For Asiatic Steam Navigation Co. Ltd.
21 October	Stangarth	Cargo ship	William Pickersgill & Co. Ltd.	Southwick	United Kingdom	For Stanhope Steamship Co. Ltd.
21 October	Steel Architect	Type C3-class cargo ship	Seattle-Tacoma Shipbuilding Corporation	Tacoma, Washington	United States	Transferred to United States Navy before completion, completed as Copahee
21 October	Empire Ballantyne	Cargo ship	Harland and Wolff	Govan	United Kingdom	For Ministry of War Transport
21 October	Empire Norseman	Dale-class oiler	Harland & Wolff	Belfast	United Kingdom	For Ministry of War Transport. Completed as RFA Dinsdale for Royal Fleet Auxiliary.
21 October	Empire Thistle	Near-Warrior type tug	Clelands (Successors) Ltd.	Willington Quay	United Kingdom	For Ministry of War Transport.
22 October	Empire Dryden	Cargo ship	William Doxford & Sons	Sunderland	United Kingdom	For Ministry of War Transport
22 October	Empire Howard	Cargo ship	Lithgows Ltd.	Port Glasgow	United Kingdom	For Ministry of War Transport.
22 October	Empire Ivy	Near-Warrior type tug	Goole Shipbuilding & Repairing Co. Ltd.	Goole	United Kingdom	For Ministry of War Transport.
23 October	Empire Bairn	Coastal tanker	Blythswood Shipbuilders	Glasgow	United Kingdom	For Ministry of War Transport
23 October	Empire Drayton	Cargo ship	Swan, Hunter & Wigham Richardson Ltd	Wallsend	United Kingdom	For Ministry of War Transport
23 October	Ocean Viking	Ocean ship	Permanente Metals Corporation	Richmond, California	United States	For War Shipping Administration.
23 October	VIC 2	VIC lighter	Richard Dunston Ltd.	Thorne	United Kingdom	For the Admiralty.
25 October	Juneau	Atlanta-class cruiser	Federal Shipbuilding and Drydock Company	South Kearny, New Jersey	United States	For United States Navy
26 October	Thomas Paine	Liberty ship	California Shipbuilding Corporation	Los Angeles, California	United States	For War Shipping Administration.
26 October	William Clark	Liberty ship	Oregon Shipbuilding Corporation	Portland, Oregon	United States	For War Shipping Administration.
28 October	Pennywort	Flower-class corvette	Harland & Wolff	Govan	United Kingdom	For Royal Navy.
1 November	Cleveland	Cleveland-class cruiser	New York Shipbuilding Corporation	Camden, New Jersey	United States	For United States Navy
3 November	Meteor	M-class destroyer	Alexander Stephen and Sons	Linthouse	United Kingdom	For Royal Navy
4 November	Empire Squire	Cargo ship	John Readhead & Sons Ltd.	South Shields	United Kingdom	For Ministry of War Transport.
4 November	Lambtonian	C-type coaster	S. P. Austin & Sons Ltd.	Sunderland	United Kingdom	For Tanfield Steamship Co. Ltd.
5 November	Bolebroke	Hunt-class destroyer	Swan Hunter	Wallsend	United Kingdom	For Royal Navy
5 November	Quentin	Q-class destroyer	J. Samuel White	East Cowes	United Kingdom	For Royal Navy
5 November	VIC 5	VIC lighter	Goole Shipbuilding & Repairing Co. Ltd.	Goole	United Kingdom	For the Admiralty.
8 November	Derince	Ferry	Ferguson Brothers Ltd.	Port Glasgow	United Kingdom	For Turkish Government.
9 November	Empire Plane	Maple-type tug	Richard Dunston Ltd.	Thorne	United Kingdom	For Ministry of War Transport.
15 November	Francis Scott Key	Liberty ship	Bethlehem Fairfield Shipyard	Baltimore, Maryland	United States	For War Shipping Administration.
16 November	Benjamin Franklin	Liberty ship	California Shipbuilding Corporation	Los Angeles, California	United States	For War Shipping Administration.
16 November	Ocean Vestal	Ocean ship	Permanente Metals Corporation	Richmond, California	United States	For War Shipping Administration.
16 November	Robert Gray	Liberty ship	Oregon Shipbuilding Corporation	Portland, Oregon	United States	For War Shipping Administration.
18 November	Belvoir	Hunt-class destroyer	Cammell Laird & Co Ltd	Birkenhead	United Kingdom	For Royal Navy
18 November	Empire Airman	tanker	Sir J. Laing & Sons Ltd	Sunderland	United Kingdom	For Ministry of War Transport.
18 November	Empire Metal	Tanker	Furness Shipbuilding Company	Haverton Hill	United Kingdom	For Ministry of War Transport
18 November	Fulham VI	Collier	Burntisland Shipbuilding Company	Burntisland	United Kingdom	For Fulham Borough Council.
19 November	Empire Builder	Cargo ship	William Gray & Company	West Hartlepool	United Kingdom	For Ministry of War Transport
19 November	Empire Cameron	Cargo ship	William Denny and Bros. Ltd.	Dumbarton	United Kingdom	For Ministry of War Transport.
19 November	Empire Drum	Cargo ship	William Doxford & Sons	Sunderland	United Kingdom	For Ministry of War Transport
19 November	Empire Dunstan	Scandinavian type cargo ship	Grangemouth Dockyard Company	Grangemouth	United Kingdom	For Ministry of War Transport.
20 November	Empire Pilgrim	Scandinavian type cargo ship	William Gray & Co. Ltd.	West Hartlepool	United Kingdom	For Ministry of War Transport.
20 November	HMS Unicorn	Aircraft maintenance carrier	Harland & Wolff	Belfast	United Kingdom	For Royal Navy.
21 November	Empire Race	Near-Warrior type tug	Henry Scarr Ltd.	Hessle	United Kingdom	For Ministry of War Transport.
21 November	Indiana	South Dakota-class battleship	Newport News Shipbuilding	Newport News, Virginia	United States	For United States Navy
22 November	Empire Harp	Coastal tanker	Goole Shipbuilding & Repairing Co. Ltd.	Goole	United Kingdom	For Ministry of War Transport
22 November	Aaron Ward	Gleaves-class destroyer	Federal Shipbuilding and Drydock Company	South Kearny, New Jersey	United States	For United States Navy
23 November	John Barry	Liberty ship	Oregon Shipbuilding Corporation	Portland, Oregon	United States	For War Shipping Administration.
29 November	Quilliam	Q-class destroyer	Hawthorn Leslie & Co. Ltd.	Hebburn-on-Tyne	United Kingdom	For Royal Navy
30 November	Ocean Vesper	Ocean ship	Permanente Metals Corporation	Richmond, California	United States	For War Shipping Administration.
2 December	Blackmore	Hunt-class destroyer	Alexander Stephen & Sons	Govan	United Kingdom	For Royal Navy
2 December	Empire Prairie	Cargo ship	Lithgows Ltd.	Port Glasgow	United Kingdom	For Ministry of War Transport.
2 December	Empire Saxon	Ocean type tanker	Swan, Hunter & Wigham Richardson Ltd.	Wallsend	United Kingdom	For Ministry of War Transport.
2 December	Musketeer	M-class destroyer	Fairfield Shipbuilding and Engineering Company	Govan	United Kingdom	For Royal Navy
3 December	Derryheen	Cargo ship	Burntisland Shipbuilding Company	Burntisland	United Kingdom	For McCowan & Cross Ltd.
3 December	Empire Ranger	Cargo ship	Lithgows Ltd.	Port Glasgow	United Kingdom	For Ministry of War Transport.
3 December	John Paul Jones	Liberty ship	California Shipbuilding Corporation	Los Angeles, California	United States	For War Shipping Administration.
4 December	Bustler	Bustler-class tug	Henry Robb Ltd.	Leith	United Kingdom	For the Admiralty.
4 December	Norseman	N-class destroyer	John I. Thornycroft & Company	Woolston	United Kingdom	Transferred to Royal Australian Navy before completion. Completed as Nepal
6 December	Empire Dragon	Cargo ship	Hong Kong and Whampoa Dock	Hong Kong	Hong Kong	For Ministry of War Transport
6 December	Richard Henry Lee	Liberty ship	Bethlehem Fairfield Shipyard	Baltimore, Maryland	United States	For War Shipping Administration.
6 December	Roger B. Taney	Liberty ship	Bethlehem Fairfield Shipyard	Baltimore, Maryland	United States	For War Shipping Administration.
6 December	Zebulon B. Vance	Liberty ship	North Carolina Shipbuilding Company	Wilmington, North Carolina	United States	For War Shipping Administration.
7 December	Thomas Jefferson	Liberty ship	Oregon Shipbuilding Corporation	Portland, Oregon	United States	For War Shipping Administration.
9 December	Ocean Valley	Ocean ship	Permanente Metals Corporation	Richmond, California	United States	For War Shipping Administration.
10 December	Doran	Gleaves-class destroyer	Boston Naval Yard	Boston, Massachusetts	United States	For United States Navy
11 December	U-607	Type VIIC submarine	Blohm & Voss	Hamburg	Germany	For Kriegsmarine
14 December	John Hancock	Liberty ship	Oregon Shipbuilding Corporation	Portland, Oregon	United States	For War Shipping Administration.
15 December	Fulham VII	Collier	Burntisland Shipbuilding Company	Burntisland	United Kingdom	For Fulham Borough Council.
16 December	Empire Nomad	Cargo ship	J. L. Thompson & Sons Ltd.	Sunderland	United Kingdom	For Ministry of War Transport.
17 December	Columbia	Cleveland-class cruiser	New York Shipbuilding Corporation	Camden, New Jersey	United States	For United States Navy
17 December	Empire Ballad	Cargo ship	Bartram & Sons	Sunderland	United Kingdom	For Ministry of War Transport
17 December	MSC Nymph	Tug	Henry Robb Ltd.	Leith	United Kingdom	For Manchester Ship Canal Company.
17 December	Tarantia	Cargo ship	William Doxford & Sons Ltd.	Pallion	United Kingdom	For Anchor Line Ltd.
18 December	Easdale	Dale-class oiler	Furness Shipbuilding Co. Ltd.	Haverton Hill-on-Tees	United Kingdom	For Royal Fleet Auxiliary.
18 December	Empire Splendour	Cargo ship	Harland & Wolff	Belfast	United Kingdom	For Ministry of War Transport.
18 December	Hatherleigh	Hunt-class destroyer	Vickers-Armstrongs	Newcastle upon Tyne	United Kingdom	Transferred to Royal Hellenic Navy before completion, completed as Kanaris
18 December	Ocean Vision	Ocean ship	Permanente Metals Corporation	Richmond, California	United States	For War Shipping Administration.
18 December	Sir Galahad	Minesweeper	Hall, Russell & Company	Aberdeen	United Kingdom	For Royal Navy
18 December	Stanbank	Cargo ship	William Pickersgill & Co. Ltd.	Southwick	United Kingdom	For Stanhope Steamship Co. Ltd.
19 December	Empire Story	Cargo ship	Short Brothers Ltd.	Sunderland	United Kingdom	For Ministry of War Transport.
19 December	Kong Haakon VII	Cargo ship	Barclay, Curle & Co. Ltd.	Glasgow	United Kingdom	For Norwegian Government.
20 December	Empire Maiden	Coastal tanker	A. & J. Inglis Ltd.	Glasgow	United Kingdom	For Ministry of War Transport.
20 December	Ocean Freedom	Ocean ship	New England Shipbuilding Corporation	South Portland, Maine	United States	For War Shipping Administration.
20 December	Ocean Liberty	Ocean ship	New England Shipbuilding Corporation	South Portland, Maine	United States	For War Shipping Administration.
20 December	St. George	Tug	Ferguson Brothers Ltd.	Port Glasgow	United Kingdom	For Government of Trinidad.
21 December	Empire Courage	Cargo ship	Barclay, Curle & Co. Ltd.	Glasgow	United Kingdom	For Ministry of War Transport.
21 December	Empire Teak	Near-Warrior type tug	Henry Scarr Ltd.	Hessle	United Kingdom	For Ministry of War Transport.
21 December	Paul Revere	Liberty ship	California Shipbuilding Corporation	Los Angeles, California	United States	For War Shipping Administration.
21 December	Philip Livingston	Liberty ship	Oregon Shipbuilding Corporation	Portland, Oregon	United States	For War Shipping Administration.
22 December	Algerine	Algerine-class minesweeper	Harland & Wolff	Belfast	United Kingdom	For Royal Navy.
26 December	VIC 3	VIC lighter	Richard Dunston Ltd.	Thorne	United Kingdom	For the Admiralty.
27 December	Empire Homer	Cargo ship	Greenock Dockyard Co. Ltd.	Greenock	United Kingdom	For Ministry of War Transport
28 December	Alexander Hamilton	Liberty ship	Oregon Shipbuilding Corporation	Portland, Oregon	United States	For War Shipping Administration.
29 December	Empire Zeal	Cargo ship	Lithgows Ltd.	Port Glasgow	United Kingdom	For Ministry of War Transport.
30 December	Empire Addison	Cargo ship	Lithgows	Glasgow	United Kingdom	For Ministry of War Transport.
30 December	Empire Bard	Heavy lift ship	Caledon Shipbuilding & Engineering Company	Dundee	United Kingdom	For Ministry of War Transport
30 December	John Randolph	Liberty ship	Bethlehem Fairfield Shipyard	Baltimore, Maryland	United States	For War Shipping Administration.
30 December	Milne	M-class destroyer	Scotts Shipbuilding & Engineering Company	Greenock	United Kingdom	For Royal Navy
30 December	Magpie	Black Swan-class sloop	John I. Thornycroft & Company	Woolston	United Kingdom	For Royal Navy
31 December	Corfoss	Collier	Burntisland Shipbuilding Company	Burntisland	United Kingdom	For Wm. Cory & Son.
31 December	James Otis	Liberty ship	Permanente Metals Corporation	Richmond, California	United States	For War Shipping Administration.
December	Lady Walmer	Concrete ship	W. & C. French Ltd.	Newport	United Kingdom	For Ministry of War Transport.
Unknown date	Atlas	Cargo ship	Nordseewerke.	Emden	Germany	Completed as Empire Glencoe for Ministry of Transport.
Unknown date	Bishops Retriever	Lighter	W. J. Yarwood & Sons Ltd.	Northwich	United Kingdom	For Liverpool Lighterage Co. Ltd. and/or Bishops Wharf Carrying Co. Ltd.
Unknown date	Boer	Clyde puffer	J. Hay & Sons Ltd.	Kirkintillock	United Kingdom	For private owner.
Unknown date	Bussard	Bussard-class seaplane tender		Königsberg	Germany	For Luftwaffe
Unknown date	D. & E. No. 12	Crane barge	Alabama Drydock and Shipbuilding Company	Mobile, Alabama	United States	For Doullot & Ewin.
Unknown date	Empire Kyle	Coaster	Isaac Pimblott & Sons Ltd.	Northwich	United Kingdom	For Ministry of War Transport.
Unknown date	HDML 1083	Harbour Defence Motor Launch	M. W. Blackmore & Sons Ltd.	Bideford	United Kingdom	For Royal Navy.
Unknown date	Immelmann	Karl Meyer-class seaplane tender	Norderwerft Koser und Meyer	Hamburg	Germany	For Luftwaffe
Unknown date	JAP No. 4000	Tanker			Japan	For private owner.
Unknown date	Le Royal	Trawler	Cochrane & Sons Ltd	Selby	United Kingdom	For Milford Steam Trawling Co. Ltd.
Unknown date	MASB 27	Torpedo boat	British Power Boat Company	Hythe	United Kingdom	For Royal Navy.
Unknown date	MMS 46	MMS-class minesweeper	J. Bolson & Son Ltd.	Poole	United Kingdom	For Royal Navy.
Unknown date	MTB 345	Motor torpedo boat	John I. Thornycroft & Company	Woolston	United Kingdom	Experimental vessel for Royal Navy
Unknown date	Swine	Coaster tanker			Germany	For Kriegsmarine
Unknown date	Nimble	Nimble-class tug	Cochrane & Sons Ltd.	Selby	United Kingdom	For the Admiralty.
Unknown date	Tudor Queen	Tudor Queen type coaster	Burntisland Shipbuilding Co. Ltd.	Burntisland	United Kingdom	For Queenship Navigation Ltd.
Unknown date	U. S. Gypsum No. 5	Deck barge	Alabama Drydock and Shipbuilding Company	Mobile, Alabama	United States	For United States Gypsum.
