= Convoy ON 113 =

Convoy ON.113
- Part of World War II
Date	17–31 July 1942
Location	North Sea

Belligerents
(Nazi Germany) Germany	Canada; United Kingdom

Commanders and leaders
Admiral Karl Dönitz	

Strength
11 U-boats of Wolf pack Wolf	37 merchant ships 11 Escorts

Casualties and losses
	5 ships Sunk; 1 Damaged

Convoy ON 113 was a trade convoy of merchant ships during the second World War. It was the 113th of the numbered series of ON convoys Outbound from the British Isles to North America. The ships departed Liverpool on 17 July 1942 and were joined on 18 July by Mid-Ocean Escort Force Group C-2. They were found on 24 July by the eleven U-boats of Wolf pack Wolf. Five ships were sunk before the convoy reached Halifax, Nova Scotia on 31 July.

== Ships in the convoy ==
These ships were members of Convoy ON 113.

Name	Flag	Tonnage (GRT)	Notes
Abraham Lincoln (1929)	Norway	5,740	New York City
Amastra (1935)	United Kingdom	8,031	New York City
HMCS Annapolis	Royal Canadian Navy		Escort 26 Jul – 31 Jul
Antilochus (1906)	United Kingdom	9,082	New York City
Bayano (1917)	United Kingdom	6,815	96 passengers
HMCS Brandon	Royal Canadian Navy		Escort 18 Jul – 26 Jul
British Engineer (1922)	United Kingdom	6,993	New York City
British Harmony (1941)	United Kingdom	8,453	New York City
British Merit (1942)	United Kingdom	8,093	Maiden voyage in ballast. Damaged by U-552 on 25 Jul. 1 dead. Towed to St John's, Newfoundland
Broompark (1939)	United Kingdom	5,136	Torpedoed by U-552 on 25 Jul sank 1 Aug
HMS Burnham	Royal Navy		Escort 18 Jul – 26 Jul
HMCS Calgary	Royal Canadian Navy		Escort 26 Jul – 31 Jul
HMS Cavina (1924)	United Kingdom	6,907	140 passengers Banana-boat requisitioned from Fyffes by the Admiralty
HMCS Chicoutimi	Royal Canadian Navy		Escort 26 Jul – 31 Jul
HMCS Columbia	Royal Canadian Navy		Escort 26 Jul – 31 Jul
Daldorch (1930)	United Kingdom	5,571	12 passengers, New York City
HMCS Dauphin	Royal Canadian Navy		Escort 18 Jul – 26 Jul
HMCS Drumheller	Royal Canadian Navy		Escort 18 Jul – 26 Jul
Empire Faith (1941)	United Kingdom	7,061	CAM ship. New York City
Empire Flint	United Kingdom	8,129	Oil tanker. 9 passengers. New York City for Curaçao
Empire Foam (1941)	United Kingdom	7,047	Sydney
Empire Rainbow (1941)	United Kingdom	6,942	CAM ship. Sunk by U-607 and U-704. No dead
Empire Rowan (1922)	United Kingdom	9,545	CAM ship. New York City
Empire Tarpon (1920)	United Kingdom	6,085	New York City
Empire Unity (1927)	United Kingdom	6,386	Liverpool to Loch Ewe
Evita (1927)	Norway	6,346	New York City
Explorer (1935)	United Kingdom	6,235	New York City
Harpefjell (1939)	Norway	1,333	Sydney
Inverilen (1938)	United Kingdom	9,456	New York City
J L M Curry (1942)	United States	7,176	New York City
Malayan Prince (1926)	United Kingdom	8,953	4 passengers, New York City
Mount Evans (1919)	Panama	5,598	New York City
Norsol (1941)	Norway	8,236	New York City
Pacific Pioneer (1928)	United Kingdom	6,734	Sunk by U-132 on 30 Jul
Pan Aruba (1931)	Norway	9,231	New York City
Pan-Maine (1936)	United States	7,237	New York City
HMS Polyanthus	Royal Navy		Escort 18 Jul – 26 Jul
Richmond Hill (1940)	United Kingdom	7,579	New York City
Salamis (1939)	Norway	8,286	New York City
Senga (1913)	Yugoslavia	5,140	New York City
Solsten (1929)	Norway	5,379	New York City
St Clair (1937)	United Kingdom	1,637	
HMCS St. Croix	Royal Canadian Navy		Escort 18 Jul – 26 Jul
Stancleeve (1942)	United Kingdom	5,970	Halifax
Thorhild (1935)	Norway	10,316	New York City
Vav (1931)	Norway	6,415	New York City
HMS Walker	Royal Navy		Escort 26 Jul – 31 Jul
Zaanland (1921)	Netherlands	6,813	Oban

== Bibliography ==
- Hague, Arnold (2000). The Allied Convoy System 1939–1945. ISBN 1-86176-147-3.
- Rohwer, J.; Hummelchen, G. (1992). Chronology of the War at Sea 1939–1945. Naval Institute Press. ISBN 1-55750-105-X.
