= Jessmore =

A number of ships have been named Jessmore, including:

- SS Jessmore, torpedoed and sunk in 1917
- MV Jessmore, in service 1946–58
