= Isabel Erica =

Isabel Erica was the name of two ships operated by Moller & Co, Hong Kong:

- SS Isabel Erica, managed from 1958, scrapped in 1969
- MV Isabel Erica, built in 1970, sold 1975
