= SS Empire Darwin =

British ship built in 1941

- Empire Darwin, as she appeared from 1941 to 1943.

History
- Name: Empire Darwin (1941–46); Culrain (1946–59); Mersinidi (1959–67)
- Owner: Ministry of War Transport (1941–45); South Georgia Co Ltd (1945–59); North Europe & Persian Gulf Transport Corporation (1959–66)
- Operator: Evan T Radcliffe & Co Ltd (1941–43); Christian Salvesen & Co Ltd (1943–59); J Livanos & Sons Ltd (1959–66)
- Port of registry: (United Kingdom) West Hartlepool, UK (1941–45); (United Kingdom) Leith, UK (1945–59); Monrovia, Liberia (1959–66)
- Builder: William Gray & Co. Ltd.
- Launched: 13 May 1941
- Completed: July 1941
- Out of service: 1966
- Identification: United Kingdom Official Number 168927 (1941–59); Code Letters BCMQ (1941–59)
- Fate: Scrapped

General characteristics
- Class & type: CAM ship (1941–43); Cargo ship (1943–67)
- Tonnage: 6,710 GRT; 4,870 NRT
- Length: 419 ft 2 in (127.76 m)
- Beam: 56 ft 7 in (17.25 m)
- Draught: 26 ft 7 in (8.10 m)
- Depth: 33 ft 9 in (10.29 m)
- Propulsion: Triple expansion steam engine
- Armament: 1 x Hawker Sea Hurricane (1941–43)

Empire Darwin was a British 6,765 GRT CAM ship built in 1941 by William Gray & Co. Ltd., West Hartlepool, United Kingdom for the Ministry of War Transport (MoWT). Her Hawker Sea Hurricane was involved in the last action by an aircraft flown off a CAM ship, shooting down a Focke-Wulf Fw 200 Condor on 28 July 1943.

She was sold into merchant service in 1945 and renamed Culrain in 1946. In 1953, she was in collision with a Spanish ship in the Strait of Gibraltar, sinking her. In 1959, she was sold to Lebanon and renamed Mersinidi, operating under the Liberian flag. She served until 1966, and was scrapped in 1967.

== Description ==
The ship was built in 1925 by William Gray & Co Ltd, West Hartlepool.

The ship was 419 feet 2 inches (127.76 m) long, with a beam of 56 feet 7 inches (17.25 m). She had a depth of 33 feet 9 inches (10.29 m) and a draught of 26 feet 7 inches (8.10 m). She was assessed at 6,710 GRT, 4,870 NRT.

The ship was propelled by a triple expansion steam engine, which had cylinders of 22 1/2 inches (57 cm), 36 inches (91 cm) and 65 inches (170 cm) diameter by 48 inches (120 cm) stroke. The engine was built by Central Marine Engine Works Ltd, West Hartlepool.

== History ==
=== World War II ===
Empire Darwin was launched on 13 May 1941 and completed in July. The United Kingdom Official Number 168927 and Code Letters BCMQ were allocated. Her port of registry was West Hartlepool. She was operated under the management of Evan T Radcliffe & Co Ltd.

Empire Darwin arrived at Middlesbrough, Yorkshire on 19 July 1941. Three days later, she joined Convoy EC 48, which departed from Southend, Essex on 20 July and arrived at the Clyde on 25 July. On 24 July, Empire Darwin collided with Stockport. On 27 August, Empire Darwin departed from Belfast as part of Convoy ON 10, which had departed from Liverpool, Lancashire that day and dispersed at sea on 11 September. She was bound for Halifax, Nova Scotia, Canada, where she arrived on 13 September. Five days later, she sailed to Sydney, Cape Breton, arriving on 20 September. Empire Darwin was a member of Convoy SC 46, which departed from Sydney on 24 September and arrived at Liverpool on 10 October. She was carrying a cargo of flour and wheat. She left the convoy at Belfast Lough on 10 October. The next day, she joined Convoy BB 87, which arrived at Milford Haven, Pembrokeshire on 13 October. She left the convoy and sailed on to Avonmouth, Somerset, where she arrived the same day.

Empire Darwin departed Avonmouth on 23 October for Milford Haven, arriving the next day and departing the day after that for the Clyde, where she arrived on 27 October. She departed the Clyde on 29 October to join Convoy OG 76, which had departed from Milford Haven on 26 October and arrived at Gibraltar on 11 November. She then made a voyage to Mellila, Morocco and back to Gibraltar, arriving on 22 October. Empire Darwin was a member of Convoy HG 76, which departed from Gibraltar on 14 December and arrived at Liverpool on 30 December. Her destination was Cardiff, Glamorgan, where she arrived on 27 December.

Empire Darwin departed from Cardiff on 18 January 1942 and sailed to Liverpool via Milford Haven. She departed from Liverpool on 26 January as a member of Convoy OG 79, which arrived at Gibraltar on 7 February. On 27 February, she departed Gibraltar for Mellila, returning two days later. Empire Darwin was a member of Convoy HG 80, which departed from Gibraltar on 14 March and arrived at Liverpool on 26 March. She was carrying a cargo of iron ore. She left the convoy at the Barry Roads on 25 March and sailed to Cardiff, arriving on 28 March.

Empire Darwin departed form Cardiff on 5 April for Milford Haven. On 7 April, she sailed from Milford Haven to join Convoy ON 84, which departed from Liverpool on 8 April and arrived at Halifax on 25 April. She embarked her aircraft at Belfast on 8 April. She returned with Convoy SC 82, which departed from Halifax on 30 April and arrived at Liverpool on 16 May. She was carrying a cargo of grain. She left the convoy at the Clyde on 15 May and then sailed to Belfast Lough to join Convoy BB 187, which arrived at Milford Haven on 18 June. She left the convoy for her final destination of Cardiff, where she arrived on 17 June.

Empire Darwin departed from Cardiff on 29 June for Milford Haven, arriving the next day and sailing the day after to Belfast Lough, where she embarked her aircraft and joined Convoy OG86, which had departed from Liverpool on 2 July and arrived at Gibraltar on 14 July. She was carrying 22 cased Supermarine Spitfires and twelve passengers. The Spitfires were bound for Malta.The Spitfires were Mark Vb aircraft. They were assembled at Gibraltar and loaded on board HMS Eagle and flow to Malta as part of Operation Insect. Empire Darwin made a return trip to Mellila and returned to the United Kingdom with Convoy HG 87, which departed from Gibraltar on 7 August and arrived at Liverpool on 18 August. She was carrying a cargo of iron ore. She departed Liverpool on 25 August for Holyhead, Anglesey, arriving the next day and joining Convoy BB 213, which had departed from Belfast Lough that day and arrived at Milford Haven on 26 August. She sailed on to Cardiff, arriving on 27 June. Empire Darwin departed Cardiff on 2 September for Swansea, Glamorgan, arriving the next day.

On 10 September, Empire Darwin departed Swansea for Milford Haven, from where she sailed on 11 September to join Convoy ON 130. That convoy departed from Liverpool on 12 September and arrived at New York, United States on 30 September. She was carrying a cargo of coal with a destination of Halifax, where she arrived on 28 September. She sailed from Halifax three days later, joining Convoy ON 131, which had departed from Liverpool on 18 September and arrived at New York on 4 October. She departed New York the next day for Portland, Maine, arriving on 7 October. Empire Darwin departed from Portland on 23 October for New York, arriving on 25 October, and joining Convoy HX 213, which departed from New York on 26 October and arrived at Liverpool on 10 November. She was carrying a cargo of grain and lorries and 15 passengers. She left the convoy at the Clyde that day.

Empire Darwin departed from the Clyde on 24 December as a member of Convoy KMS6G, which arrived at Bône, Algeria on 8 January 1943. She left the convoy at Algiers on 7 January. She departed from Algiers on 20 January, joining Convoy MKS 6, which had departed from Philippeville, Algeria on 19 January and arrived at Liverpool on 1 February. She left the convoy at Gibraltar, where she arrived on 23 January. On 7 February, she joined Convoy MKS 7, which had departed from Algiers on 5 February and arrived at Liverpool on 17 February. Her destination was Glasgow. She left the convoy at the Clyde on 17 February. At some point during 1943, management of Empire Darwin was passed to Christian Salvesen & Co Ltd, Leith.

Empire Darwin departed from the Clyde on 14 March as a member of Convoy KMS 11G, which arrived at Bône on 28 March. She left the convoy at Algiers on 27 March. On 6 April, she departed from Algiers to join Convoy ET 17, which had departed from Bône on 4 April and arrived at Gibraltar on 9 April. She departed from Gibraltar on 14 April, joining Convoy MKS 11, which had departed from Bône on 10 April and arrived at Liverpool on 23 April. She was carrying a cargo of rails. She left the convoy at the Clyde, arriving on 24 April.

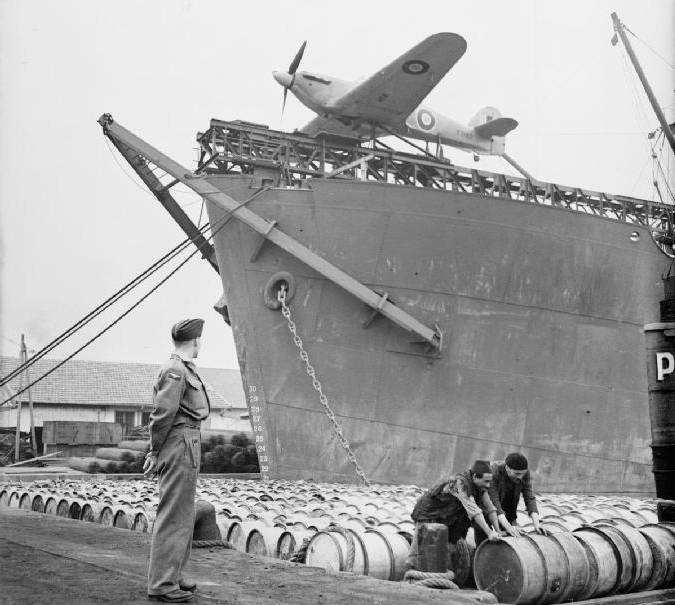
A Hawker Sea Hurricane on the catapult of a CAM ship

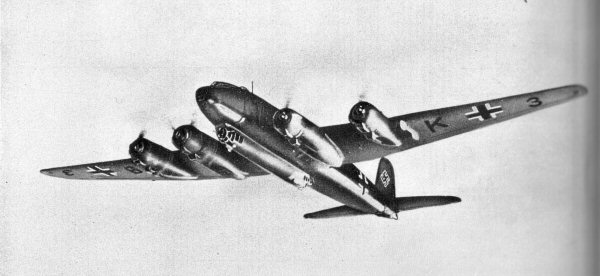
Empire Darwin's Hawker Sea Hurricane shot down a Focke-Wulf Fw 200 Condor, similar to this one, on 28 July 1943

Empire Darwin departed from the Clyde on 20 May to join Convoy KX 10, which departed from Liverpool on 19 May and arrived at Gibraltar on 31 May. She was bound for Algiers, from where she departed on 27 June for Gibraltar, arriving on 29 June. On 1 July, she sailed to Casablanca, Morocco as a member of Convoy GC 18, departing on 19 July as a member of Convoy CG 48. Empire Darwin was a member of Convoy MKS 18G, which departed from Gibraltar on 23 July and rendezvoused with Convoy SL 133 at sea on 26 July. This was the last convoy to operate with CAM ships, which were being withdrawn. There were two CAM ships in the convoy, the other being Empire Tide. On 28 July, her Hawker Sea Hurricane shot down a Focke-Wulf Fw 200 Condor some 800 nautical miles (1,500 km) west of Bordeaux, France. The aircraft crashed into the sea at 43°03′N 16°06′W at 19:45 British Double Summer Time (17:45 GMT). PO Stewart claimed a "probable". He bailed out of his aircraft and was picked up by HMS Leith, on board which he enjoyed a hot bath and a glass of whisky. The next day, Empire Darwin was damaged by enemy bombing at 44°52′N 16°00′W. The combined convoy arrived at Liverpool on 5 August. She was carrying a cargo of phosphates, and left the convoy at Rothesay Bay, Buteshire on 4 August. Two days later, she sailed to Loch Ewe, Ross-shire, from where she joined Convoy WN 465. The convoy departed on 7 August and arrived at Methil, Fife on 9 August. She then joined Convoy FS 1190 which arrived at Southend on 11 August.

Empire Darwin departed from Southend on 5 September as a member of Convoy FN 1118, which arrived at Methil on 7 September. She then joined Convoy EN 278, which departed that day and arrived at Loch Ewe on 9 September. She sailed on to the Clyde, arriving the next day. The bomb damage was repaired in Glasgow. She departed from the Clyde on 26 September to join Convoy KMS 28G, which departed from Liverpool on 26 September and arrived at Gibraltar on 7 October. She was carrying a cargo of stores bound for Italy. She departed Gibraltar that day as a member of Convoy KMS 28, which arrived at Port Said, Egypt on 19 October. Empire Darwin left the convoy at Malta, arriving on 14 October and departing that day as a member of Convoy VN 4. which arrived at Naples, Italy on 16 October. She departed from Naples that day for an unrecorded destination and arrived back at Naples on 25 October. Empire Darwin departed from Naples on 12 November as a member of Convoy NV 8, which arrived at Augusta, Sicily the next day. On 17 November, she joined Convoy MKS 31, which had departed from Port Said on 13 November and arrived at Gibraltar on 23 November. She then joined Convoy OS 59, which departed from Gibraltar on 27 November and arrived at Freetown, Sierra Leone on 8 December. On 10 December, she departed Freetown as a member of Convoy ST 77, which arrived at Takoradi, Gold Coast on 15 December. She departed Takoradi on 26 December for Lagos, Nigeria, arriving two days later and departing on 30 December for Port Harcourt, where she arrived on 31 December.

Empire Darwin departed Port Harcourt on 7 January 1944 for Lagos, where she arrived three days later. On 16 January, she sailed for Freetown, arriving on 23 January. She was a member of Convoy SL 148, which departed from Freetown on 1 February and rendezvoused with Convoy MKS 39 at sea on 12 February. The combined convoy arrived at Liverpool on 24 February. She was carrying a cargo of groundnuts and palm kernels.

Empire Darwin departed from Liverpool on 16 March for Cardiff, arriving two days later. She departed from Cardiff on 30 March for the Belfast Lough, where she arrived on 2 April. On 4 April, she joined Convoy OS 73 km, which had departed from Liverpool the day before and split at sea on 16 April. She was carrying a cargo of coal. Empire Darwin was in the part of the convoy which became Convoy KMS 47G and arrived at Gibraltar the next day. She departed from Gibraltar on 28 April for Tenerife, Spain, where she arrived on 1 May. Three days later, she departed for Las Palmas, arriving on 5 May. The next day, she joined Convoy OS 75, which had formed at sea on 4 May and arrived at Freetown on 14 May. She departed Freetown on 19 May as a member of Convoy ST 81, which arrived at Takoradi on 24 May. A week later, she departed Takoradi as a member of Convoy TS 59, arriving back at Freetown on 7 June. Empire Darwin was a member of Convoy SL 161, which departed Freetown on 11 June and rendezvoused with Convoy MKS 52 at sea on 21 June. The combined convoy arrived at Liverpool on 2 July. She was carrying a cargo of manganese ore.

Empire Darwin sailed from Liverpool on 20 July for the Clyde, arriving the next day. She departed from the Clyde on 11 August to join Convoy OS 86 km, which had departed from Liverpool on 10 August and split at sea on 21 August. She was in the part of the convoy which became Convoy KMS 60. This convoy sailed via Gibraltar to Port Said, arriving on 2 September. Empire Darwin left the convoy at Augusta on 29 August. She then joined Convoy AH 64, which arrived at Bari on 31 August. She left the convoy at Taranto on 30 August. Empire Darwin sailed from Taranto on 15 September, joining Convoy HA 67, which had departed from Augusta that day and arrived at Bari on 17 September. She then joined Convoy GUS 52, which had departed from Port Said on 11 September and arrived at the Hampton Roads, Virginia, United States on 8 October. She left the convoy at Gibraltar on 22 September. Empire Darwin departed Gibraltar on 30 September as a member of Convoy OS 90, which arrived at Freetown on 11 October. She sailed on to Takoradi, arriving on 15 October. She departed from Takoradi on 26 October for Freetown, arriving on 31 October. She departed Freetown on 7 November as a member of Convoy SL 176, which rendezvoused at sea with Convoy MKS 67 at sea on 18 November. The combined convoy arrived at Liverpool on 24 November. Empire Darwin was carrying a cargo of manganese ore and two passengers. She left the convoy at the St Helens Roads, Lancashire on 24 November to join Convoy MTC 46, which arrived at Southend the next day. She departed Southend on 30 November as a member of Convoy FN 1557, which arrived a Methil on 2 December. She left the convoy at Middlesbrough on 1 December.

Empire Darwin then sailed to the Tyne, from where she departed on 23 December as a member of Convoy FS 1675, which had departed from Methil that day and arrived at Southend on 25 December. She then sailed to Milford Haven, from where she departed on 3 January 1945 as a member of Convoy OS102 km, which departed from Liverpool on 2 January and arrived at Gibraltar on 17 January. She was carrying a cargo of coal bound for Casablanca, which she reached as a member of Convoy GC 108, arriving on 14 January. She departed from Casablanca on 22 January for Freetown, arriving on 31 January. She departed Freetown on 7 February for Casablanca, from where she departed on 19 February as a member of Convoy MKS 84G, which had departed from Gibraltar that day and arrived at Liverpool on 27 February. She was carrying a cargo of iron ore. She left the convoy at the Clyde that day.

Empire Darwin departed the Clyde on 11 April to join Convoy OS 122 km, which departed from Liverpool on 12 April and dispersed split at sea on 18 April. She returned to the Clyde with defects reported, arriving on 14 April.

=== Post-war ===
The defects rectified, Empire Clyde departed the Clyde on 21 May as a member of Convoy OS 130 km, which dispersed at 47°56′N 8°39′W on 24 May. Her destination was Naples, where she arrived on 3 June. She departed Naples on 14 June for Gibraltar via Bône, arriving on 25 June and sailing the same day for Antwerp, Belgium, where she arrived on 4 July. She departed four days later for Cardiff, arriving on 10 July.

Empire Darwin departed Cardiff on 15 July for the Cape Henry, Virginia and the Hampton Roads, from where she sailed on 4 August for Charleston, South Carolina, arriving on 8 August. She departed Charleston the next day for Livorno, Italy, arriving on 2 September and departing the same day for Genoa, arriving the next day. Empire Darwin departed Genoa on 7 September for Freetown via Gibraltar, arriving at Freetown on 21 September and departing six days later for the Clyde, where she arrived on 15 October. She departed the Clyde on 26 November for Sydney and Halifax, where she arrived on 11 December.

In 1945, Empire Darwin was sold to her managers. In 1946, Empire Darwin was sold to the South Georgia Co Ltd and was renamed Culrain. She remained under the management of Christian Salvesen. On 26 July 1953, Culrain was on a voyage from Middlesbrough to Bône when she was in collision with the 1,375 GRT Spanish steamship Duero in foggy weather in the Strait of Gibraltar (35°37′N 5°25′W). Duero had been on a voyage from Alicante to Las Palmas. She sank within an hour and a half, but her crew of 27 and single passenger were rescued by Culrain, which was only slightly damaged in the collision. They were transferred to HMS Daring and landed at Gibraltar. In 1959, Culrain was sold to the North Europe & Persian Gulf Transport Corporation, Beirut, Lebanon, and was renamed Mersinidi. She was placed under the Liberian flag, with Monrovia as her port of registry. She was operated under the management of J Livanos & Sons Ltd. Mersinidi arrived on 30 December 1966 at Singapore for scrapping.
