= SS Graigaur =

1941 British cargo ship

History
- Name: Empire Foam (1941–46); Graigaur (1946–57); Maltezana (1957–58); Johore Bahru (1958–63)
- Owner: Ministry of War Transport (1941–45); Ministry of Transport (1945–46); Graigaur Shipping Co Ltd (1946–57); Marinos & Frangios Ltd (1957–58); Great Southern Steamship Co Ltd (1958–63)
- Operator: F Carrick & Co Ltd (1941–46); I Williams & Co Ltd (1946–57); Marinos & Frangios Ltd (1957–58); Great Southern Steamship Co Ltd (1958–63)
- Port of registry: Newcastle upon Tyne, United Kingdom (1941–46); (United Kingdom) Cardiff (1946–58); Hong Kong (1958–63)
- Builder: Swan, Hunter & Wigham Richardson Ltd
- Yard number: 1694
- Launched: 13 March 1941
- Maiden voyage: 10 June 1941
- Identification: United Kingdom Official Number 165810; Code Letters BCKC (1941–58)
- Fate: Scrapped

General characteristics
- Class & type: CAM ship (1941–43); Cargo ship (1943–64)
- Tonnage: 7,047 GRT; 5,178 NRT
- Length: 432 ft 5 in (131.80 m) (LPP); 447 ft 5 in (136.37 m) (OL)
- Beam: 56 ft 2 in (17.12 m)
- Draught: 26 ft 3 in (8.00 m)
- Depth: 34 ft 2 in (10.41 m)
- Installed power: Triple expansion steam engine, 433 nhp
- Propulsion: Single screw propeller
- Aircraft carried: 1 x Hawker Sea Hurricane (1941–43)

Graigaur was a 7,047 GRT cargo ship that was built in 1941 by Swan, Hunter & Wigham Richardson Ltd, Newcastle upon Tyne, Northumberland, United Kingdom, as the CAM ship Empire Foam for the Ministry of War Transport (MoWT). She was sold in 1946 to Graigaur Shipping Co Ltd and renamed Graigaur. She was sold in 1957 to Marinos & Frangos Ltd and renamed Maltezana. She was sold to the Great Southern Steamship Co Ltd., Hong Kong in 1958 and renamed Johore Bahru, serving until she was scrapped in 1963.

== Description ==
The ship was 432 ft 5 in (131.80 m) between perpendiculars (447 ft 5 in (136.37 m) overall), with a beam of 56 feet 2 inches (17.12 m). She had a depth of 34 feet 2 inches (10.41 m) and a draught of 26 feet 3 inches (8.00 m). She was assessed at 7,047 GRT, 5,178 NRT.

The ship was propelled by a 433 nhp triple expansion steam engine, which had cylinders of 23 inches (58 cm), 39 inches (99 cm) and 65 inches (170 cm) diameter by 45 inches (110 cm) stroke. The engine was built by Swan Hunter & Wigham Richardson Ltd. It drove a single screw propeller.

== History ==
The ship was built in 1941 by Swan, Hunter & Wigham Richardson Ltd, Newcastle upon Tyne, Northumberland, United Kingdom. She was yard number 1694. She was launched on 13 March 1941. Her port of registry was Newcastle upon Tyne. The Code Letters BCKC andUnited Kingdom Official Number 165810 were allocated. Empire Foam was operated under the management of F Carrick & Co. Ltd.

Empire Foam made her maiden voyage on 10 June 1941, when she sailed from the River Tyne to join Convoy EC 30, which had departed from Southend, Essex on 7 June and arrived at the Clyde on 14 June. She then joined Convoy OB 338, which departed from Liverpool, Lancashire, on 21 June and dispersed at sea on 3 July. She arrived at Halifax, Nova Scotia, Canada, on 5 July. Carrying a cargo of wheat, she returned to the United Kingdom with Convoy HX 139, which departed on 16 July and arrived at Liverpool on 31 July.

Empire Foam was a member of Convoy ON 6, which departed on 11 August and dispersed at sea on 24 August. Her destination was Halifax, where she arrived on 26 August. She departed on 31 August for Sydney, Cape Breton Island, Nova Scotia, where she arrived the next day. Carrying a cargo of wheat, she joined Convoy SC 43, which departed on 5 September and arrived at Liverpool on 20 September.

Empire Foam was a member of Convoy ON 22, which sailed on 2 October and dispersed at sea on 15 October. Her destination was Halifax, which she reached on 17 October. Carrying a cargo of grain, she returned with Convoy HX 156, which departed on 22 October. On 1 November 1941, her Hawker Sea Hurricane was launched to intercept a Focke-Wulf Fw 200 aircraft, which it chased off. The pilot was recovered by HMS Broke after ditching the aircraft. The convoy arrived at Liverpool on 5 November.

Empire Foam sailed on 19 November with convoy ON 38, which dispersed at sea on 30 November. Her destination was Halifax, where she arrived on 6 December. Carrying a cargo of Grain, she joined Convoy HX 166, which departed on 21 December and arrived at Liverpool on 5 January 1942. She straggled behind the convoy and fell in with Convoy SC 61, which had departed from Sydney on 21 December and arrived at Liverpool on 7 January 1942.

Empire Foam departed from Liverpool on 26 January 1942 to join Convoy OG 79, which had departed from Milford Haven, Pembrokeshire, on 25 January and arrived at Gibraltar on 7 February. She was carrying a cargo of coal. She made a return voyage to Huelva, Spain, before joining Convoy HG 80, which departed on 14 March and arriving at Liverpool on 26 March. She was carrying a cargo of ore.

Empire Foam was a member of Convoy ON 83, which sailed from Liverpool on 4 April and arrived at Halifax on 17 April. Carrying grain, she departed with Convoy HX 187, which sailed on 26 April and arrived at Liverpool on 8 May. Empire Foam sailed on 29 May with Convoy ON 99, which arrived at Boston, Massachusetts, United States, on 12 June. She was carrying a cargo of soda ash. Her destination was Halifax, where she arrived on 10 June. Carrying grain, she returned with Convoy HX 195, which sailed on 21 June and arrived at Liverpool on 2 July.

Empire Foam sailed with Convoy ON 113, which departed on 17 July and arrived at Halifax on 31 July. She then made a return voyage to Father Point, Quebec, via Sydney, travelling out with convoys HS 37 and SQ 25 and returning with convoys QS 26 and SH 35. Carrying grain and general cargo, she returned to the United Kingdom with Convoy HX 204, which sailed on 23 August and arrived on 4 September.

Empire Foam sailed on 7 November to join Convoy KMS 3G, which departed from the Clyde on 8 November and arrived at Bône, Algeria on 26 November. She left the convoy at Gibraltar, where she arrived on 23 November. She sailed on 8 December to join Convoy MKS 3X, which had departed from Bône on 3 December and arrived at Liverpool on 19 December.

Empire Foam sailed from Liverpool on 15 January 1943, arriving at the Clyde two days later. She sailed with Convoy KMS 8G on 21 January and arrived at Bône on 8 February. She departed with Convoy MKS 9 on 4 March. The convoy arrived at Liverpool on 18 March but Empire Foam left the convoy and put into Algiers, Algeria, where she arrived on 6 March. She subsequently returned to Bône, from where she departed on 22 April as a member of Convoy MKS 12, which rendezvoused at sea with Convoy SL 128 on 4 May. The combined convoy arrived at Liverpool on 14 May. She left the convoy at the Clyde, arriving on 14 May.

Empire Foam sailed on 28 July to join Convoy KMS 22G, which had departed from Liverpool that day and arrived at Gibraltar on 9 August. She was carrying explosives bound for Algiers, which was reached via Convoy KMS 22, which sailed that day and arrived at Port Said, Egypt, on 20 August. Empire Foam arrived at Algiers on 12 August. She departed on 11 September to join Convoy MKS 24, which had departed from Alexandria, Egypt, on 4 September and arrived at Gibraltar on 13 September. She sailed on 27 September to join Convoy OS 55, which arrived at Freetown, Sierra Leone on 8 October. She then sailed to Takoradi, Gold Coast, from where she departed on 20 October for Lagos, Nigeria, arriving two days later. She departed on 23 October, returning to Lagos on 9 November. Empire Foam sailed on 21 November with Convoy LTS 9, which arrived at Freetown on 28 November. She then join Convoy SL 142, which departed from Freetown on 2 December and merged with Convoy MKS 33 on 14 December. Her cargo was described as "West African produce" and she was also carrying two passengers. Empire Foam arrived at Loch Ewe on 27 December and joined Convoy WN 524, which arrived at Methil, Fife, on 30 December. She then joined Convoy FS 1316, which departed from Methil that day and arrived at Southend on 1 January 1944. Her destination was Hull, Yorkshire, where she arrived on 1 January.

Empire Foam sailed on 24 January 1944 to join Convoy FN 1245, which had departed from Southend on 23 January and arrived at Methil on 25 January. She then joined Convoy EN 343, which sailed on 7 February and arrived at Loch Ewe on 9 February. Empire Foam sailed on to Oban, Argyllshire, where she arrived on 10 February. She sailed on 13 February to join Convoy ONS 29, which had sailed from Liverpool the previous day and arrived at Halifax on 29 February. She then sailed to Saint John, New Brunswick, returning to Halifax with Convoy FH 109, which sailed on 15 March and arrived two days later. Empire Foam had loaded a cargo of flour. Carrying the Convoy Commodore, she sailed with convoy SC 156, which departed on 29 March and arrived at Liverpool on 13 April. She arrived at the Clyde on 13 April.

Empire Foam subsequently sailed to Liverpool, from where she departed with Convoy OS77KM on 14 May. She was carrying a cargo of ammunition, stores and vehicles. The convoy split at sea on 24 May. Empire Foam was in the part of the convoy which formed Convoy KMS 51G and arrived at Gibraltar on 25 May. She sailed to Algiers, arriving on 30 May and departing on 12 June to join Convoy GUS 42, which had departed from Port Said on 3 June and arrived at the Hampton Roads on 30 June. She left the convoy at Gibraltar, arriving on 14 June. She departed on 21 June with Convoy OS 80, which arrived at Freetown on 1 July. Her destination was Buenos Aires, Argentina, which was reached on 17 July. She sailed the next day for Rosario, Argentina arriving on 19 July and departing on 28 July for Buenos Aires, where she arrived the next day. Empire Foam sailed on 6 August, arriving at Freetown on 28 August. She departed with Convoy SL 169 the next day. The convoy merged with Convoy MKS 60 on 10 September. The combined convoy arrived at Liverpool on 17 September. She left the convoy and arrived at Falmouth, Cornwall, on 16 September. She sailed the next day to join Convoy EBC 105, which had sailed from Barry, Glamorgan, on 16 September and arrived at the Seine Bay on 18 September. She left the convoy at St. Helens Roads and joined Convoy FTM 5A, which had sailed from Seine Bay on 18 September and arrived at Southend the next day. She sailed with Convoy FN 1486 on 20 September. The convoy arrived at Methil on 22 September, but Empire Foam left the convoy at Hull, where she arrived on 21 September.

Empire Foam sailed from Hull on 10 September and joined Convoy FN 1505 at Spurn Head. The convoy had departed from Southend the previous day and arrived at Methil on 11 September. She then joined Convoy EN 445, which sailed that day and arrived at Loch Ewe on 13 September. Empire Foam then joined Convoy ONS 34, which departed from Liverpool on 14 October and arrived at Halifax on 1 November. She left the convoy, and put into the Clyde, where she arrived on 21 October. Empire Foam sailed on 28 October to join Convoy ONS 35, which sailed from Liverpool on 29 October and arrived at Halifax on 15 November. She then joined Convoy XB 134, which sailed that day and arrived at Boston on 17 November. She left the convoy at the Cape Cod Canal and arrived at Philadelphia, Pennsylvania, on 18 November. Empire Foam sailed on 15 December for Boston, from where she departed on 21 December with Convoy BX 138, which arrived at Halifax on 23 December.

Carrying general cargo and explosives, Empire Foam sailed on 1 January 1945 with Convoy SC 164, which arrived at Liverpool on 18 January. She left the convoy at Loch Ewe, on 17 January and joined Convoy WN 669, which reached Methil on 19 January. She then joined Convoy FS 1703, which departed on 20 January and arrived at Southend on 23 January. She left the convoy at Middlesbrough, Yorkshire, arriving on 21 January.

Empire Foam sailed from Middlesbrough on 8 February for the River Tyne, arriving later that day. She sailed on 1 March to join Convoy FS 1743, which had departed from Methil that day and arrived at Southend on 3 March. She sailed to The Downs, departing on 8 March with Convoy OS 115KM, which split at sea on 14 March. Empire Foam was carrying general cargo and was bound for Calcutta, India. She was in the part of the convoy that formed Convoy KMS 89, which arrived at Gibraltar on 16 March. Empire Foam sailed past Gibraltar and reached Calcutta on 26 April via Port Said, Suez, Egypt, Aden and Colombo, Ceylon.

Empire Foam subsequently sailed to Rangoon, Burma, where she arrived on 21 May. She sailed ten days later for Calcutta, arriving on 5 June. Empire Foam made another return trip to Rangoon before returning to Rangoon, from where she departed on 8 July for Cochin, India, arriving on 20 July. She sailed on 28 July for Lourenço Marques, Mozambique, arriving on 18 August. She sailed on 8 September for Aden, where she arrived on 26 September. Empire Foam sailed on 1 October for Suez, where she arrived on 10 October. She then sailed to Port Said and Alexandria, where she arrived on 12 October. She sailed on 23 October for Port Said, arriving the next day. Empire Foam departed from Port Said on 5 November, arriving at The Downs on 24 November and Grangemouth, Stirlingshire, on 27 November. She sailed on 14 December and arrived at Barry on 21 December.

In 1946, Empire Foam was sold to Graigaur Shipping Co Ltd and was renamed Graigaur. Her port of registry was changed to Cardiff and she was placed under the management of Idwal Williams & Co Ltd, Cardiff. During the Suez Crisis, Graigaur made a voyage from Tilbury, Essex, to the Mediterranean. She was carrying military vehicles and supplies.

Graigaur was sold in 1957 to Marinos & Frangos Ltd, London and renamed Maltezana. She was sold in 1958 to Great Southern Steamship Co Ltd, Hong Kong and renamed Johore Bahru. She was in service until 1963, arriving at Kure, Japan, on 24 July 1963 for scrapping, which was done by Osaka Kogai KK, Etajima.
