= SS Hazelbank =

1942 British cargo ship

History
- Name: Empire Franklin (1941–45); Hazelbank (1945–57); Irinicos (1957–63); Iris II (1963–67)
- Owner: Ministry of War Transport (1941–45); Bank Line (1945–57); Compagnia Navigazione Nuevo Mundo SA (1957–62); Paleocrassos Bros (1962–63); Salinas Compagnia Navigazione SA (1963–67)
- Operator: Hall Brothers Steamship Co Ltd (1941); Lamport & Holt Line (1941–45); A Weir Shipping & Trading Co Ltd (1945–57); Syros Shipping Co Ltd (1957–67)
- Port of registry: South Shields, United Kingdom (1941–45); (United Kingdom) Glasgow (1945–57); Panama City, Panama (1957–62); Piraeus, Greece (1962–63); Panama City (1963–67)
- Builder: John Readhead & Sons Ltd
- Yard number: 522
- Launched: 28 April 1941
- Completed: June 1941
- Maiden voyage: 27 June 1941
- Out of service: 1967
- Identification: United Kingdom Official Number 168649 (1941–57); Code Letters BCMB (1941–57); IMO number: 0516298 ( –1967)
- Fate: Scrapped

General characteristics
- Class & type: CAM ship (1941–43); Cargo ship (1943–67)
- Tonnage: 7,292 GRT, 5,111 NRT
- Length: 432 ft 2 in (131.72 m) (LPP); 449 ft 0 in (136.86 m) (OL)
- Beam: 56 ft 7 in (17.25 m)
- Draught: 27 ft 3 in (8.31 m)
- Depth: 34 ft 7 in (10.54 m)
- Installed power: Triple expansion steam engine, 435nhp
- Propulsion: Single screw propeller

Hazelbank was a 6,140 GRT cargo ship built in 1942 as Empire Franklin by John Readhead and Sons Ltd, South Shields, County Durham, United Kingdom for the Ministry of War Transport (MoWT). She was converted to a CAM ship shortly after completion. She was sold to Bank Line in 1945 and was renamed Hazelbank. She was sold Compagnia Navigazione Nuevo Mundo SA, Panama in 1957 and renamed Irinicos. She was sold to Paleocrassos Bros, Greece in 1962 then to Salinas Compagnia Navigazione SA, Panama in 1963 and was renamed Iris II, serving until 1967 when she was scrapped in Hong Kong.

== Description ==
The ship was 432 ft 4 in (131.78 m) long between perpendiculars (449 ft 3 in (137 m) overall), with a beam of 56 feet 7 inches (17.25 m). She had a depth of 34 feet 7 inches (10.54 m) and a draught of 27 feet 3 inches (8.31 m). She was assessed at 7,393 GRT, 5,111 NRT,

The ship was propelled by a 435 nhp triple expansion steam engine, which had cylinders of 25 inches (64 cm), 42 inches (110 cm) and 71 inches (180 cm) diameter by 48 inches (120 cm) stroke. The engines were built by John Readhead & Sons Ltd. It drove a single screw propeller.

== History ==
=== 1941 ===
Empire Fortune was built in 1941 as yard number 522 by John Readhead and Sons Ltd, South Shields, County Durham for the Ministry of War Transport (MoWT). She was launched on 28 April 1941 and completed in June. Her port of registry was South Shields. The United Kingdom Official Number 168649 and Code Letters BCMB were allocated. She was initially operated under the management of Hall Brothers, Empire Franklin was converted to a CAM ship shortly after completion. She was then operated under the management of Lamport and Holt Line.

Empire Franklin made her maiden voyage on 27 June 1941, sailing from the River Tyne to join Convoy EC 38, which had departed from Southend, Essex the previous day and arrived at the Clyde on 1 July. She sailed from the Clyde on 8 July for the Belfast Lough, from where she sailed on 17 July with Convoy OB 347, which had departed from Liverpool, Lancashire the previous day and dispersed at sea on 31 July. She arrived at Halifax, Nova Scotia, Canada on 2 August. Empire Franklin loaded a cargo of grain. She sailed on 10 August with Convoy HX 144, but was transferred to Convoy SC 40, which departed from Sydney, Nova Scotia that day and arrived at Liverpool on 29 August.

Empire Franklin sailed with Convoy ON 16, which departed from Liverpool on 13 September and dispersed at sea on 27 September. She arrived at Halifax on 5 October and sailed five days later for Sydney, where she arrived on 11 October. Carrying a cargo of grain, she sailed that day with Convoy SC 49, which arrived at Liverpool on 27 October. Empire Franklin left the convoy and arrived at the Clyde on 27 October.

Empire Franklin departed from the Clyde on 10 November to join Convoy ON 35, which had sailed from Liverpool the previous day and dispersed at sea on 27 November. However, she left the convoy and put back to the Clyde. She sailed again on 16 November to join Convoy ON 37, which had left Liverpool the day before and dispersed at sea on 30 November. She arrived at Halifax on 4 December. Empire Franklin sailed on 15 December for Sydney, arriving the next day. Laden with wheat, she departed on 21 December with Convoy SC 61, which arrived at Liverpool on 7 January 1942. She left the convoy and returned to Sydney, where she arrived on 27 December.

=== 1942 ===
Empire Franklin sailed on 3 January 1942 with Convoy SC 63, which arrived at Liverpool on 13 January. Again, she left the convoy, arriving at St. John's, Newfoundland on 17 January. She sailed on 2 April to join Convoy SC 77, which had departed from Halifax on 30 March and 30 March and arrived at Liverpool on 30 April.

Empire Franklin sailed on 26 May with Convoy ON 98, which arrived at New York, United States on 12 June. Her destination was Halifax, where she arrived on 11 June. She sailed three days later with Convoy XB 25, which arrived at Boston, Massachusetts, United States on 16 June. She left the convoy at St. John on 16 June. Empire Franklin sailed on 15 July with Convoy BX 29F, which arrived at Halifax the next day. She sailed with Convoy HS 32 on 21 July and arrived at Sydney two days later. Carrying grain, she sailed with Convoy SC 93 on 24 July and arrived at Liverpool on 7 August.

Empire Franklin sailed on 31 August to join Convoy OG 89, which had departed from Milford Haven, Pembrokeshire the previous day and arrived at Gibraltar on 14 September. She was carrying stores and coal. Carrying a cargo of iron ore, she sailed on 12 October with Convoy SL 124G, which merged at sea with convoy SL 124 on 14 October. That convoy had departed from Freetown, Sierra Leone on 3 October and arrived at Liverpool on 22 October. She left the convoy at the Belfast Lough on 21 October, departing the next day with Convoy BB 231, which arrived at Milford Haven the next day. She arrived at Cardiff, Glamorgan later that day.

Empire Franklin departed from Cardiff on 13 November for Newport, Monmouthshire, arriving later that day. She sailed on 24 November for Milford Haven, where she arrived the next day. She sailed with Convoy KX 7 on 30 November, arriving at Gibraltar on 8 December. She sailed two days later for Lisbon, Portugal, where she arrived on 12 December. She sailed on 25 December for Gibraltar, arriving two days later and sailing the day after for Mellila, Spain, where she arrived on 29 December.

=== 1943 ===
Empire Franklin sailed on 5 January 1943 and arrived at Gibraltar the next day. She sailed on 11 January to join Convoy MKS 5, which had departed from Philippeville, Algeria on 5 January and arrived at Liverpool on 22 January. She left the convoy at Loch Ewe on 21 January and then joined Convoy WN 386A, which arrived at Methil, Fife on 23 January. She then joined Convoy FS 1023, which arrived at Southend on 29 January. She left the convoy at Middlesbrough, Yorkshire, arriving on 28 January.

Empire Franklin sailed on 12 February to join Convoy FN 942, which had departed from Southend the previous day and arrived at Methil on 13 February. She then joined Convoy EN 196, which sailed the next day and arrived at Loch Ewe on 17 February. She then joined Convoy ON 169, which sailed from Liverpool on 22 February and arrived at New York on 21 March. She left the convoy at Halifax, arriving on 17 March. Carrying general cargo, she departed on 16 April with Convoy SC 127, which arrived at Liverpool on 3 May.

Empire Franklin sailed on 4 June with Convoy OS 49KM, which split at sea on 13 June. She put back to Liverpool, sailing on 16 June with Convoy OS50KM, which split at sea on 27 June. She was carrying general cargo and stores bound for Takoradi, Gold Coast. Empire Franklin was in the part of the convoy that formed Convoy OS 50 and arrived at Freetown on 8 July. She sailed on 11 July with Convoy ST 72, which arrived at Lagos, Nigeria on 20 July. She arrived at Takoradi on 16 July. She sailed five days later for Lagos arriving on 23 July. She sailed on 29 July for Calabar, Nigeria, where she arrived on 31 July. Empire Franklin departed on 7 August for Lagos, arriving two days later. She sailed on 16 August with convoy LS 10/1, which arrived at Freetown on 23 August. Carrying a cargo of palm kernels, she sailed on 3 September with Convoy SL 136, which rendezvoused at sea with Convoy MKS 24 on 14 September. The combined convoy arrived at Liverpool on 25 September. Empire Franklin left the convoy at Loch Ewe that day and joined Convoy WN 484, which arrived at Methil on 27 September. She then joined Convoy FS 1232, which sailed on 28 September and arrived at Southend on 30 September. She left the convoy at Hull, Yorkshire, arriving that day.

Empire Franklin sailed on 24 October to join Convoy FN 1159, which had departed from Southend the previous day and arrived at Methil on 25 October. She sailed with Convoy EN 306 on 13 November, arriving at Loch Ewe on 16 November. She then joined Convoy OS 59KM, which departed from Liverpool that day and split at sea on 28 November. She was in the part of the convoy that formed Convoy KMS 33G and arrived at Gibraltar on 29 November. She then joined Convoy KMS 33, which sailed from Gibraltar that day and arrived at Port Said, Egypt on 9 December. Empire Franklin left the convoy at Augusta, Sicily, Italy on 5 December. She sailed the next day with Convoy AH 11, which arrived at Bari on 8 December. She left the convoy at Brindisi, Italy that day She sailed on 22 December to join Convoy AH 14, which had sailed from Augusta that day and arrived at Bari on 24 December. She then joined Convoy HA 14, which sailed that day and arrived at Augusta on 26 December. Empire Franklin sailed that day to join Convoy MKS 35, which had sailed from Port Said on 21 December and arrived at Gibraltar on 1 January 1944.

=== 1944 ===
Empire Franklin sailed on 7 January to join Convoy OS 63, which formed at sea that day and arrived at Freetown on 17 January. She sailed on 23 January for Takoradi, arriving on 27 January and sailing three days later to join Convoy TGE 7, which dispersed at sea on 1 February. Her destination was Libreville, French Equatorial Africa, which was reached on 3 February. She sailed later that day for Port Gentil, from where she departed on 13 February for Lagos, arriving on 16 February. Empire Franklin sailed with Convoy LTS 11 on 18 February. It arrived at Freetown on 25 February, She left the convoy at Takoradi that day, sailing on 4 March to join Convoy LTS 12, which had departed from Lagos that day and arrived at Freetown on 11 March. Laden with manganese ore, she sailed with Convoy SL 152 on 13 March. The convoy rendezvoused at sea with Convoy MKS 43 on 23 March. The combined convoy arrived at Liverpool on 4 April. She left the convoy at Loch Ewe and joined Convoy WN 565, which arrived at Methil on 6 April, sailing that day with Convoy FS 1414, which arrived at Southend on 8 April.

Empire Franklin sailed with Convoy FN 1339 on 26 April. The convoy arrived at Methil on 28 April, but she put into the River Tyne on 27 April, sailing two days later to join Convoy FN 1341, which had departed from Southend on 28 April and arrived at Methil on 30 April. She sailed with Convoy EN 379 on 3 May, arriving at Loch Ewe on 5 May. Empire Franklin then joined Convoy ON 236, which departed from Liverpool on 11 May and arrived at New York on 27 May. Her destination was Baltimore, Maryland, where she arrived on 29 May. She sailed on 13 June for New York, arriving two days later. Empire Franklin was a member of Convoy HX 297, which sailed on 24 June and arrived at Liverpool on 11 July.

Empire Franklin departed from Liverpool on 28 July and arrived at the Clyde the next day. She sailed on 11 August to join Convoy ON 248S, which had departed from Liverpool the previous day and arrived at New York on 27 August. She left the convoy and arrived at Montreal, Quebec, Canada on 23 August. She then sailed to the Red Islet, from where she sailed on 4 September with Convoy QS 89, which arrived at Quebec on 8 September. Empire Franklin was damaged and returned to the Red Islet. She sailed with Convoy QS103 on 12 November and arrived at Sydney on 15 November. She then joined Convoy SC 161, which sailed on 17 November and arrived at Liverpool on 4 December. She was carrying fads, grain, general cargo and 7,384 sacks of mail. She left the convoy at Loch Ewe to join Convoy WN 659, which arrived at Methil on 7 December. She then joined Convoy FS 1659, which sailed that day and arrived at Southend on 9 December. She left the convoy at Hull, where she arrived on 9 December.

Empire Franklin sailed on 24 December to join Convoy FN1580, which had departed from Southend the day before and arrived at Methil on 25 December. She then join Convoy EN 465, which arrived at Loch Ewe on 27 December. A solo crossing of the Atlantic Ocean was then made to Halifax. Empire Franklin was a member of Convoy XB 142, which sailed from Halifax on 12 January 1945 and arrived at Boston three days later. She left the convoy at the Cape Cod Canal on 14 January and arrived at New York on 16 January.

=== 1945 ===
She sailed on 26 January with Convoy NG 486, which arrived at Guantanamo Bay, Cuba on 2 February. Having loaded a cargo of sugar, she departed on 22 February with Convoy GN 189, which arrived at New York on 28 February. She departed from New York on 2 March, arriving at Boston the next day and then sailing to Halifax with Convoy BX 148, arriving on 5 March. She on 7 March sailed with Convoy SC 169, which arrived at Liverpool on 21 March. She then sailed to Milford Haven to join Convoy BTC 105, which sailed on 22 March and arrived at Southend on 25 March.

Empire Franklin sailed on 15 April with Convoy TBC 129, which arrived at Milford Haven on 18 April. She then sailed to the Belfast Lough, from where she sailed on 21 April to join Convoy ONS 48, which departed from Liverpool that day and arrived at Halifax on 4 May. She then joined Convoy XB 162, which departed on 5 May and arrived at Boston on 7 May. She left the convoy at the Cape Cod Canal and arrived at New York on 7 May. Empire Franklin departed on 10 May as a member of her final convoy, NK 686, which was bound for Key West, Florida. She left the convoy at Savannah, Georgia on 14 May. She sailed on 25 May for the Hampton Roads, arriving two days later and sailing on 29 May for New York. She sailed on 2 June, arriving at London on 18 June.

Empire Franklin sailed on 12 July for Cape Henry, Virginia, where she arrived on 30 July. She then sailed to the Hampton Roads and New Orleans, Louisiana, arriving on 8 August. She departed on 23 August and arrived at Hull on 14 September. Empire Franklin sailed on 17 October for Houston, Texas, where she arrived on 15 November. She sailed on 27 November for the Hampton Roads, arriving on 4 December and sailing the next day for Liverpool, where she arrived on 21 December.

=== Post WW2 ===
Empire Franklin was sold to Bank Line Ltd and was renamed Hazelbank. Her port of registry was changed to Glasgow. She was operated under the management of A. Weir Shipping & Trading Co Ltd.

In 1957, Hazelbank was sold to Compagnia Navigazione Nuevo Mundo SA, Panama City and was renamed Irinicos. She was operated under the management of Syros Shipping Co Ltd, London. Irinicos was sold to Paleocrassos Bros., Piraeus, Greece in 1962, remaining under Syros's management. She was sold to Salinas Compagnia Navigazione SA, Panama in 1963 and renamed Iris II, still under Syros's management. With their introduction in the late 1960s, Iris II was allocated the IMO Number 0516298. She arrived at Hong Kong on 15 February 1967 for scrapping by Ming Hing & Co.
