= SS Empire Heath =

History

United Kingdom
- Name: Empire Heath
- Builder: Bartram & Sons Ltd, South Dock, Sunderland
- Laid down: 1941
- Launched: 27 April 1941
- Fate: Sunk 11 May 1944

General characteristics
- Type: CAM ship
- Tonnage: 6,643 GRT
- Aircraft carried: Sea Hurricane Mk.1

Empire Heath was a 6,643 GRT cargo ship which was built in 1941 by Bartram & Sons Ltd for the Ministry of War Transport. During the Second World War, she served as a CAM ship, capable of embarking and operating a Hawker Hurricane aircraft.

== History ==
Empire Heath sailed from Belfast on 8 April 1942 arriving at Gibraltar on 20 April with a deck cargo of 28 Supermarine Spitfire aircraft. She sailed again from Cardiff on 28 August arriving at Gibraltar on 14 September with a deck cargo of 16 Spitfires and 2 Hawker Hurricane aircraft. Empire Heath was north west of the small volcanic island of Trindade whilst sailing from Victoria, Brazil to Loch Ewe for orders, via Freetown, with a cargo of iron ore. On 11 May 1944, Empire Heath was located by the German submarine U-129 and discovered to be sailing without an escort northeast of Rio de Janeiro. Initially, U-129 fired three torpedoes at her but all missed. Subsequently, at 23.00 hours, U-129 fired a FAT torpedo which hit and Empire Heath sank rapidly. The U-boat crew rescued Chief Steward Frederick Wakeham, one of the survivors and captured him for questioning. He was landed at Lorient on 19 July and taken to the prisoner of war camp Marlag und Milag Nord. Overall, the master, 46 crew members, one passenger and nine gunners were killed. The wreck is located at 21.31S 29.50W.
