= CAM ship =

British merchant ships with onboard fighter aircraft

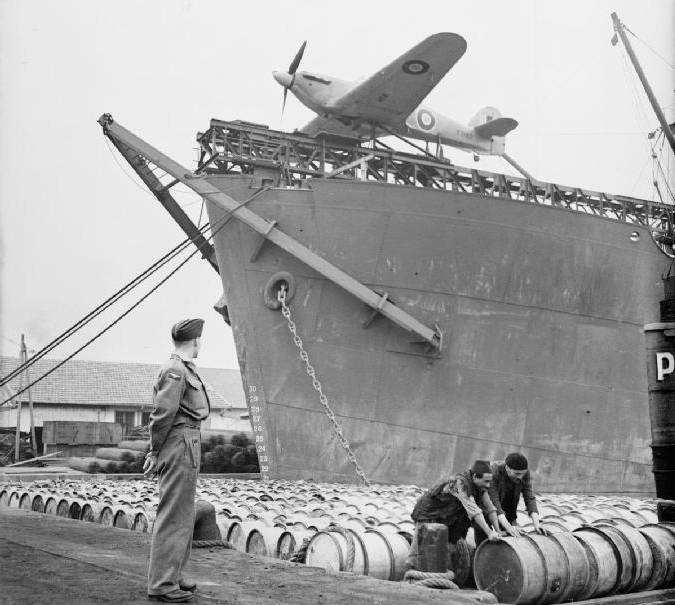
The Hawker Sea Hurricane W9182 on the catapult of a CAM ship

CAM ships were World War II–era British merchant ships used in convoys as a stop-gap until sufficient escort carriers became available. CAM ship is an acronym for catapult aircraft merchant ship.

The ships carried a rocket-propelled catapult to launch a Hawker Hurricane, dubbed a "Hurricat" or "Catafighter" to attack Luftwaffe aircraft. Normally the Hurricane fighter would be lost when the pilot bailed out or ditched in the ocean near the convoy. (Note: On some occasions, the pilot was close enough to an airfield to land there instead.) CAM ships continued to carry their normal cargoes after conversion.

The concept was developed and tested by the five fighter catapult ships, commissioned as warships and commanded and crewed by the Royal Navy – the CAM ships were ordinary merchant vessels, commanded and crewed by the Merchant Navy.

== Origin ==
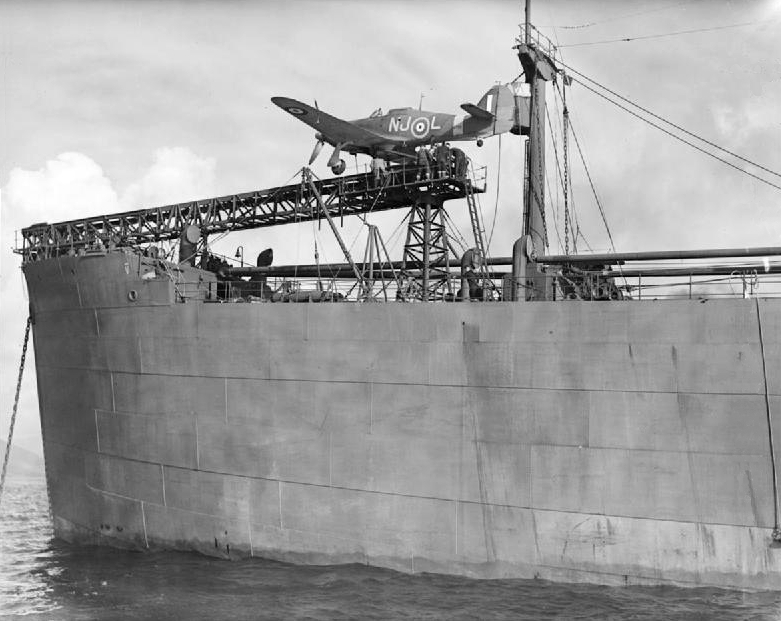
A Hurricane IA before launch during trials at Greenock, in 1941

The Luftwaffe had Focke-Wulf Fw 200 Condor aircraft with a range of nearly 2,000 nmi (3,700 km; 2,300 mi). After the Fall of France, these aircraft could operate from western France against British merchant ships in the Atlantic. Flying from Bordeaux–Mérignac Airport, Fw 200s of I/KG40 could reach the convoy lanes west of Britain while staying outside the range of British land-based fighters. The Royal Navy had no aircraft carriers available to provide close air cover for the convoys. The Fw 200s could shadow convoys, directing U-boat attacks on them, or drop bombs on convoy ships, without opposition and to deadly effect.

To counter this threat, the Admiralty developed the fighter catapult ship – a converted freighter, crewed by naval sailors, carrying a Hurricane fighter. When an enemy bomber was sighted, the fighter would be launched into the air with rockets, and fly up to destroy or drive away the bomber. Being large and slow, the Fw 200 became a rather vulnerable target. After the combat, the fighter pilot would bail out or ditch in the ocean near the convoy, and be picked up if all went well.

The Admiralty had already experimented with this system. They ordered 50 rocket-propelled aircraft catapults to be fitted to merchant ships. The planes were Hurricane Mark Is, converted to Sea Hurricane IAs.

The pilots for these aircraft were drawn from the Royal Air Force (RAF). The RAF formed the Merchant Ship Fighter Unit (MSFU) on 5 May 1941 in RAF Speke by the River Mersey in Liverpool. Wing Commander E.S. Moulton-Barrett commanded the unit providing training for volunteer pilots, fighter direction officers (FDOs), and airmen. After training, MSFU crews were posted to Liverpool, Glasgow, or Avonmouth where they assisted in loading their Hurricanes onto the catapults. Each team consisted of one pilot for Atlantic runs (or two pilots for voyages to Russia, Gibraltar, or the Mediterranean Sea), with one fitter, one rigger, one radio-telephone operator, one FDO, and a seaman torpedoman who worked on the catapult as an electrician.

MSFU crews signed ship's articles as civilian crew under the authority of the civilian ship's master. The ship's chief engineer became responsible for the catapult, and the first mate acted as catapult duty officer (CDO), responsible for firing the catapult when directed. The Hurricane fighter was launched only when enemy aircraft were sighted and agreement was reached using hand and flag signals between the pilot, CDO and ship's master.

The first four or five ships were taken into Royal Navy service as "auxiliary fighter catapult ships", and later conversions were officially named CAMs and crewed by merchant sailors. The first CAM ship, Michael E, was sponsored by the Royal Navy while the RAF MSFUs were working up. After a trial launch off Belfast, Michael E sailed with Convoy OB 327 on 28 May 1941. She was sunk by U-108 on 2 June. The first RAF trial CAM launch was from Empire Rainbow, at Greenock on the River Clyde on 31 May 1941; the Hurricane, flown by Pilot Officer Henry Davidson, landed at Abbotsinch. Six CAM ships joined convoys in June 1941. When a CAM ship arrived at its destination, the pilot usually launched and landed at a nearby airfield to get in as much flight time as possible before his return trip. Pilots were rotated out of CAM assignments after two round-trip voyages to avoid the deterioration of flying skills from the lack of flying time during the assignment.

CAM sailings were initially limited to North American convoys with aircraft maintenance performed by the Royal Canadian Air Force at Dartmouth, Nova Scotia. CAM ships sailed on Gibraltar and Freetown convoys beginning in September 1941, after an aircraft maintenance unit was established at the RAF base at North Front, Gibraltar. No CAM aircraft were provided during January and February 1942 after it proved impossible to maintain the catapult-mounted aircraft in flying order during the North Atlantic winter. CAM sailings resumed on 6 March 1942 on North Atlantic convoys and in April on the Arctic Russian convoys with an RAF aircraft maintenance unit in Arkhangelsk.

== CAM ships ==
Eight CAM ships were requisitioned from private owners, two of which were sunk:

- Daghestan
- Daltonhall
- Eastern City
- Helencrest
- Kafiristan
- Michael E (sunk)
- Novelist
- Primrose Hill (sunk).

Twenty-seven CAM ships were Ministry of War Transport–owned Empire ships, ten of which were sunk:

- Empire Burton (sunk)
- Empire Clive
- Empire Darwin
- Empire Day
- Empire Dell (sunk)
- Empire Eve (sunk)
- Empire Faith
- Empire Flame
- Empire Foam
- Empire Franklin
- Empire Gale
- Empire Heath
- Empire Hudson (sunk)
- Empire Lawrence (sunk)
- Empire Moon
- Empire Morn
- Empire Ocean
- Empire Rainbow (sunk)
- Empire Ray
- Empire Rowan (sunk)
- Empire Shackleton (sunk)
- Empire Spray
- Empire Spring (sunk).
- Empire Stanley
- Empire Sun
- Empire Tide
- Empire Wave (sunk).

== Take-off procedure ==
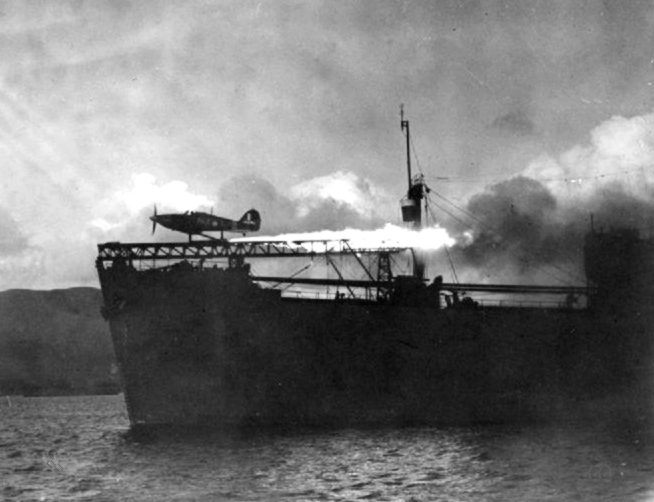
Test launch of a Hurricane at Greenock, Scotland on 31 May 1941

(Taken from Wise [1974])

- The trolley receiving bar was removed at dawn
- The airmen started the aircraft and warmed up the engine at intervals
- The pilot climbed into the aircraft when enemy aircraft were reported
- The ship hoisted the international flag code F when the decision was made to launch. (CAM ships were usually stationed at the head of the outboard port column of a convoy so they could manoeuvre into the wind for launch)
- An airman removed the pins, showed them to the pilot, and took them to the Catapult Duty Officer (CDO)
- The pilot applied 30 degrees of flap and 1/3 right rudder
- The CDO raised a blue flag above his head to inform the ship's master of his readiness to launch
- The ship's master manoeuvred the ship into the wind and raised a blue flag above his head to authorise the launch. (The ship's master stood on the starboard bridge wing to avoid the catapult rocket blast which sometimes damaged the port side of the bridge)
- The CDO waved his blue flag indicating he was ready to launch upon a signal from the pilot
- The pilot opened full throttle, tightened the throttle friction nut, pressed his head back into the head-rest, pressed his right elbow tightly against his hip, and lowered his left hand as a signal to launch
- The CDO counted to three, waited for the bow to rise from the trough of a swell, and moved the switch to fire the catapult rockets

== CAM combat launches ==
Operational CAM launches
Date	Ship	Convoy	Pilot	Notes
1941
1 Nov	SS Empire Foam	HX 156	FO George Varley	Fw 200 seen off; pilot recovered, HMS Broke
1942
26 April	SS Empire Morn	QP 12	FO John Kendal	BV 138 seen off, Ju 88, III./KG 30 shot down; pilot died of injuries bailing out
26 May	SS Empire Lawrence	PQ 16	PO Alistair Hay	2 He 111s, Hurricane shot down, pilot wounded, recovered, HMS Volunteer
14 June	SS Empire Moon	HG 84	PO A. Vernon Sanders	Fw 200 seen off; pilot recovered, HMS Stork
18 Sep	SS Empire Morn	PQ 18	FO 'Jackie' Burr	2 He 111s destroyed; pilot landed Keg Ostrov (Кегостров [остров]).
1 Nov	SS Empire Heath	HG 91	FO Norman Taylor	Fw 200 shot down; pilot nearly drowned
1943
28 July	SS Empire Darwin	SL 133	FO 'Jimmy' Stewart	Fw 200 shot down; pilot recovered, HMS Leith
28 July	MV Empire Tide	SL 133	FO 'Paddy' Flynn	Fw 200 shot down; pilot recovered, HMS Enchantress

There were eight combat launches from CAM ships. Eight German aircraft were destroyed (three FW 200 Condors, four Heinkel He 111s and a Junkers Ju 88) one damaged and three chased away. Eight Hurricanes were ditched and one pilot lost. A Condor was destroyed in August 1941 by a Hurricane launched from a Royal Navy Fighter Catapult Ship flown by Robert Everett.

== Aftermath ==
As adequate numbers of escort carriers became available, CAM sailings on North American and Arctic Russian convoys were discontinued in August 1942 and the aircraft maintenance unit was withdrawn from Archangelsk in September. Catapults were removed from ten of the 26 remaining CAM ships while the last 16 continued to sail with Mediterranean and Freetown convoys. Headquarters RAF Fighter Command ordered all MSFUs to be disbanded commencing 8 June 1943. The combat launches from homeward bound Convoy SL 133 were from the last two operational CAM ships to sail; the last MSFU was disbanded on 7 September 1943. Twelve of the 35 CAM ships had been sunk while sailing on 170 round trip voyages. Two ships, Cape Clear and City of Johannesburg, were briefly fitted with dummy catapults and aircraft for deception in late 1941.

== See also ==
- Aviation-capable naval vessel – Ship capable of supporting aircraft activities
- Brodie landing system – Method of launching and landing light aircraft
- Fighter catapult armed auxiliary ship – Type of Royal Navy warship
- Merchant aircraft carrier – British and Dutch civilian limited-purpose aircraft carriers used in WWII

== Bibliography ==
- Barker, Ralph (2019) [1978]. Hurricats: The Incredible True Story of Britain's 'Kamikaze' Pilots of World War Two. London: Silvertail Books. ISBN 978-1-90-926986-6.
- Forczyk, Robert (2010). FW 200 Condor vs. Atlantic Convoy 1941−1943. Oxford: Osprey. ISBN 978-1-84603-917-1.
- Hague, Arnold (2000). The Allied Convoy System 1939–1945. Annapolis, MD: Naval Institute Press. ISBN 1-55750-019-3.
- Mitchell, W. H.; Sawyer, L. A. (1990) [1965]. The Empire Ships: A Record of British-built and acquired Merchant Ships during the Second World War (2nd ed.). London (New York, Hamburg, Hong Kong): Lloyd's of London Press. ISBN 1-85044-275-4.
- Wise, James E. (September 1974). "Catapult Off–Parachute Back". United States Naval Institute Proceedings. 100 (9/859): 70–77. ISSN 0041-798X.
