= SS Empire Clive =

World War II merchant ship of the United Kingdom

History
- Name: Empire Clive (1941-46); Charlebury (1946-58); Isabel Erica (1958-69)
- Owner: Ministry of War Transport (1941-46); Alexander Shipping Co Ltd (1946-58); Red Anchor Line Ltd (1958-64); St Merryn Shipping Co (1964-69)
- Operator: Capper, Alexander & Co Ltd (1941-46); Houlder Bros Ltd (1946-58); Red Anchor Line Ltd (1958-64); C Moller (1964-69)
- Port of registry: (United Kingdom) Liverpool (1941-46); (United Kingdom) London (1946-58); Hong Kong (1958-69)
- Builder: Cammell Laird & Co Ltd
- Yard number: 1061
- Launched: 28 July 1941
- Completed: August 1941
- Identification: Code Letters BCNM (1941-58); United Kingdom Official Number 168801 (1941-58)
- Fate: Scrapped

General characteristics
- Type: Cargo ship
- Tonnage: 7,069 GRT; 5,194 NRT
- Length: 432 ft 2 in (131.72 m)
- Beam: 56 ft 2 in (17.12 m)
- Depth: 34 ft 2 in (10.41 m)
- Installed power: Triple expansion steam engine
- Propulsion: Screw propeller
- Armament: 1 x Hawker Hurricane aircraft (Empire Clive)

Empire Clive was a 7,069 GRT cargo ship which was built in 1941 by Cammell Laird & Co Ltd, Birkenhead for the Ministry of War Transport (MoWT). During the Second World War, she served as a CAM ship, armed with a Hawker Hurricane aircraft. In 1946 she was sold and renamed Charlebury. In 1958, she was sold to Hong Kong and renamed Isabel Erica. She served until 1969 when she was scrapped.

== Description ==
The ship was built by Cammell Laird & Co Ltd, Birkenhead as yard number 1061. She was launched on 28 July 1941 and completed in August.

The ship was 432 feet 2 inches (131.72 m) long, with a beam of 56 feet 2 inches (17.12 m) and a depth of 34 feet 2 inches (10.41 m). She had a GRT of 7,069 and a NRT of 5,194.

The ship was propelled by a triple expansion steam engine, which had cylinders of 23 1/2 inches (60 cm), 37 1/2 inches (95 cm) and 68 inches (170 cm) diameter by 48 inches (120 cm) stroke. The engine was built by Cammell Laird.

== History ==
Empire Clive was built for the MoWT. She was placed under the management of Capper, Alexander & Co Ltd. Her port of registry was Liverpool. The Code Letters BCNM and United Kingdom Official Number 168801 were allocated.

Empire Clive was a member of a number of convoys during the Second World War.

SC 58

Convoy SC 58 departed from Sydney, Cape Breton on 4 December 1941 and arrived at Liverpool on 21 December. Empire Clive was due to sail with this convoy.

HX 164

Convoy HX 164 departed from Halifax, Nova Scotia on 8 December 1941 and arrived at Liverpool on 23 December. Empire Clive was listed in this convoy, but sailed with Convoy SC 59.

SC 59

Convoy SC 59 departed from Sydney, Cape Breton on 10 December 1941 and arrived at Liverpool on 27 December. Empire Clive, at the time a CAM ship, sailed with this convoy. She was carrying general cargo bound for Avonmouth, Somerset.

On 19 July 1942, Empire Clive loaded ten Supermarine Spitfire aircraft. They were delivered to Malta on 3 August.

MKS 16

Convoy MKS 16 departed from Gibraltar on 9 July 1943. It joined Convoy SL 132 at sea on 10 July and arrived at Liverpool on 22 July. Empire Clive was carrying a cargo of phosphates bound for Glasgow.

In 1946, Empire Clive was sold to Alexander Shipping Co Ltd and was renamed Charlebury. She was placed under the management of Houlder Bros Ltd, London. In 1958, she was sold to the Red Anchor Line, Hong Kong and renamed Isabel Erica In 1963, she was sold to the St Merryn Shipping Co, and placed under the management of C Moller & Co, Hong Kong. Isabel Erica was scrapped in August 1969 in Hong Kong.
