= William Gray & Company =

- Industry: Shipbuilding
- Founded: 1863
- Defunct: 1962
- Fate: Voluntary liquidation
- Headquarters: West Hartlepool, England
- Key people: John Punshon Denton; Sir William Gray; Sir William Cresswell Gray, Bt. Sir William Gray, Bt.

William Gray & Company Ltd. was a British shipbuilding company located in West Hartlepool, County Durham, in North East England. Founded in 1863 by John Denton and William Gray as a partnership, it became a private and then a public limited company under the leadership of three generations of the Gray family until finally wound up in 1962.

== Company history ==
=== Denton, Gray & Co. ===
In 1839 John Punshon Denton established a shipyard in Middleton, Hartlepool to build and repair wooden-hulled sailing ships. In 1863 Denton entered into a partnership with William Gray, a successful businessman with a chain of stores in Hartlepool, to form Denton, Gray and Company. The shipyard was modernised and extended, and began to build iron-hulled ships. Their first ship was launched on 23 January 1864. In 1865 Denton, Gray and Co. established a new partnership with the shipbuilders Richardson, Duck and Co. of Stockton-on-Tees, and marine engine builders T. Richardson and Sons called Richardson, Denton, Duck and Co. However, business was poor, and the partnership only completed only four ships before being dissolved in September 1866, when the companies returned to their original ownership and names. In 1867-68 Denton, Gray and Co. expanded their premises, taking over a neighbouring shipyard in 1868, which allowed them to diversify their business into ship repairs. In 1869 the company moved to a larger yard in West Hartlepool which covered eight acres, and employed up to 1,200 men.

The partnership ended on John Denton's death in 1871. By this time Denton and Grey were in dispute over which of their sons should be allowed to join as partners. The case had gone to court, but as the company had been founded with no formal signed contracts, the courts were unable to reach a decision. Eventually Denton's sons left the company, and in 1874 it was renamed William Gray & Company, and Gray took on his eldest son Matthew as partner.

=== William Gray & Co. ===
The business flourished, and in 1878 Gray's held the British record for output, with 18 ships launched in a single year, and the company soon became West Hartlepool's largest producer of iron clipper barques, sailing ships and steamers. Now employing some 2,000 men, the company recorded the highest output of any British shipyard six times between 1878 and 1900.

In 1883 Gray's established the Central Marine Engineering Works, to manufacture their own marine engines, recruiting the engineer Thomas Mudd from T. Richardson and Sons to set up the business.

On 1 January 1889 Gray's became a private limited company, with William Gray as chairman, and his sons Matthew and William, and son-in-law George Henry Baines, as directors. In recognition of his numerous charitable works, and tenure as Mayor of West Hartlepool, William Gray was knighted in 1890. Between 1892 and 1895 one of the key customers for the company was the Shell Transport and Trading Company who had eight oil tankers built.

Matthew Gray died in 1896, followed in 1898 by both Sir William Gray and Thomas Mudd, which left Sir William's younger son, William Cresswell Gray, as chairman. He expanded the company, purchasing the Milton Forge and Engineering Company, allowing Gray's to increase its production of marine engines, boilers, pumps and other machinery. In association with Sir Christopher Furness, he also bought the Moor Steel and Iron Works of Stockton-on-Tees, the Stockton Malleable Iron Works, and the West Hartlepool Steel and Iron Works, which were amalgamated into a new company, the South Durham Steel and Iron Company Ltd., which provided the materials to build Gray's ships. In 1900 two more slipways were built, making a total of eleven, and the company now employed 3,000 men, who built 200 ships up to the outbreak of World War I in 1914.

The war brought an increase in activity to the shipyard, and by 1918, Gray's had built 30 cargo liners and tramp steamers, 13 vessels for the Admiralty, including four M15-class monitors, and 30 standard "War-class" cargo ships for the Shipping Controller. A facility was also established at the Central Marine Engine Works, employing mainly women, to produce shell cases. On 14 June 1917 King George V and Queen Mary visited the shipyard as part of a morale-boosting visit to the area, and on 7 July 1917 William C. Gray was created 1st Baronet Gray of Tunstall Manor.

In 1918 Gray's became a public company. However, in the early 1920s the company experienced financial difficulties owing to the post-war slump in the freight market, which was flooded with war-surplus vessels. In 1922 the company built only three ships, and in 1923 only seven. In 1924 Sir William Cresswell Gray died, and the chairmanship of the company passed to his son, Sir William Gray, 2nd Bt. He had to manage a company heavily in debt, but despite this the company completed its 1,000th ship in 1929.

In 1930, when the Great Depression struck, the shipyard was closed due to lack of orders. In 1932 the yard temporarily re-opened to build a Tees pilot launch and six tramp steamers, before being closed again. In 1934 the yard re-opened to build two paddle steamers to provide a passenger ferry service across the River Humber. In 1935 the yard reopened briefly to build a tramp steamer, which was not sold for another two years. Not until 1936 did business began to improve, and in the years up to 1939, the company completed thirty tramp steamers and cargo liners, and two Halcyon-class minesweepers for the Royal Navy. The outbreak of World War II saw a revival in activity with 72 ships built and 1,750 ships repaired between 1939 and 1945.

Post-war, British ship production went into general decline with the emergence of Japanese and German shipbuilders. Gray's built an average of only 7.5 ships per year, along with a number of tankers, between 1945 and 1959. In 1959 the only orders on the books were for two ore carriers. The last ship built by Gray's was launched in 1961. Repair work continued into 1962, until the company finally went into voluntary liquidation.

== See also ==
- Gray Baronets
- Eggleston Hall
