= MV Empire Faith =

World War II merchant ship of the United Kingdom

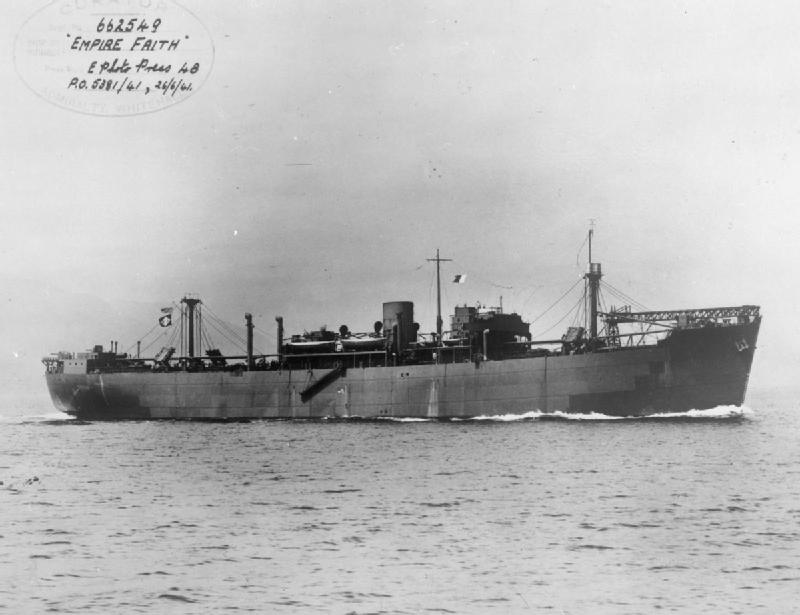

History
- Name: Empire Faith (1941–46); Jessmore (1946–58); Antiope (1958–64); Global Venture (1964–71)
- Owner: Ministry of War Transport (1941-45); Ministry of Transport (1945–46); Johnson Warren Lines Ltd (1946–47); Furness-Warren Line Ltd (1947–58); Maritime & Commercial Corporation Ltd (1958–64); Global Navigation Co Inc (1964-71)
- Operator: Ellerman Lines Ltd (1941-42); Johnson Warren Lines Ltd (1942–47); Furness-Warren Line Ltd (1947–58); Maritime & Commercial Corporation Ltd (1958–64); Wah Kwong & Co (1964-71)
- Port of registry: Glasgow, United Kingdom (1941–58); Panama City, Panama (1958–71)
- Builder: Barclay, Curle & Co Ltd
- Yard number: 681
- Launched: 4 March 1941
- Out of service: August 1971
- Identification: United Kingdom Official Number 168678 (1941–58); Code Letters BCJK (1941–58)
- Fate: Scrapped

General characteristics
- Class & type: CAM ship (1941–45); Cargo ship (1945-71)
- Tonnage: 7,078 GRT; 4,194 NRT; 10,350 DWT
- Length: 418 ft 0 in (127.41 m)
- Beam: 57 ft 4 in (17.48 m)
- Draught: 27 ft 6 in (8.38 m)
- Depth: 34 ft 2 in (10.41 m)
- Installed power: 688 nhp / 3,300 bhp
- Propulsion: 2SCSA diesel engine, single screw propeller
- Speed: 11.5 knots (21.3 km/h)
- Armament: 1 × Hawker Sea Hurricane; 1 × 4-inch or 4.7-inch gun; 1 × 3-inch or 12-pounder gun; 4 × machine guns (Empire Faith)

Empire Faith was a 7,061 GRT CAM ship that was built in 1941 by Barclay Curle & Co, Glasgow, Renfrewshire, United Kingdom for the Ministry of War Transport (MoWT). Converted to a cargo ship in 1943, she was sold to a British company in 1946 and renamed Jessmore. In 1958, she was sold to a Panamanian company and renamed Antiope. A further sale in 1964 saw her renamed Global Venture. She served until 1971, when she was scrapped.

== Description ==
The ship was built in 1941 by Barclay Curle & Co, Glasgow, Renfrewshire. She was yard number 681.

The ship was 418 feet 0 inches (127.41 m) long, with a beam of 57 feet 4 inches (17.48 m). She had a depth of 34 feet 2 inches (10.41 m), and a draught of 27 feet 6 inches (8.38 m). She was assessed at 7,078 GRT, 4,194 NRT, 10,350 DWT.

The ship was propelled by a two-stroke Single Cycle, Single Action diesel engine, which had four cylinders of 23 5/8 inches (62 cm) diameter by 91 7/16 inches (232 cmm) stroke driving a screw propeller. The engine was built by Barclay Curle. It was rated at 688 nhp, 3,300 bhp. It could propel her at 11.5 knots (21.3 km/h).

== History ==
=== World War II ===
Empire Faith was launched on 4 March 1941 and completed in June. The United Kingdom Official Number 168676 and Code Letters BCJK were allocated. Her port of registry was Glasgow and she was initially placed under the management of Ellerman Lines Ltd.

Empire Faith departed the Clyde on 14 June 1941 and sailed to the Belfast Lough. She departed on 21 June with Convoy OB 338, which sailed from Liverpool, Lancashire that day and dispersed at sea on 3 July. Empire Faith left the convoy and sailed to the Clyde, arriving on 22 June. She sailed on 27 June to join Convoy OB 339, which had departed from Liverpool the previous day and arrived at Halifax, Nova Scotia, Canada on 12 July. Laden with a cargo of grain, she returned with Convoy HX 140, which departed on 22 July and arrived at Liverpool on 6 August.

Empire Faith was a member of Convoy ON 8, which departed from Liverpool on 16 August, called at Reykjavík, Iceland on 21 August and dispersed at sea on 25 August. She was bound for Halifax, where she arrived on 30 August. She sailed the next day for New York, United States, arriving on 2 September. Ten days later, Empire Faith sailed for Halifax, arriving on 14 September. Carrying general cargo, she joined Convoy HX 150, which departed on 16 September and arrived at Liverpool on 30 September.

Empire Faith was a member of Convoy ON 28, which departed on 20 October and dispersed at 42°23′N 58°44′W on 3 November. She was bound for Halifax, arriving that day. On 4 November, she sailed for Saint John, New Brunswick, arriving the next day and sailing on 10 November for Halifax, where she arrived on 11 November. Carrying a cargo of grain, she returned with Convoy HX 160, which departed on 15 November and arrived at Liverpool on 30 November. She was carrying a Hawker Sea Hurricane with the Squadron Code XS-J.

Empire Faith was a member of Convoy ON 50, which departed on 24 December and dispersed at sea on 3 January 1942. She was bound for Halifax, arriving on 5 January. Laden with grain, she returned with Convoy HX 171, which departed on 20 January and arrived at Liverpool on 1 February.

Empire Faith was a member of Convoy ON 69, which departed on 20 February and dispersed off Cape Cod, Massachusetts on 6 March. She was carrying the convoy's Vice Commodore and was bound for Halifax, arriving on 4 March. She sailed on 7 March for Saint John, returning to Halifax on 16 March. Laden with grain, she joined Convoy HX 181, which departed on 21 March and arrived at Liverpool on 2 April.

Empire Faith Was a member of Convoy ON 89, which departed on 23 April and arrived at Halifax on 5 May. She returned with Convoy HX 190, which sailed on 17 May and arrived at Liverpool on 28 May. Empire Faith was carrying a cargo of grain. She was one of several ships that detached from the convoy to form a "fast section". She joined Convoy ON 101, which departed on 5 June and arrived at Boston, Massachusetts, United States on 18 June. She was bound for Halifax, arriving on 16 June. Carrying grain, she returned with Convoy HX 195, which departed on 21 June and arrived at Liverpool on 2 July.

Empire Faith was a member of Convoy ON 113, which departed from Liverpool on 17 July and arrived at Halifax on 31 July. She was bound for New York, She sailed on 15 August for the Hampton Roads, Virginia. She joined Convoy KS 532, which departed on 19 August and arrived at Key West, Florida on 26 August. She then joined Convoy WAT 117, which sailed that day and arrived at Guantanamo Bay, Cuba on 1 September. Off Guantanamo Bay, Empire Faith joined Convoy GAT 1, which had departed on 31 August and arrived at Trinidad on 7 September. On 10 September, she sailed for Cape Town, South Africa, where she arrived on 2 October. She departed the next day for Bombay, India, arriving there on 23 October. Empire Faith sailed on 16 November for Colombo, Ceylon arriving on 19 November and sailing on 3 December for Cape Town. She arrived on 21 December and sailed the next day for New York, arriving on 21 January 1943. Carrying general cargo and the Convoy Commodore, Empire Faith departed on 30 January with Convoy HX 225, which arrived at Liverpool on 13 February. During 1942, management was transferred to Warren Johnston Lines Ltd.

Empire Faith was a member of Convoy ON 170, which departed on 3 March and arrived at New York on 20 March. She was bound for Halifax, arriving on 19 March. She then joined Convoy HF 43, which sailed the next day and arrived at Saint John on 22 March. She returned to Halifax as a member of Convoy FH 45A, which departed on 29 March and arrived on 31 March. On 4 April, Empire Faith sailed to join convoy HX 232, which had departed from New York on 1 April and arrived at Liverpool on 16 April. She was carrying grain.

Empire Faith was a member of Convoy ON 180, which sailed on 24 April and arrived at New York on 14 May. She was bound for Halifax, arriving on 12 May. She sailed on 2 June to join Convoy HX 242, which had departed from New York on 31 May and arrived at Liverpool on 15 June. Her cargo consisted armoured fighting vehicles and grain. She left the convoy at the Belfast Lough and joined Convoy BB 300, which arrived at Milford Haven, Pembrokeshire on 16 June. Her final destination was Avonmouth, Somerset, where she arrived on 17 June. The CAM ship programme ceased in June 1943 and Empire Faith was converted to a standard cargo ship.

Empire Faith sailed for Milford Haven on 28 June, arriving the next day. She sailed on 30 June to join Convoy ON 191, which departed from Liverpool on 1 July and arrived at New York on 15 July. She sailed on to Baltimore, Maryland, arriving on 16 July. Empire Faith departed on 4 August for New York, arriving two days later. Carrying explosives and general cargo, she then joined Convoy HX 251, which departed on 7 August and arrived at Liverpool on 23 August.

Empire Faith was a member of Convoy OS55 km, which departed on 17 September and split at sea on 28 September. Convoy OS 55 arrived at Freetown, Sierra Leone on 8 October. Empire Faith was in the section of the convoy which formed KMS 27 and arrived at Gibraltar on 29 September. She was carrying general cargo and her armament consisted a 4-inch or a 4.7-inch gun, a 3-inch or a 12-pounder gun and 4 machine guns. She then joined Convoy KMS 27, which departed that day and arrived at Port Said, Egypt on 11 October. Empire Faith sailed the next day. She may have visited İskenderun and Mersin, Turkey, before arriving at Haifa, Palestine, on 5 November. She sailed that day for Port Said, arriving the next day. Empire Faith sailed on 13 November for Haifa, arriving the next day and sailing nine days later for Port Said, where she arrived on 24 November, departing the next day for Alexandria, where she arrived on 26 November. She joined Convoy GUS 23, which departed on 27 November and arrived at the Hampton Roads on 25 December. Her destination was Gibraltar, where she arrived on 6 December. She joined Convoy MKS 33, which departed on 13 December and rendezvoused at sea with Convoy SL 142 on 14 December. The combined convoy arrived at Liverpool on 28 December. Empire Faith was carrying bromide and potash, as well as three bags of mail and two passengers. She was bound for Loch Ewe, arriving on 27 December.

Empire Faith arrived at Belfast, County Antrim on 10 January 1944. She sailed on 27 January for Newport, Monmouthshire, arriving on 30 January. She departed from Newport on 29 April for the Belfast Lough, arriving the next day. She sailed on 2 May to join Convoy OS76 km, which had departed from Liverpool that day and split at sea on 13 May. Convoy OS 76 arrived at Freetown on 22 May. Empire Faith was in the portion of the convoy that formed KMS 50 and arrived at Gibraltar on 15 May. She was carrying general cargo. She joined Convoy KMS 50, which departed that day and arrived at Alexandria on 25 May. She departed on 3 June for Port Said, arriving the next day and then sailed to Kosseir, from where she departed on 9 June for Aden, arriving on 14 June. Empire Faith was a member of Convoy AB 41, which departed on 16 June and arrived at Bombay on 24 June. She detached from the convoy, sailing to Melbourne, Victoria, Australia, where she arrived on 19 July.

Empire Faith sailed on 7 September for Adelaide, South Australia, arriving two days later. She departed on 8 October for Port Lincoln, where she arrived on 10 October. Ten days later, she sailed for Colombo, arriving on 10 November. She departed on 14 November for Madras, India, arriving three days later. Empire Faith sailed on 9 December for Cochin, where she arrived on 12 December. She departed the next day for Lourenço Marques, Mozambique, arriving on 27 December.

Empire Faith sailed on 1 January 1945 for Aden, arriving on 15 January. She departed on 28 January for Abadan, Iran, arriving on 4 February and departing nine days later for Karachi, India, where she arrived on 18 February. She sailed on 22 February for Bombay, arriving two days later. Empire Faith sailed on 5 March for Mombasa, Kenya, where she arrived on 14 March. She sailed a fortnight later for Diégo-Suarez, Madagascar, arriving on 31 March. On 4 April, Empire Faith sailed for Mauritius, where she arrived on 8 April. She departed on 26 April for Durban, South Africa, arriving on 2 May and sailing six days later for Port Elizabeth, arriving on 9 May. She departed on 12 May for Cape Town, arriving two days later and sailing on 16 May for Gibraltar, where she arrived on 5 June. She sailed that day for Liverpool, arriving on 10 June.

=== Post-war ===
Empire Faith sailed on 17 July for Port Said, arriving on 30 August. She then sailed to Suez, from where she departed on 1 August for Aden, arriving four days later. She departed that day for Sydney, New South Wales, Australia, arriving on 31 August. Empire Faith sailed from Sydney on 19 October for Melbourne, arriving two days later. She departed on 2 November for Madras, where she arrived on 23 November. On 8 December, Empire Faith sailed for Vizag, where she arrived two days later. She departed on 17 December for Madras, arriving on 19 December for a five-day stay.

In 1946, Empire Faith was sold to Johnston Warren Lines and was renamed Jessmore. In 1947, the company was taken over by Furness Withy to become Furness-Warren Line. In July 1948, part of her cargo was seized as a prize of war in Palestine. In 1958, Jessmore was deemed to be no longer suitable for Furness Withy's requirements. She was sold to Maritime & Commercial Corporation Ltd, Panama and renamed Antiope. She was operated under the management on Wah Kwong & Co, Hong Kong. Antiope arrived in August 1971 at Kaohsiung, Taiwan for scrapping.
