= List of Empire ships (B) =

== Suffix beginning with B ==
=== Empire Baffin ===
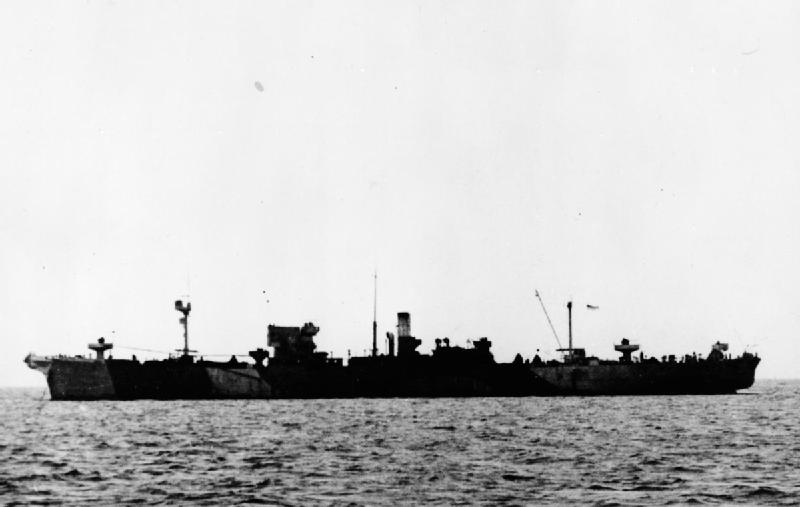
HMS Sancroft

Empire Baffin was a 6,978 GRT cargo ship that was built by Lithgows Ltd, Port Glasgow. She was launched on 28 August 1941 and completed in October 1941. In May 1942 she was a member of Convoy PQ 16. Damaged by bombing but managed to reach the Kola Inlet. Commissioned in 1943 as Sancroft and converted to a cable layer for Operation Pluto. Renamed Empire Baffin in 1946. Sold to Stag Line Ltd later that year and renamed Clintonia. Operated under the management of J Robinson & Sons, North Shields. Sold in 1960 to Alcestis Shipping Co, SA and renamed Aspis. Operated under the management of Faros Shipping Co Ltd, London. Scrapped at Yokosuka, Japan in December 1963.

=== Empire Bairn ===
Empire Bairn was an 813 GRT coastal tanker which was built by Blythswood Shipbuilding Co Ltd, Glasgow. Launched on 23 October 1941 and completed in December 1941. To Indian Navy in 1948 as INS Chilka. Removed from Indian Navy list in 1976.

=== Empire Balfour ===
Empire Balfour was a 7,201 GRT cargo ship which was built by Lithgows Ltd, Port Glasgow. Launched on 27 June 1944 and completed in September 1944. Sold to Houlder Bros & Co Ltd in 1949 and renamed Barton Grange. Sold in 1958 to the Western Steamship Co Ltd and renamed Sunlight. Operated under the management of Wang Kee and Co Ltd, Hong Kong. Sold in 1962 to the Pan-Norse Steamship Co Ltd, Panama. Operated under the management of Wallem & Co Ltd, Hong Kong. Arrived at Hong Kong for scrapping 30 March 1967.

=== Empire Balham ===
Empire Balham was a 1,061 GRT cargo ship which was built by George Brown and Co (Marine) Ltd, Greenock. Launched on 18 December 1944 and completed in May 1945. Sold in 1946 to Queenship Navigation Ltd and renamed Nordic Queen. Operated under the management of Coast Lines Ltd. Sold in 1958 to Maldavian National Trading Corporation (Ceylon) Ltd and renamed Maldive Star. Scrapped in December 1972 at Gadani Beach, Pakistan.

=== Empire Ballad ===
Empire Ballad was a 6,640 GRT cargo ship which was built by Bartram & Sons Ltd, Sunderland. Launched on 17 December 1941 and completed in March 1942. Sold in 1946 to Alexander Shipping Co Ltd and renamed Bibury. Operated under the management of Houlder Bros Ltd. Sold in 1951 to Halcyon Lijn NV, the Netherlands and renamed Stad Massluis. Sold in 1962 to Compagnia Navigazione Jaguar and renamed Jaguar. Operated under the management of Palomba & Salvatori, Italy. Sold in 1966 to Olamar S.A. and renamed Goldfield, still under the same management. Sold in 1968 to Compagnia de Navigazione Sulamar and renamed Poseidon. Operated under the management of V Coccoli, Italy. Ran aground in September 1969 and put into Naples. Sold for scrap and arrived under tow at Split, Yugoslavia on 21 November 1969.

=== Empire Ballantyne ===
Empire Ballantyne was a 6,959 GRT cargo ship which was built by Harland & Wolff Ltd, Glasgow. Launched on 21 October 1941 and completed in February 1942. Sold to the Belgian Government in 1943 and renamed Belgian Airman. Sunk by U-879 on 14 April 1945 in Chesapeake Bay (36°09′N 74°05′W).

=== Empire Baltic ===
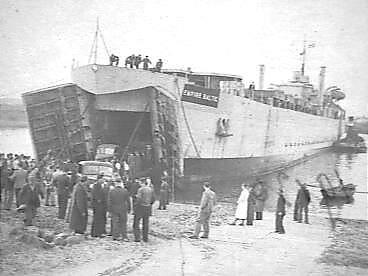
Empire Baltic

Empire Baltic was built as LST 3519 by Canadian Vickers Ltd. Launched in September 1945. Chartered to Atlantic Steam Navigation Company in 1946 and renamed Empire Baltic. Rebuilt by Harland & Wolff Ltd, Tilbury as a vehicle ferry. Management passed to the British-India Line in 1961. Arrived at Spezia, Italy for scrapping on 10 July 1962.

=== Empire Bank ===
Empire Bank was a 402 GRT coaster which was built by Henry Scarr Ltd, Hessle. Launched on 12 April 1941 and completed in August 1941. Sold in 1946 to Metcalfe Motor Coasters Ltd, London and renamed Rose-Julie M. Sold in 1956 to MAC Shipping Co Ltd, Glasgow. Operated under the management of TJ Metcalf, London. Scrapped in January 1966 at Queenborough, Kent.

=== Empire Banner ===
Empire Banner was a 6,699 GRT cargo ship which was built by Bartram & Sons Ltd, Sunderland. Launched on 29 June 1942 and completed in September 1942. Sunk by U-77 on 7 February 1943 off Algeria (36°48′N 01°32′E).

=== Empire Barbados ===
Empire Barbados was a 3,538 GRT cargo ship which was built by Wm Gray & Co Ltd, West Hartlepool. Launched on 28 December 1944 and completed in March 1945. Sold in 1948 to the Rodney Steamship Co Ltd and renamed Tennyson. Operated under the management of the Anglo-Danubian Shipping Co Ltd, London. Sold in 1950 to T Stone (Shipping) Ltd and renamed Berylstone. Operated under the management of Stone & Rolfe Ltd, Swansea. Sold in 1960 to Compagnia Navigazione Zannis and renamed Manticos. Operated under the management of A Halcoussis & Co, Greece. Developed a leak 210 nautical miles (390 km) south of Dakar, Senegal on 8 October 1963. Although a tug assisted with pumping the ship out from 16 October, Manticos sank on 22 October.

=== Empire Barbara ===
Empire Barbara was a 275 GRT tug which was built by Cochrane & Sons Ltd, Selby. Launched on 5 October 1944 and completed in February 1945. To the Admiralty in 1947 and renamed Adept. Sold to the Government of Ceylon and renamed Aliya. Allocated to the Royal Ceylon Navy. Refitted in 1964. Sold to Steel Corporation of Sri Lanka for scrapping in 1978.

=== Empire Bard ===
Empire Bard was a 3,114 GRT heavy-lift ship which was built by Caledon Shipbuilding & Engineering Co Ltd, Dundee. Launched on 30 December 1941 and completed in March 1942. Sold in 1946 to Dundee, Perth & London Shipping Co Ltd, Dundee and renamed Angusburn. Sold to Rederei A/B Hildegaard in 1955 and renamed Brettenham. Operated under the management of F Lundqvist, Finland. Arrived at Cartagena, Spain on 14 April 1971 for scrapping.

=== Empire Bardolph ===
Empire Bardolph was a 7,017 GRT cargo ship which was built by Short Brothers Ltd Sunderland. Launched on 8 December 1942 and completed in March 1943. Sold in 1946 to Lamport & Holt Line Ltd and renamed Memling. Sold in 1953 to Blue Star Line and renamed Vancouver Star. Renamed Memling in 1957. Arrived at Vlissingen on 23 October 1959 for scrapping.

=== Empire Barkis ===
Empire Barkis was a 340 GRT coastal tanker which was built by Rowhedge Iron Works Ltd, Rowhedge, Essex. Launched on 8 June 1944 and completed in August 1944. Sold to Van Castricum & Co Ltd, London and renamed Sodok. Sold in 1947 to Shell Company of Singapore Ltd and renamed Guntur. Sold in 1962 to Madam Dolly Seah, Singapore. Sold in 1972 to P T Perusahaan Pelyaran Palka Utama, Indonesia.

=== Empire Barnaby ===
Empire Barnaby was a 222 GRT water carrier which was built by W. J. Yarwood & Sons (1938) Ltd, Northwich. Launched on 2 May 1944 and completed in July 1944. Sold in 1967 to J Havens, London. Departed Brest on 24 June for Vianna, Portugal. Reported overdue on 4 July. Found by a Spanish fishing boat and towed to Santoña, Spain where she was declared unseaworthy. Detained due to salvors not being paid.

=== Empire Baron ===
Empire Baron was a 5,894 GRT cargo ship built by Cantiere Navale Triestino, Trieste. Launched in 1926 as Monte Piana for Navigazione Generale Geromilich & Co, Trieste. Beached at Aden on 12 June 1940 after crew attempted to scuttle her when intercepted by the Royal Navy. Attempts to repair unsuccessful, towed to Vizagapatam, India by SS Nirvana in February 1941 where repaired. Sold in 1947 to Navigation & Coal Trade Ltd, London, and renamed Rubystone. Sold in 1951 to Alvion Steamship Co, Panama. Scrapped at Nagasaki, Japan in August 1960.

=== Empire Barracuda ===
Empire Barracuda was a 4,926 GRT cargo ship which was built by American International Shipbuilding, Hog Island, Pennsylvania. Launched in 1918 as Sacandaga for United States Shipping Board (USSB). Sold in 1918 to Carolina Co. Operated under the management of American Palmetto Line. Returned to USSB in 1925. Sold in 1932 to American Diamond Lines, and renamed Black Heron. To MoWT in 1941 and renamed Empire Barracuda. Sunk on 15 December 1942 by U-77 west of Gibraltar (35°30′N 06°17′W).

=== Empire Barrie ===
Empire Barrie was a 7,168 GRT cargo ship which was built by J L Thompson & Sons Ltd, Sunderland. Launched on 17 January 1942 and completed in April 1942. Sold in 1945 to Clan Line Steamers Ltd and renamed Clan Alpine. Sold in 1957 to Bullard, King & Co and renamed Umvoti. Resold to Clan Line in 1959 and reverted to Clan Alpine. Sold for scrapping with a delivery date of November 1960. Broke moorings at Chittagong, East Pakistan on 31 October 1960 during a cyclone and driven 11 nautical miles (20 km) inland from the mouth of the Chittagong River. Scrapped in situ February 1961.

=== Empire Bascobel ===
Empire Bascobel was a 418 GRT tug which was built in the Bethlehem Elizabethport shipyard, New Jersey. Launched as Bascobel in 1919 for the USSB. Sold in 1922 to Gulf Coast Transportation Co, New Orleans. Sold in 1928 to Tennessee Coal, Iron & Railway Co. To United States Maritime Commission (USMC) in 1936. To MoWT in 1941 and renamed Empire Bascobel. Returned to USMC in 1946, renamed Bascobel. Sold to Universal Tank Cleaning Corp in 1954 and then Standard Tank Cleaning Corp in 1958. Sank on 18 December 1961 at Mariners Harbor, New York. Declared a constructive total loss, scrapped in New York in December 1963.

=== Empire Battleaxe ===
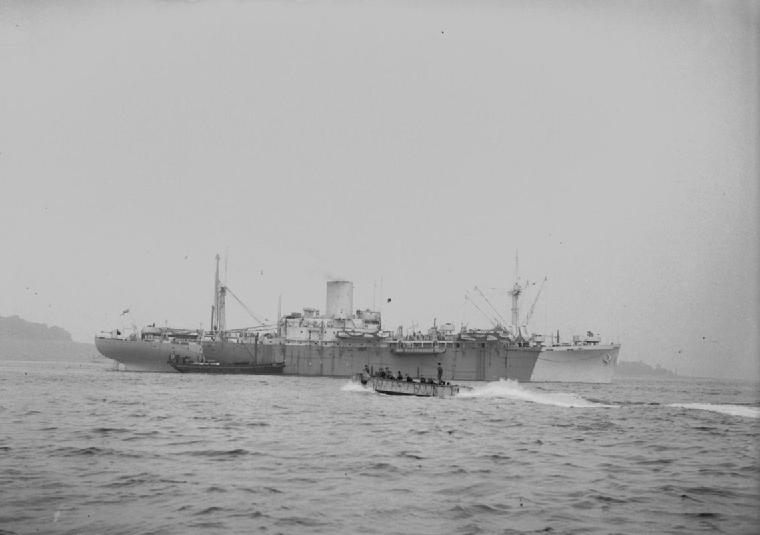
Empire Battleaxe

Empire Battleaxe was a 7,177 GRT LSI which was built by Consolidated Steel Corporation, Wilmington, Los Angeles. She was laid down as Cape Berkeley and completed as Empire Battleaxe in October 1943. Became HMS Donovan in 1946 and reverted to Empire Battleaxe later that year. To USMC in 1947 and renamed Cape Berkeley in 1948. Proposed sale to China as Hai C fell through later that year, then renamed Empire Battleaxe. Laid up in James River, Virginia. Scrapped at Kearny, New Jersey May 1966.

=== Empire Baxter ===
Empire Baxter was a 7,079 GRT cargo ship which was built by Vickers-Armstrongs Ltd, Barrow in Furness. Launched on 8 October 1941 and completed in December 1941. Sold in 1946 to Reardon Smith Line Ltd and renamed Paris City. Sold in 1954 to Duff, Herbert & Mitchell Ltd, Liverpool and renamed Westford. Sold in 1958 to Compagnia Atlantica-Pacifica, Panama and renamed Severn River. Sold in 1959 to R & E Sadikloğu Ortaktari, Turkey and renamed Hüseyin Kaptan. Scrapped at Haliç in 1963.

=== Empire Bay ===
Empire Bay was a 2,824 GRT collier which was built by William Gray & Co Ltd, West Hartlepool. Launched on 20 August 1940 and completed in November 1940. Bombed, broke in two and sank in Tees Bay, off Middlesbrough on 15 January 1942. The wreck lies at 54°41′08″N 1°08′36″W.

=== Empire Beacon ===
Empire Beacon was an 879 GRT coaster which was built by Scott & Sons Ltd, Bowling. Launched on 29 September 1941 and completed in November 1941. Struck a mine and sank 6 nautical miles (11 km) from St Ann's Head, Pembrokeshire, Wales (51°41′N 05°10′W) on 5 April 1942.

=== Empire Beaconsfield ===
Empire Beaconsfield was a 2,905 GRT cargo ship which was built by William Gray & Co Ltd, West Hartlepool. Launched on 2 October 1943 and completed in November 1943. Sold in 1946 to Constants (South Wales) Ltd, Cardiff and renamed Hawkinge. Sold in 1951 to Dundee, Perth & London Shipping Company, Dundee and renamed Angusbrae. Sold in 1956 to Willem H Müller & Co NV, Rotterdam and renamed Hispania. Sold in 1960 to West End Corporation, Panama, and renamed Dia. Developed a leak and sank south of Savona, Italy (44°12′N 08°38′E) on 14 October 1964.

=== Empire Beatrice ===
Empire Beatrice was a 7,046 GRT cargo ship which was built by Lithgows Ltd, Port Glasgow. Launched on 23 February 1942 and completed in April 1942. Torpedoed on 27 July 1944 by German E-boats in the Strait of Dover (50°55′N 01°02′E) and beached at Dungeness. Patched up and towed to the Thames Estuary on 2 August 1944 by tugs Empire Betsy and Empire Humphrey. To Tilbury on 20 September and later towed to Glasgow for repairs including a new stern. Sold in 1946 to Cheriton Shipping Co Ltd and renamed Beatrice N. Operated under the management of P B Pandelis Ltd, London. Sold in 1952 to N G Kyrakides Shipping Ltd, London, and renamed Mary K. Sold in 1964 to Winchester Shipping Co Ltd and renamed Winchester Prowess. Operated under the management of G O Till, London. Sold in 1966 to B Bottigliere di Giuseppe, Naples and renamed Grazia Bottigliere. Scrapped at Split, Yugoslavia in March 1969.

=== Empire Beaumont ===
Empire Beaumont was a 7,044 GRT cargo ship which was built by Furness Shipbuilding Company, Haverton Hill-on-Tees. Launched on 31 March 1942 and completed in June 1942. Attacked by aircraft from KG26 and sunk on 13 September 1942 at 76°10′N 10°05′E while a member of Convoy PQ 18.

=== Empire Beauty ===
Empire Beauty was a 7,297 GRT cargo ship which was built by William Doxford & Sons Ltd, Sunderland. Launched on 8 April 1943 and completed in July 1943. Sold in 1946 to E Rasmussen, Norway, and renamed Polycrown. Sold in 1962 to Lamda Shipping Enterprises, Lebanon and renamed Ioannis Aspiotis. Sold in 1968 to Laurel Shipping Co Ltd, Cyprus and renamed Laurel. Scrapped in January 1969 at Kaohsiung, Taiwan.

=== Empire Beaver ===
Empire Beaver was a 6,086 GRT refrigerated cargo ship which was built by the G. M. Standifer Construction Company, Vancouver, Washington in 1919 as Waban for USSB. Sold in 1933 to Lykes Brothers-Ripley Steamship Co Inc. To MoWT in 1940 and renamed Empire Sambar. Boiler room explosion on 6 March 1941. Repaired and renamed Empire Beaver. To Norwegian Government in 1942 and renamed Norhauk. Struck a mine and sank in the Thames Estuary on 21 December 1943 (51°50′12″N 01°33′14″E).

=== Empire Becky ===
Empire Becky was a 244 GRT tug which was built by Henry Scarr Ltd, Hessle. Launched on 2 December 1944 and completed in February 1945. Sold in 1947 to Steel & Bennie Ltd and renamed Forager. Capsized and sank in the River Clyde on 23 May 1962. Refloated on 5 June. Sold to Societa Rim. Napoletani, Italy and renamed Mastino. Scrapped in March 1984 in Naples.

=== Empire Bede ===
Empire Bede was a 6,959 GRT cargo ship which was built by Harland & Wolff Ltd, Glasgow. Launched on 6 January 1942 and completed in March 1942. Damaged by a torpedo from U-553 at 19°35′N 76°25′W and sunk by gunfire from Pimpernel at 19°41′N 76°50′W on 18 August 1942 while a member of convoy TAW 13.

=== Empire Belgrave ===
Empire Belgrave was an 890 GRT coastal tanker which was built by A & J Inglis Ltd, Glasgow. Launched on 16 March 1945 and completed in June 1945. Sold to F T Everard & Sons Ltd and renamed Aqueity. Struck a mine off Terschelling, Netherlands, and sank on 11 November 1947.

=== Empire Bell ===
Empire Bell was a 2,023 GRT collier which was built as Belgia in 1930 by Öresundsvarvet, Landskrona for F Sternhagen, Gothenburg. Bombed and set on fire by enemy aircraft on 26 January 1941 in the Thames Estuary. Salvaged on 14 February 1941 and towed to Harwich. Sold to UK and passed to MoWT, renamed Empire Bell. Sunk by U-442 south of Iceland (62°19′N 15°27′W) on 25 September 1942.

=== Empire Belle ===
Empire Belle was a 257 GRT tug built by John Crown & Sons Ltd, Sunderland. Launched on 31 October 1943 and completed in February 1944. To the Admiralty in 1947 and renamed Elf. Sold to Impresse Maritime Augustea, Italy and renamed Mare Jonio. Transferred to Italian Navy in 1972.

=== Empire Ben ===
Empire Ben was a 242 GRT tug which was built by J S Watson Ltd, Gainsborough. Launched on 22 December 1942 and completed in March 1943. Sold in 1948 to Leith Salvage & Towage Co Ltd and renamed E Nicholson. Sold in 1951 to Melbourne Harbour Trust Commissioners, Melbourne and renamed Victor. Sold in 1957 to Geelong Harbour Trust Commissioners, Geelong. Sold in 1968 to R J Pherson, Melbourne and then sold to J H Nicholls, Melbourne in 1970.

=== Empire Benefit ===
Empire Benefit was an 8,202 GRT tanker which was built by Harland & Wolff Ltd, Belfast. Launched on 24 November 1942 and completed in April 1943. Sold in 1945 to Athel Line Ltd and renamed Athelqueen. Sold in 1955 to Mariblanca Navigazione SA and renamed Mariverda. Operated under the management of Chandris (England) Ltd. Arrived at Kure on 6 September 1961 for scrapping.

=== Empire Beresford ===
Empire Beresford was a 9,804 GRT tanker which was built by Sir J Laing & Sons, Sunderland. Launched on 15 September 1943 and completed in December 1943. Sold in 1945 to Stanhope Steamship Co Ltd and renamed Stanbell. Operated under the management of J A Billmeir. Converted in 1955 to an ore carrier of 14,810 DWT. Sold in 1960 to Malaya Shipping Co, Hong Kong, and renamed Kelantan. Operated under the management of United Shipping & Investment Co Ltd, Hong Kong, and then Gibson Shipping Co Inc, Macao. Scrapped in March 1965 at Hirao.

=== Empire Bermuda ===
Empire Bermuda was a 3,539 GRT cargo ship which was built by William Gray & Co Ltd, West Hartlepool. Launched on 30 September 1944 and completed in November 1944. Sold in 1949 to the Indo-China Steam Navigation Co Ltd, London, and renamed Hewsang. Sold in 1963 to Sunshine Navigation Co Ltd, Panama, and renamed Sunshine. Operated under the management of Patt Manfield & Co Ltd, Hong Kong. Scrapped at Kaohsiung in March 1970.

=== Empire Bess ===
Empire Bess was a tug which was built by Clelands (Successors) Ltd, Willington Quay-on-Tyne. Launched on 26 April 1945 and completed in July 1945. Sold in 1946 to the United Towing Co Ltd and renamed Merchantman. Sold in 1962 to Societe Rim. Napoletani and renamed Tarentum. Scrapped in 1982 in Naples.

=== Empire Betsy ===
Empire Betsy was a 275 GRT tug which was built by Cochrane & Sons Ltd, Selby. Launched on 14 December 1943 and completed in May 1944. Sold in 1947 to Bataansch Petroleum Maatschappij, Netherlands and renamed Soegio. Struck a mine and sank on 12 February 1948 in Macassar Strait, Borneo (2°36′S 116°33′E).

=== Empire Billow ===
Empire Billow was a 215 GRT water carrier which was built by W. J. Yarwood & Sons Ltd, Northwich. Launched in 1943 and completed in June 1943. To the Admiralty in 1946. Scrapped in Antwerp in October 1963.

=== Empire Birch ===
Empire Birch was a 244 GRT tug which was built by Henry Scarr Ltd, Hessle. Launched on 9 August 1941 and completed in December 1941. Hit a mine 150 nautical miles (280 km) north of Lourenço Marques (24°45′S 34°47′E) on 10 August 1942. Although beached and abandoned, Empire Birch slid off the beach and sank in deep water.

=== Empire Birdsay ===
Empire Birdsay was the intended name of the 5,122 GRT ship that was built by Shipbuilding Corporation Ltd, Newcastle upon Tyne. Launched on 16 August 1947 and completed in December 1947 as Zarian for United Africa Co Ltd, which became Palm Line Ltd in 1949 and she was renamed Lokoja Palm. Sold in 1966 to Compagnia Navigazione Kea, Panama and renamed Despina L. Sold in 1969 to Nova Shipping Co Ltd, Cyprus, and renamed Nova. Operated under the management of Pergamos Shipping Co Ltd. Scrapped in China in December 1971.

=== Empire Bison ===
Empire Bison was a 5,612 GRT cargo ship which was built by the Southwestern Shipbuilding Company, San Pedro, California. Launched in 1919 as the SS West Cawthon for the USSB. To Green Star Steamship Corporation in 1920. To USSB in 1923, then American South African Line Inc in 1926. To MoWT in 1940 and renamed Empire Bison. Torpedoed and sunk by U-124 on 1 November 1940 at 59°30′N 17°40′W, a straggler from Convoy HX 82.

=== Empire Bittern ===
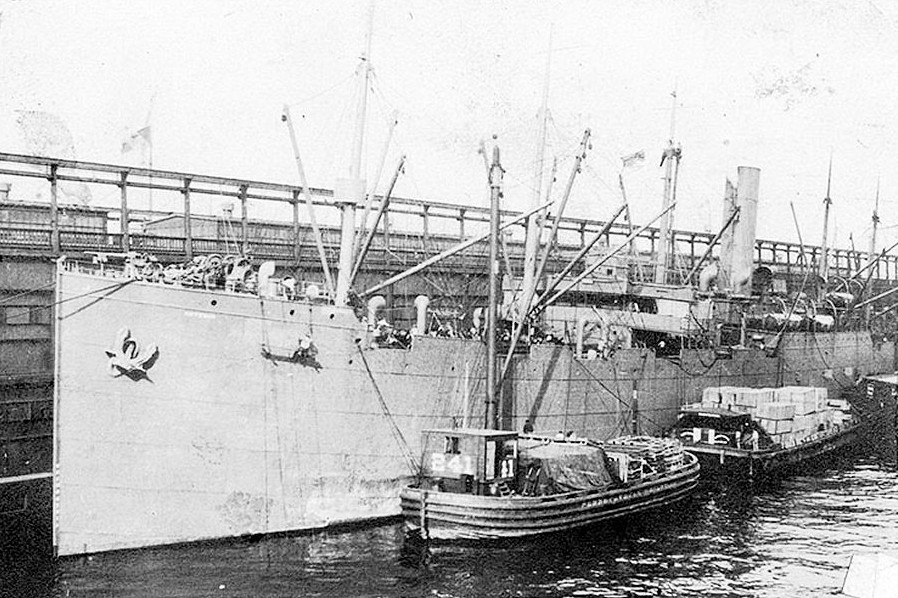
US Army Chartered Transport Artemis

SS Empire Bittern was an 8,546 GRT passenger ship which was built by Harland & Wolff Ltd, Belfast. Completed in 1902 as Iowa for the White Diamond Steamship Co Ltd, operated under the management of G Warren & Co Ltd. sold in 1913 to Hamburg America Line and renamed Bohemia. Requisitioned by the United States Government in 1917 and passed to the USSB, renamed Artemis in 1917. WW I USSB Army chartered and briefly post war U.S.N. troopship. To MoWT in 1940, renamed Empire Bittern, sunk as an additional blockship as part of Operation Overlord on 23 July 1944.

=== Empire Blackwater ===
Empire Blackwater was a 2,917 GRT cargo ship which was built by Flensburger Schiffbau Gesellschaft, Flensberg. Launched in 1939 as Pompeji, seized at Kiel as war prize in 1945. To MoWT, renamed Empire Blackwater. To USMC in 1946. Sold in 1946 to Seatrade Corporation, New York. Sold in 1949 to Baase & Co, Copenhagen and renamed Krusaa. Sold in 1960 to Nils Berg, Finland, and renamed Krucia. Sold in 1969 to H Hayrynen O/Y, Finland and renamed Helvi. Sold in 1971 to Nan Sing Navigation Co, Taiwan, and renamed Eastern Faith. Scrapped at Kaohsiung, Taiwan in December 1975.

=== Empire Blanda ===
Empire Blanda was a 5,693 GRT cargo ship which was built by Lithgows Ltd, Port Glasgow. Launched in 1919 as Nile. Sold in 1930 to Jugoslovenska Plovidba DD and renamed Sokol. Sold in 1939 to Compagnia Panamena de Vapores, Panama and renamed Rio Grande. Operated under the management of T & N Coumantaros Ltd, Greece. Requisitioned in 1940, to MoWT as Empire Blanda. Torpedoed on 19 February 1941 & sunk by U-69 south of Iceland.

=== Empire Blessing ===
Empire Blessing was a 7,064 GRT cargo ship which was built by Bartram & Sons Ltd, Sunderland. Launched on 1 October 1943 and completed in January 1944. Mined and sunk on 19 March 1945 before the coast of Knokke, Belgium (51°24′N 03°17′E).

=== Empire Blossom ===
Empire Blossom was a 6,603 GRT cargo ship which was built by Taikoo Dockyard & Engineering Company of Hong Kong Ltd. She was laid down in May 1941 but captured in December 1941 when ready for launching. Engine & boilers intended for Empire Blossom were sent to Singapore on 1 December 1941 on the Blue Funnel Line ship Ulysses. Ship completed in 1943 by Japanese as Kemba Maru. Sunk by torpedo 4 December 1943 by aircraft from USS Lexington.

=== Empire Bombardier ===
Empire Bombardier was an 8,202 GRT tanker which was built by Harland & Wolff Ltd, Belfast. Launched on 8 August 1942 as Empire Fusilier. Completed February 1943 as Empire Bombardier. Sold in 1946 to British Tanker Co and renamed British Bombardier. Arrived on 15 March 1959 at Tamise, Belgium for scrapping.

=== Empire Bond ===
Empire Bond was a 2,088 GRT cargo ship which was built by William Gray & Co Ltd, West Hartlepool. Launched in 1906 as Ravelston for the Ravelston Steamship Co Ltd. Requisitioned in 1941 and renamed Empire Bond. Sold in 1946 to Rethymnis & Kulukundis, London and renamed Prenton, sold later that year to J Kattoula, Liverpool. Ran aground off Mytiki, Nikopoli Bay, Greece on 9 February 1949. Refloated and arrived at Preveza on 13 February. Declared a constructive total loss. Prenton was sold and repaired, passing to Argo Maritime Transport Co, Greece in 1950 and renamed Agios Dionysis. Sold in 1951 to D G Coucoumbanis, Greece, and renamed Sandenis. Sold later that year to G Frangistis, Greece, and renamed San Denis. Scrapped at Savona, Italy in 1959.

=== Empire Boswell ===
Empire Boswell was a 2,898 GRT cargo ship which was built by William Gray & Co Ltd, West Hartlepool. Launched on 2 June 1942 and completed in August 1942. Sold in 1947 to Aviation & Shipping Co Ltd and renamed Aviswell. Operated under the management of Purvis Shipping Co Ltd, London. sold in 1949 to F T Everard & Son Ltd and renamed Seniority. Ran aground on 7 November 1950 at Leinish Point, Inner Hebrides (56°57′N 7°25′W). Refloated but sank off Bo Vich Chuan Rock on 8 November 1950.

=== Empire Bounty ===
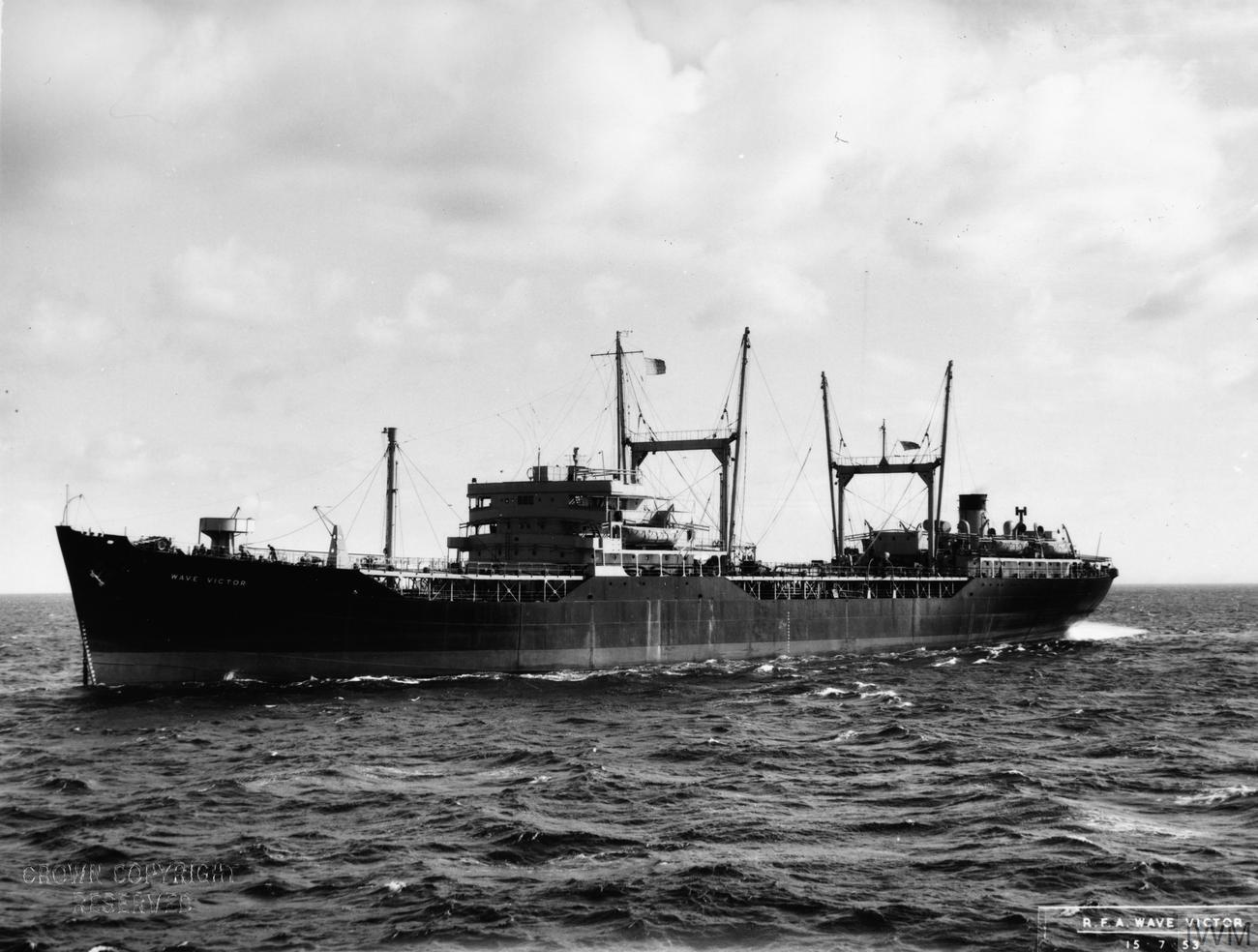
RFA Wave Victor

Empire Bounty was an 8,128 GRT tanker which was built by the Furness Shipbuilding Company, Haverton Hill-on-Tees. Launched on 30 September 1943 and completed in February 1944. To Royal Navy in 1946 as RFA Wave Victor. Fire in the engine room in Bristol Channel, February 1954. The vessel was abandoned but reboarded and towed to Swansea. Towed to North Shields in April 1954 and repaired. Chartered to the Air Ministry in August 1960, sent to Gan, Maldive Islands as a fuelling hulk for military aircraft using RAF Gan. Towed to Singapore in April 1971 for scrapping. Reported to be a hulk in Manila Bay, Philippines in March 1975.

=== Empire Bowman ===
Empire Bowman was a 7,030 GRT cargo ship which was built by C Connell & Co Ltd, Scotstoun, Glasgow. Launched on 4 April 1942 and completed in May 1942. Torpedoed and sunk by U-404 on 30 March 1943 at 47°26′N 15°53′W while a member of Convoy SL 126.

=== Empire Boxer ===
Empire Boxer was a 340 GRT coastal tanker which was built by Rowhedge Ironworks Ltd, Rowhedge. Launched on 14 October 1943 and completed in February 1944. Sold in 1946 to C Rowbotham & Sons and renamed Chartsman. Sold to Coastal Prospecting Ltd and converted to suction dredger in 1967, renamed Baymead. Scrapped at Northam in July 1974.

=== Empire Boy ===
Empire Boy was an 859 GRT coaster which was built by Goole Shipbuilding & Repairing Co Ltd, Goole. Launched on 28 August 1941 and completed in December 1941. Sold in 1942 to the Dutch Government and renamed Doorman. Sold in 1947 to Verenigde Tankkustvaart NV, Netherlands and renamed Flandria. Sold in 1951 to Ulric Thomas and renamed Alice. Operated under the management of S Stein KG, Germany. Sold in 1952 to Bauermann & Metzendorf GmbH, Germany and renamed Hammonia. Lengthened in that year. Sold in 1954 to R Bauermann and renamed Petra. Operated under the management of Olea Tankschiff GmbH, Germany. Sold in 1962 to Vittorio Rossetti, Italy and renamed Anny. New engine in 1965, renamed Tosco in 1972. Sold in 1975 to Tosco Sardi di Navigazione SpA, Italy. Scrapped at Spezia in June 1975.

=== Empire Bracken ===
Empire Bracken was a 263 GRT tug built by Goole Shipbuilding & Repairing Co Ltd, Goole. Launched on 24 September 1941 and completed in April 1942. Sold in 1946 to Clyde Shipping Co Ltd and renamed Flying Spitfire. Sold in 1963 to Societa Salvataggi Siciliana, Italy and renamed Tortoli. Renamed Lindoi in 1968. Scrapped in Cagliari in December 1983.

=== Empire Breeze ===
Empire Breeze was a 7,457 GRT cargo ship which was built by J L Thompson & Sons Ltd, Sunderland. Launched on 3 October 1940 and completed in January 1941. Aground on Bondicar Rocks off Amble, 5 February 1941. Refloated 13 March 1941 and taken in tow by tug Bullger. Tug struck a mine and sank in Druridge Bay on 16 March. Empire Breeze was anchored off Cresswell and later taken to Sunderland for repairs. Empire Breeze was torpedoed on 25 August 1942 and sunk by U-438 at 49°22′N 35°52′W while a member of Convoy ON 122.

=== Empire Brent ===
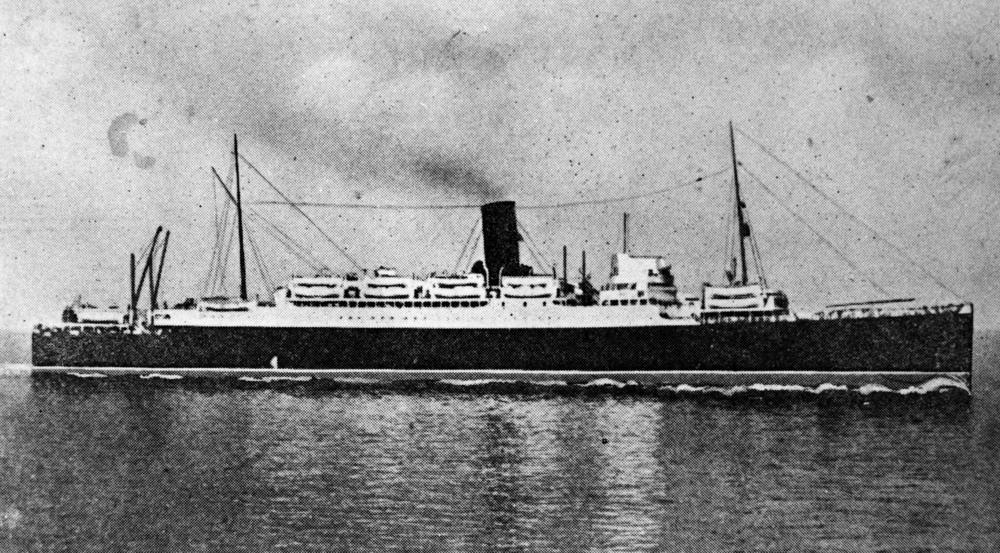
Empire Brent

Empire Brent was a 13,876 GRT liner which was built by Fairfield Shipbuilding & Engineering Co Ltd, Glasgow. Launched in 1925 as Letitia for Anchor Donaldson Line. Converted to troopship in 1940 and then a hospital ship in 1944. To MoWT in 1946 and renamed Empire Brent, operated under the management of Donaldson's. Renamed Captain Cook in 1952, scrapped at Inverkeithing in 1960.

=== Empire Bridge ===
Empire Bridge was a 348 GRT coaster which was built by W. J. Yarwood & Sons Ltd, Northwich. Launched on 26 February 1941 and complete in June 1941. Sale to Springwell Shipping Co agreed in 1946 and new name Springbridge allocated, but involved in attempted salvage of cargo from SS Fort Massac which had been in a collision with SS Thornaby off the Sunk Light Vessel (51°53′N 1°31′E) on 9 April 1946. Empire Bridge was holed in a collision with the wreck of Fort Massac and sank alongside her. Salvage attempts by the Admiralty only succeeded in turning her on her port side. Declared a total constructive loss.

=== Empire Brigade ===
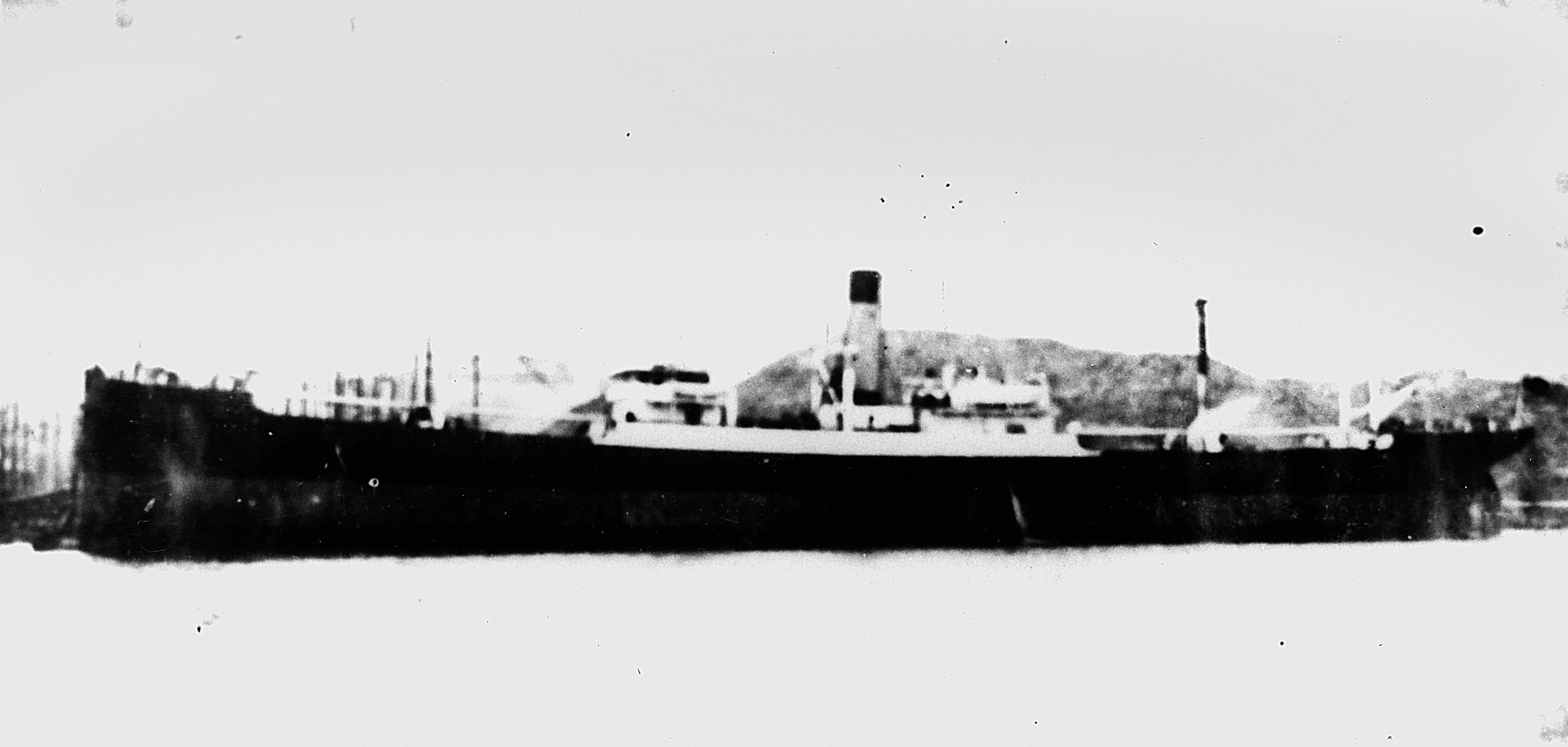
Hannington Court

Empire Brigade was a 5,154 GRT cargo ship which was built by J Priestman & Co Ltd, Sunderland. Launched in 1912 as Hannington Court. Sold in 1936 to Achille Lauro & Co, Naples and renamed Elios. Taken as prize on 10 June 1940 in Newcastle upon Tyne, to MoWT and renamed Empire Brigade. Torpedoed and sunk on 18 October 1940 by U-99 in the North Atlantic (57°12′N 10°43′W).

=== Empire Broadsword ===
Empire Broadsword was a 7,177 GRT infantry landing ship which was built by Consolidated Steel Corporation, Wilmington. She was laid down as Cape Marshall and completed as Empire Broadsword in December 1943. Struck a mine and sank in the English Channel (49°25′N 00°54′W) on 2 July 1944.

=== Empire Bromley ===
Empire Bromley was a 1,059 GRT coaster which was built by George Brown and Co (Marine) Ltd, Greenock. Launched on 26 May 1945 and completed in June 1945. Sold in 1946 to Constantine Shipping Co and renamed Levenwood. Operated under the management of J Constantine Steamship Line Ltd. Sold in 1961 to Panax (Overseas) Ltd, London and renamed Basildon. Sold in 1962 to Don Shipping Co Ltd. Operated under the management of C M Willie & Co (Shipping) Ltd. Sold in 1963 to R S Braggs & Co (Shipping) Ltd. Scrapped in October 1967 at Burcht, Belgium.

=== Empire Bronze ===
Empire Bronze was an 8,149 GRT tanker which was built by R & W Hawthorn, Leslie & Co Ltd, Newcastle upon Tyne. Launched on 19 August 1940 and completed in November 1940. Sold in 1946 to Anglo-American Oil Co Ltd and renamed Esso Cadillac. Sold in 1956 to Mariblanca Navigazione SA, Panama and renamed Maribella II. Operated under the management of Chandris (England) Ltd. Arrived at Osaka for scrapping on 14 August 1959.

=== Empire Brook ===
Empire Brook was a 2,852 GRT coaster which was built by William Gray & Co Ltd, West Hartlepool. Launched on 10 April 1941 and completed in May 1941. Sold in 1946 to Stanhope Steamship Co Ltd and renamed Stancliffe. Operated under the management of J A Billmeir & Co Ltd, London. Grounded on 3 April 1947 at entrance to Sharpness Docks. Back broken, cargo of timber was salvaged. Refloated on 15 June 1947 and beached. Declared a constructive total loss, sold and repaired. Sold to Newbigin Steamship Co Ltd, Newcastle upon Tyne and renamed Gripfast. Operated under the management of E R Newbigin Ltd, Newcastle upon Tyne. Sold in 1960 to Saints Anargyroi Compagnia Ltda, Panama and renamed Capetan Costis. Operated under the management of Ezkos Maritime Technical Co, Greece. Sold in 1966 to Compagnia di Navigazione Patricio, Liberia and renamed Karine M. Operated under the management of Mooringwell Steamship Co, Cardiff. Sold later that year to Siconen Shipping SA, Panama, and renamed Pitsa. Operated under the management of Kalamotusis Shipbroking Ltd, London. Put into Djibouti on 10 October 1967 with boiler defects, also found to be leaking. Left for Colombo on 1 December 1967 in tow of tug Nisos Kerkyra. Sank on 6 December 1967 off Socotra Island (13°32′N 55°00′E).

=== Empire Bruce ===
Empire Bruce was a prototype design 7,459 GRT cargo ship built by Sir James Laing & Sons Ltd, Sunderland. Launched on 11 June 1941 and completed in August 1941. Torpedoed and sunk on 18 April 1943 by U-123 100 nautical miles (190 km) off Freetown, Sierra Leone (06°40′N 13°17′W).

=== Empire Brutus ===
Empire Brutus was a 7,233 GRT cargo ship which was built by J L Thompsons & Sons Ltd, Sunderland. Launched on 18 December 1942 and completed in March 1943. Damaged by bombing on 26 July 1943 at 39°50′N 13°38′W. Damaged by a mine on 8 July 1944 off Normandy. Sold in 1948 to Haddon Steamship Co Ltd, London, and renamed Vergmor. Sold in 1950 to Turnbull, Scott Shipping Co Ltd, London and renamed Southgate. sold in 1955 to Sadikzade Rusen Ogullari KS, Turkey, and renamed Fatih. Scrapped in Istanbul in February 1968.

=== Empire Buckler ===
Empire Buckler was a 7,046 GRT cargo ship which was built by Lithgows Ltd, Port Glasgow. Launched on 30 June 1942 and completed in September 1942. Sold in 1946 to Houlder Bros & Co Ltd and renamed Ovingdean Grange. Sold in 1959 to Devon Shipping Co Ltd, Liberia, and renamed Sabrina. Operated under the management of Empresa Navigacion Proamar SRL, Argentina. Sold in 1961 to Compagnia Navigazione Marcasa SA and renamed Noemi. Operated under the Lebanese flag by J Livanos & Sons Ltd, London. Ran aground on 17 December 1965 south of Masirah, Oman and declared a constructive total loss.

=== Empire Buffalo ===
Empire Buffalo was a 6,374 GRT cargo ship which was built by Skinner & Eddy, Seattle. Launched in 1919 as Eglantine for USSB. To Lykes Bros-Ripley Steamship Corp in 1933. To MoWT in 1940 and renamed Empire Buffalo. Torpedoed and sunk on 6 May 1942 by U-125 northwest of Jamaica (19°14′N 82°34′W).

=== Empire Builder ===
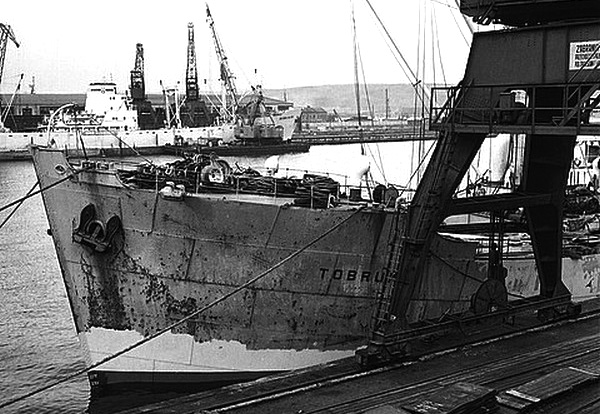
Tobruk

Empire Builder was a 7,048 GRT cargo ship which was built by William Gray & Co Ltd, West Hartlepool. Launched on 19 November 1941. To Polish Government and completed in January 1942 as Tobruk. Operated under the management of Gdynia America Shipping Lines Ltd. Sold in 1951 to Polskie Linie Oceaniczne. Scrapped in Gdynia in June 1968.

=== Empire Bulbul ===
Empire Bulbul was a 576 GRT coaster built by J I Thornycroft & Co Ltd, Southampton. Launched in 1924 as Jamnagar for the Maharaja Jam Sahib of Nawangar, India. To Royal Indian Navy in 1941 as an auxiliary patrol vessel. To Hashim Mohomed Ganchi, India in 1944 then to MoWT, renamed Empire Bulbul. Sold in 1947 to Yannoulatos (Far East) Ltd, Hong Kong and renamed Hellenic Bulbul. New name Hellenic Bee allocated but ran aground on 29 August 1948 near Domanik Island, Bay of Bengal (21°53′N 90°48′E), and then sank.

=== Empire Bunting ===
Empire Bunting was a 6,318 GRT cargo ship which was built by Skinner & Eddy, Seattle. Launched in 1919 as Eelbeck for USSB. To MoWT in 1941 and renamed Empire Bunting. Sunk on 9 June 1944 as a blockship as part of "Gooseberry 4", Juno Beach, Courseulles-sur-Mer. Raised in 1947 and scrapped.

=== Empire Bure ===
Empire Bure was an 8,178 GRT cargo liner which was built by J Cockerill SA, Hoboken, Belgium. Launched in 1921 as Elizabethville for Compagnie Belge-Maritime du Congo. To MoWT during the war and renamed Empire Bure. Operated under the management of Lamport & Holt Line as a troopship. Laid up in September 1949 in Holy Loch. Sold in 1950 to Charlton Steamship Co and renamed Charlton Star. Laid up at Spezia in 1957. Sold in 1958 to A J & D J Chandris, Greece. Reflagged to Liberia and renamed Maristrella. Sold for scrap in 1959 and scrapped in Sakai, Japan in 1960.

=== Empire Burton ===
Empire Burton was a 6,966 GRT CAM ship which was built by Short Brothers Ltd, Sunderland. Launched on 29 May 1941 and completed in August 1941. Torpedoed and sunk on 20 September 1941 by U-74 east of Cape Farewell, Greenland (61°30′N 35°11′W) while a member of Convoy SC 44.

=== Empire Bute ===
Empire Bute was an 813 GRT coastal tanker which was built by A & J Inglis Ltd, Glasgow. Launched on 19 October 1944 and completed in December 1944. Sold in 1946 to the French Government and renamed Miliana. Sold in 1948 to Scotto Pugliese Fils & Cie, Algeria and renamed Rivoli. Sold in 1952 to Bulk Oil Steamship Co Ltd and renamed Pass of Drumochter. Sold in 1962 to Lugari & Filippi, Italy, and renamed Santa Giulia. Sold in 1971 to Ciana Anopo Compagnia di Navigazione & Bunkeraggi SpA, Italy. Scrapped at Spezia, Italy in 1971.

=== Empire Buttress ===
Empire Buttress was a 2,905 GRT cargo ship which was built by William Gray & Co Ltd, West Hartlepool. Launched on 6 May 1943 and completed in July 1943. Sold in 1946 to Burnett Steamship Co Ltd, Newcastle upon Tyne, and renamed Wallsend. Sold in 1959 to Bordagain Shipping Co Ltd, Liberia and renamed Bordagain. Operated under the management of R de la Sota Jr, France. Sold in 1967 to Compagnia de Navigazione Pinares SA, Panama and renamed Daring. Scrapped in Split, Yugoslavia in May 1976.

=== Empire Byng ===
Empire Byng was a 7,832 GRT heavy-lift ship built by Greenock Dockyard Co, Greenock. Launched on 16 November 1944 and completed in May 1945. Sold in 1951 to Dalhousie Steam & Motorshipping Co Ltd and renamed Peter Dal II. Operated under the management of Nomikos (London) Ltd. Sold in 1954 to Novacastria Shipping Co Ltd, still under the management of Nomikos. Sold in 1955 to Ben Line Steamers Ltd and renamed Benwyvis. Sold in 1963 to Bacong Shipping SA, Panama, and renamed Southern Comet. Operated under the management of Southern Industrial Projects Inc, Manila. Sold in 1968 to Peoples Bank & Trust Co, Philippines and renamed Marites. Grounded on 19 November 1970 in Manila Bay during Typhoon Patsy. Refloated 29 November, anchored in South Harbour, Manila. Sold and arrived at Hong Kong on 8 February 1972 for scrapping.

=== Empire Byron ===
Empire Byron was a 6,640 GRT cargo ship which was built by Bartram & Sons Ltd, Sunderland. Launched on 6 October 1941 and completed in January 1942. Damaged on 5 July 1942 by an aerial torpedo dropped by a Heinkel He 111 of KG26, then sunk by a torpedo fired by U-703 in the Barents Sea (76°18′N 33°30′E) while a member of Convoy PQ 17.

== See also ==
The above entries give a precis of each ship's history. For a fuller account see the linked articles.

== bibliography ==
- Mitchell, WH; Sawyer, LA (1990). The Empire Ships (2nd ed.). London, New York, Hamburg, Hong Kong: Lloyd's of London Press Ltd. ISBN 1-85044-275-4.
