= List of Empire ships built in the United States =

A list of Empire ships that were of United States origin. See Lists of Empire ships for references.

4 Ships built prior to the establishment of the United States Shipping Board

- Chicago Shipbuilding Company
  - Empire Newt (built 1903)
- American Shipbuilding Company, Cleveland Ohio
  - Empire Stickleback (built 1895)
- Toledo Shipbuilding Company, Toledo, Ohio
  - Empire Taj
- New York Shipbuilding, Camden, New Jersey
  - Empire Woodlark (built 1913)

93 Ships built for the USSB, approximately between 1917 and 1920. The majority of these ships were of standard designs of 7,500dwt, 8,800dwt, 9,400dwt and 9,600dwt. Plus 4 ships shortly after the USSB reign.

- Skinner & Eddy, Seattle, Washington
  - Empire Buffalo
  - Empire Bunting
  - Empire Cheetah
  - Empire Dunlin
  - Empire Gull(I)
  - Empire Hartebeeste
  - Empire Ibex
  - Empire Leopard
  - Empire Mermaid
  - Empire Pelican
  - Empire Penguin
  - Empire Simba
  - Empire Wildebeeste
- Ames Shipbuilding and Drydock Company, Seattle, Washington
  - Empire Chamois
  - Empire Eagle
  - Empire Gemsbuck
  - Empire Kittiwake (I)
  - Empire Merlin
  - Empire Nightingale
  - Empire Ocelot
  - Empire Springbuck
  - Empire Woodcock
- American International Shipbuilding, Hog Island, Pennsylvania
  - Empire Barracuda
  - Empire Dolphin
  - Empire Falcon
  - Empire Flamingo
  - Empire Hawk
  - Empire Mahseer
  - Empire Ortolan
  - Empire Razorbill
  - Empire Shearwater
  - Empire State, launched as Shaume was not an Empire ship.
- Federal Shipbuilding and Drydock Company, Kearny, New Jersey
  - Empire Kangaroo
  - Empire Kudu
  - Empire Magpie
  - Empire Peacock
  - Empire Redshank
  - Empire Reindeer
  - Empire Thrush
  - Empire Toucan (1920, but not for the USSB)
  - Empire Whale
- Moore Dry Dock Company, Oakland, California
  - Empire Avocet
  - Empire Heron
  - Empire Merganser
  - Empire Plover
  - Empire Raven
  - Empire Starling
  - Empire Whimbrel
- Todd Dry Dock and Construction Company, Tacoma, Washington
  - Empire Antelope
  - Empire Elk
  - Empire Gazelle
  - Empire Mallard
  - Empire Tiger
  - Empire Wagtail
- Columbia River Shipbuilding, Portland, Oregon
  - Empire Miniver
  - Empire Moorhen
  - Empire Oryx, later Empire Robin
  - Empire Panther
  - Empire Turnstone
- Northwest Steel, Portland, Oregon
  - Empire Cormorant
  - Empire Cougar
  - Empire Grebe (I)
  - Empire Mavis
  - Empire Opossum
- G. M. Standifer Construction, Vancouver, Washington
  - Empire Kingfisher
  - Empire Ptarmigan
  - Empire Sambar, later Empire Beaver
- Merchant Shipbuilding Corporation, Chester, Pennsylvania
  - Empire Kite, later Empire Seal (1922, not for USSB)
  - Empire Lapwing (Bristol yard)
  - Empire Swan (1922, not for USSB, sister ship of Kite, both early motor ship designs)
- Southwestern Shipbuilding, San Pedro, California
  - Empire Bison
  - Empire Hawksbill
- Atlantic Corporation, Portsmouth, New Hampshire
  - Empire Dabchick
  - Empire Dorado
- J. F. Duthie & Company, Seattle, Washington
  - Empire Adur (1920, not for the USSB)
  - Empire Gannet (I)
- Virginia Shipbuilding Corporation, Alexandria Virginia
  - Empire Impala
  - Empire Moose
- Pusey & Jones, Gloucester, New Jersey
  - Empire Puma
  - Empire Steelhead
- various others (1 ship per yard)
  - Empire Bascobel (tug)
  - Empire Caribou
  - Empire Albatross
  - Empire Crossbill
  - Empire Egret
  - Empire Eland
  - Empire Guillemot (I)
  - Empire Hamble
  - Empire Kestrel
  - Empire Lynx
  - Empire Mouflon
  - Empire Otter
  - Empire Porpoise
  - Empire Prize
  - Empire Snipe
  - Empire Tarpon
  - Empire Tern (I)
  - Empire Waterhen

21 Ships built for the United States Maritime Commission, approximately after 1939

- Consolidated Steel Corporation, Wilmington, California (C1-S-AY1)
  - Empire Anvil
  - Empire Arquebus
  - Empire Battleaxe
  - Empire Broadsword
  - Empire Crossbow
  - Empire Cutlass
  - Empire Gauntlet
  - Empire Halberd
  - Empire Javelin
  - Empire Lance
  - Empire Mace
  - Empire Rapier
  - Empire Spearhead
- Federal Shipbuilding and Drydock Company, Kearny, New Jersey
  - Empire Condor (I)
  - Empire Fulmar (I)
  - Empire Pintail
- Sun Shipbuilding and Drydock Company, Chester, Pennsylvania
  - Empire Lagan
  - Empire Peregrine
- Bethlehem Fore River Shipyard, Quincy, Massachusetts
  - Empire Widgeon
- Bath Iron Works, Bath, Maine
  - Empire Oriole
- Bethlehem Sparrows Point, Sparrows Point, Maryland
  - Empire Curlew (I)
