= Tortoli =

Tortoli may refer to:

- Tortolì, a place in Sardinia
- ST Tortoli, a tug 1963–1968, formerly Empire Bracken
