= MV Brendonia =

A number of motor vessels have been named Brendonia, including:

- MV Brendonia (1937), a British coaster in service 1937–39
- MV Brendonia (1941), a British coaster in service 1945–64
