= List of Empire ships (K) =

List of a category of U.K. transport ships used during WW2

== Suffix beginning with K ==
=== Empire Kamal ===
Empire Kamal was a 7,862 GRT cargo ship which was built by Bremer Vulkan Schiff- und Maschinenbau, Vegesack. Launched in 1938 as Hohenfels for DDG Hansa, Bremen. Scuttled on 25 August 1941 at Bandar Shapur, Iran. Raised and seized as a war prize. To MoWT and renamed Empire Kamal. Allocated in 1944 to the Dutch Government and renamed Van Ruisdael. Sold in 1947 to Vereenigde Nederland Scheepsvaart and renamed Ridderkerk. Scrapped in September 1962 at Hong Kong.

=== Empire Kangaroo ===
Empire Kangaroo was a 6,219 GRT (9,600 DWT) cargo ship which was built by Federal Shipbuilding Co, Kearny, New Jersey. Completed in January 1919 as Mercer for the United States Shipping Board (USSB). To MoWT in 1940 and renamed Empire Kangaroo. Sold in 1946 to Donaldson Brothers, Glasgow and renamed Parthenia. Sold in 1949 to P Mazzella, Naples and renamed Erminia Mazzella. Sold in 1951 to A Onorato, Naples and renamed Pina Onorato. Scrapped in August 1958 in Spezia, Italy.

=== Empire Katy ===
Empire Katy was a 258 GRT tug which was built by Goole Shipbuilding & Repairing Co Ltd, Goole. Launched on 18 December 1944 and completed in June 1945. Sold in 1948 to Aden Port Trust, Aden and renamed Sir Bernard Reilly. Sold in 1963 to Societa di Navigazion Rim. Capiechi, Italy and renamed Mar Siculo. Scrapped in 1979 at Milazzo, Italy.

=== Empire Keats ===
Empire Keats was a 7,035 GRT cargo ship which was built by Short Brothers Ltd, Sunderland. Launched on 19 March 1942 and completed in May 1942. Allocated in 1943 to the Greek Government and renamed Ionion. Sold in 1947 to E & J Chandris, Greece and renamed Ioannis Chandris. Sold in 1955 to Navigation de Samos and renamed Ioannis Inglessis. Operated under the management of D Inglessi Fils SA, Greece. Sold in 1965 to Welfare Marine Corporation, Liberia and renamed Thai Long. Operated under the management of Tai Chong Navigation Co Ltd, Hong Kong. Scrapped in October 1966 at Keelung, Taiwan.

=== Empire Kedah ===
Empire Kedah was a 7,311 GRT cargo ship which was built by Shipbuilding Corporation Ltd, Sunderland. Launched on 6 November 1945 as Empire Kedah and completed in April 1946 for Kaye, Son & Co Ltd, London. Sold in 1962 to Cerra Umumi, Turkey and renamed M Nurfan. Arrived on 25 September 1969 at Istanbul for scrapping.

=== Empire Keith ===
Empire Keith was to have been a 235 GRT tug built by A Hall & Co, Aberdeen. The contract to build her was cancelled when she was under construction and she was scrapped on the stocks. Her engine was installed in the tug Serviceman which had suffered a boiler explosion.

=== Empire Ken ===
Empire Ken was a 9,523 GRT passenger ship which was built by Blohm & Voss, Hamburg. Launched in 1928 as Ubena for Deutsche Ost-Afrika Linie. Requisitioned in 1939 by the Kriegsmarine, used as depot ship for the 3rd, 5th and 21st U-boat Flotillas. Converted in 1945 to hospital ship, participated in the evacuation of Germans from the Baltics. Seized in May 1945 at Travemünde. To MoWT and renamed Empire Ken. Conversion to troop ship completed in December 1945. In collision with HMT Empire Medway in Valletta Harbour, Malta in 1951. Involved in the Suez Canal landings in 1956. In September 1957 scrapping commenced at Dalmuir, Dunbartonshire. Hulk arrived on 16 December 1957 at Troon, Ayrshire for final demolition.

=== Empire Kennet ===
Empire Kennet was a 2,319 GRT cargo ship which was built by Deutsche Werft, Hamburg. Launched in 1925 as Las Palmas for Oldenburg Portuguese Line. Seized in May 1945 at Flensburg. To MoWT and renamed Empire Kennet. Allocated in 1946 to USSR and renamed Brest. Later converted to a factory ship and stationed at Vladivostok, her name was removed from shipping registers in 1955 and she was scrapped in 1971.

=== Empire Kent ===
Empire Kent was a 4,769 GRT cargo ship which was built by Nordseewerke, Emden. Launched in 1939 as Levante for Deutsche Levante Linie, Hamburg. Seized in May 1945 at Oslo. To MoWT and renamed Empire Kent. Sold in 1947 to Johnson Warren Lines Ltd and renamed Oakmore. Scrapped in April 1967 at Avilés, Spain.

=== Empire Kestrel ===
Empire Kestrel was a 2,674 GRT (5,050 DWT) cargo ship which was built by Great Lakes Engineering Works, Ecorse, Michigan. Completed in 1919 as Lake Ellithorpe for the USSB. To Newtex Steamship Corp, New York in 1926. Renamed Texas Trader in 1932. To MoWT in 1940 and renamed Empire Kestrel. Attacked on 16 August 1943 by German aircraft and sunk by an aerial torpedo at 37°10′N 04°35′E.

=== Empire Kew ===
Empire Kew was a 1,052 GRT cargo ship which was built by John Lewis & Sons Ltd, Aberdeen. Launched on 29 March 1945 and completed in May 1945. Sold in 1947 to Constants (South Wales) Ltd and renamed Beltinge. Sold in 1950 to Ald Shipping Co Ltd and renamed Monkton Coombe. Operated under the management of A L Duggan & Co, Bristol. Sold in 1958 to Ligure Fiorentina di Naviagzione and renamed Astarte. Operated under the management of Danio Navigazione SRL, Italy. New diesel engine fitted in 1959. Sold in 1964 to Ditta Giuseppi Dormio, Italy and renamed Maria Dormio. Rebuilt to 1,783 GRT. Sold in 1975 to Ant. Scotto di Santolo, Italy. On 3 February 1978, she sprang a leak in bad weather and was abandoned. She sank in the Tyrrhenian Sea 56 nautical miles (104 km) southwest of Cape Miseno.

=== Empire Kingfisher ===
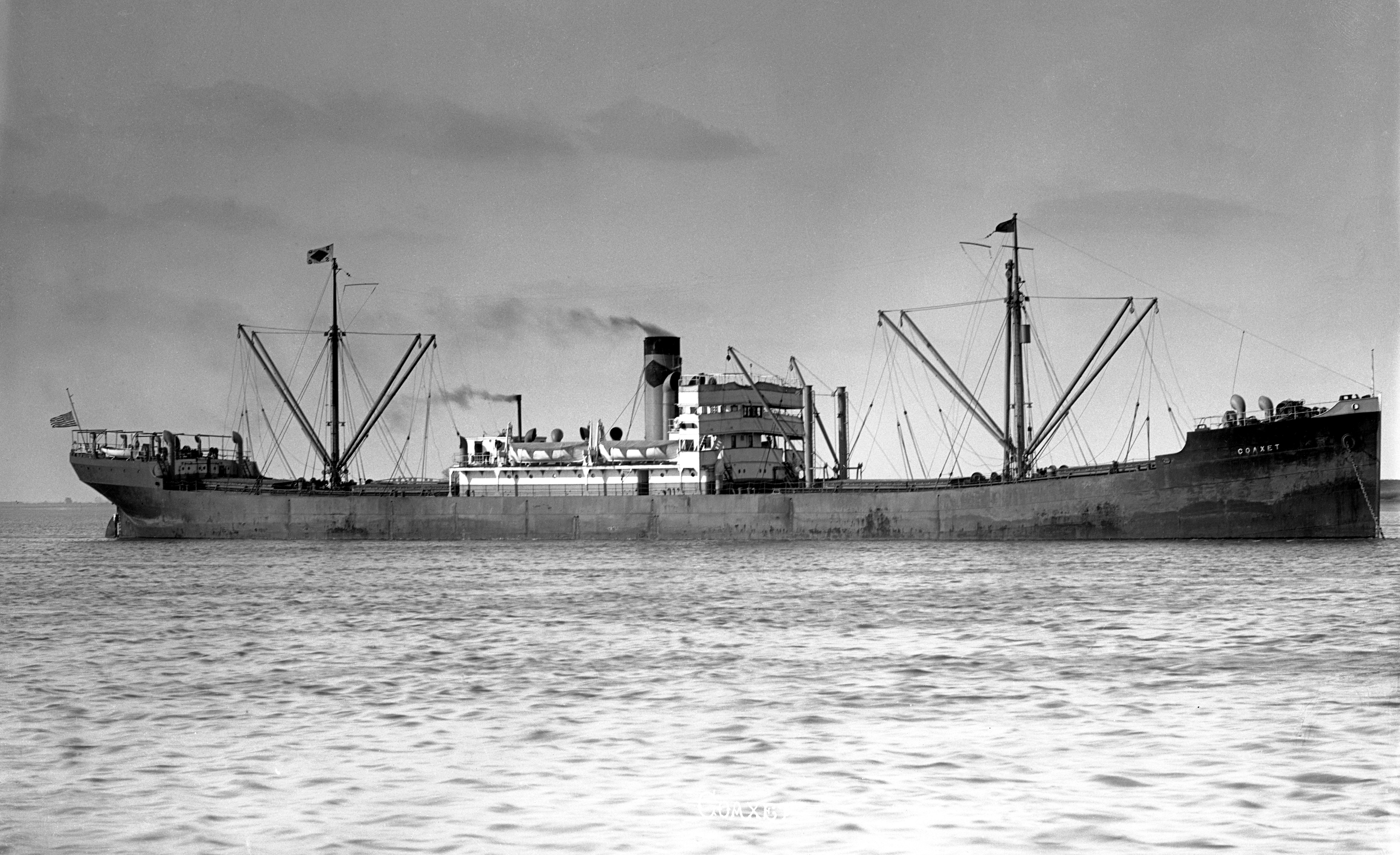
Coaxet in Black Diamond SS Co colours

Empire Kingfisher was a 6,038 GRT cargo ship that was built by the G. M. Standifer Construction Company, Vancouver, Washington. Completed in 1919 as Coaxet for the USSB. To MoWT in 1941 and renamed Empire Kingfisher. On 18 January 1942 she struck a submerged object 4 nautical miles (7.4 km) off Cape Sable Island, Nova Scotia and was holed. She was anchored and abandoned, and sank on 19 January 1942 before salvage tugs could reach her. The German U-boat U-109 has long been credited with the sinking, as Empire Kingfisher believed she was torpedoed rather than had struck a rock. A U-boat attack distress signal was sent out, and as the U-109 was attacking and launching several torpedoes on a ship nearby, the Germans also believed one of the stray torpedoes had hit Empire Kingfisher.

=== Empire Kingsley ===
Empire Kingsley was a 6,996 GRT cargo ship which was built by Greenock Dockyard Co Ltd, Greenock. Launched on 19 September 1941 and completed in December 1941. Torpedoed on 22 March 1945 and sunk by U-315 at 50°08′N 05°51′W.

=== Empire Kingsway ===
Empire Kingsway was a 1,051 GRT coaster which was built by George Brown & Co (Marine) Ltd, Greenock. Launched on 27 July 1945 as Empire Kingsway and completed in 1946 as The Emperor for J Hay & Sons Ltd, Glasgow. Scrapped in 1963 at Boom, Belgium.

=== Empire Kinsman ===
Empire Kinsman was a 6,640 GRT cargo ship which was built by Bartram & Sons Ltd, Sunderland. Launched on 29 August 1942 and completed in December 1942. Damaged on 6 March 1943 by enemy bombing at Murmansk, USSR but later repaired. Sold in 1948 to Bullard, King & Co and renamed Umzinto. Sold in 1956 to Compagnia Ltda Filia, Costa Rica and renamed Vastric. Arrived on 30 August 1966 at Onomichi, Japan for scrapping.

=== Empire Kitchener ===
Empire Kitchener was a 9,881 GRT cargo liner which was built by Caledon Shipbuilding & Engineering Co Ltd, Dundee. Launched on 18 August 1944 and completed in December 1944. Sold in 1946 to Canadian Pacific Steamship Co Ltd and renamed Beaverford. Sold in 1963 to Alliance Marine Corporation, Panama and renamed Hulda. Operated under the management of P S Li, Hong Kong. Sold in 1966 to International Marine Corporation, Liberia. Operated under the management of Y C Cheung, New York. On 18 August 1969 she broke her moorings during Hurricane Camille and came aground at Gulfport, Mississippi. Declared a constructive total loss and scrapped in situ.

=== Empire Kite ===
Empire Kite was a 7,965 GRT cargo ship which was built by the Merchant Shipbuilding Corporation, Chester, Pennsylvania. Completed in May 1922 as Californian for American-Hawaiian Steamship Co. To MoWT in 1940 and renamed Empire Kite then Empire Seal later that year. Torpedoed on 19 February 1942 and sunk by U-96 at 43°14′N 64°45′W.

=== Empire Kittiwake (I) ===
Empire Kittiwake was a 5,674 GRT cargo ship which was built by the Ames Shipbuilding and Drydock Company, Seattle. Ordered as War Hector for the British Shipping Controller, London. Completed in January 1919 as Western Ally for the USSB. To McCormick Steamship Co, San Francisco in 1927. To MoWT in 1940 and renamed Empire Kittiwake. Allocated to the Greek Government in 1942 and renamed Epiros. Sold in 1948 to Zaunos, Stavrides & Cocolis, Greece. Sold in 1951 to Transworld Lines SA, Panama and renamed San Andrea. Scrapped in January 1953 at Stockton on Tees, Co. Durham.

=== Empire Kittiwake (II) ===
Empire Kittiwake was a 4,820 GRT LST (3) which was built by Davie Shipbuilding and Repairing Co Ltd, Lauzon, Quebec. Launched in July 1945 as HMS LST 3510 and later renamed HMS Slinger. Laid up in the River Clyde but requisitioned in 1956 by the Ministry of Transport during the Suez Crisis. Scrapped in January 1969 at Singapore.

=== Empire Knight ===
Empire Knight was a 7,244 GRT cargo ship which was built by William Doxford & Sons Ltd, Sunderland. Launched on 15 January 1942 and completed in April 1942. On 11 February 1944 she ran aground in a blizzard at Boon Island Ledge, 12 nautical miles (22 km) from York, Maine (43°08′N 70°24′W). She was abandoned the next day and broke in two, with the stern section sinking. The bow section sank on 15 February 1944.

=== Empire Knoll ===
Empire Knoll was a 2,824 GRT collier which was built by William Gray & Co Ltd, West Harlepool. Launched on 16 December 1940 and completed in February 1941. On 17 February 1941, she came ashore in a gale and struck the foundations of the North Pier, Tynemouth, broke in two and declared a total loss.

=== Empire Kohinoor ===
Empire Kohinoor was a 5,225 GRT cargo ship which was built by W Hamilton & Co Ltd, Port Glasgow. Launched in 1919 as War Celt. Sold in 1919 to Lloyd Triestino, Trieste, Italy and renamed Caboto. Scuttled on 25 August 1941 at Bandar Shapur, Iran. Refloated and seized by the British as a war prize. To MoWT and renamed Empire Kohinoor. Torpedoed on 2 July 1943 and damaged by U-618 at 06°20′N 16°30′W. She was torpedoed again by U-618 the next day and sunk.

=== Empire Kudu ===
Empire Kudu was a 6,262 GRT cargo ship which was built by the Federal Shipbuilding and Drydock Company, Kearney, New Jersey. Completed in March 1919 as Duquesne for the USSB. To Lykes Brothers-Ripley Steamship Co Inc in 1933. To MoWT in 1941 and renamed Empire Kudu. On 26 September 1941 she came ashore 6 nautical miles (11 km) west of Point Amour, Belle Isle Strait and was declared a total loss. Henry Carter (26/05/1924-15/02/2014) WWII Merchant Navy, wrote in his autobiography 'My Life During WWII & in Times of Peace' (2017) "I joined the Empire Kudu on 4/6/1941 as a cabin boy. We ran aground off the Labrador coast – in northeastern Canada, on 26 September 1941. We got into the lifeboats and then were told to get back onboard the ship. We found the engine room was half full of water so we got off very quickly again. She didn't sink because she must have been sitting on the bottom. The foggy weather saved our lives because the submarines were waiting for the convoy to sail into the Atlantic Ocean when it came out of the straight, off the Labrador Coast. We did not panic when the ship ran aground because we could not see where we were going. In peace-time, we would have sailed from the convoy area via the Atlantic Ocean but we went the other way to dodge the submarines, but they were waiting for us to come out anyway" (Carter, pp. 28–29).

=== Empire Kumari ===
Empire Kumari was a 6,288 GRT cargo ship which was built by AG Weser, Bremen. Launched in 1920 as Sturmfels for DDG Hansa, Bremen. Scuttled on 25 August 194 at Bandar Shapur, Iran. Refloated and seized by the British as a war prize. To MoWT and renamed Empire Kumari. Torpedoed on 26 August 1942 by U-375 and damaged at 31°58′N 34°21′E. Towed to Haifa Bay, Mandatory Palestine and beached but subsequently sank. On 14 December 1951, the Turkish cargo ship SS Gucum Erman grounded on the wreck of Empire Kumari and sank.

=== Empire Kumasi ===
Empire Kumasi was a 7,021 GRT cargo ship which was built by William Hamilton & Co Ltd, Port Glasgow. Launched on 30 October 1944 and completed in December 1944. Sold in 1947 to Stag Line Ltd, North Shields and renamed Ixia. Operated under the management of J Robinson & Sons. Sold in 1951 to Century Shipping Corp., Liberia and renamed Empire Trader. Operated under the management of Southern Shipping Co Inc, New York. Sold in 1954 to Compangia Atlantica Pacifica SA and renamed North River. Operated under the management of Tidewater Commercial Co Inc., Baltimore. Arrived on 31 January 1960 at Savona, Italy for scrapping but later scrapped at Spezia.

=== Empire Kyle ===
Empire Kyle was a 325 GRT (320 DWT) coaster which was built by I Pimblott & Sons Ltd, Northwich. Launched in 1941 and completed in June 1941. A new diesel engine was fitted in 1945. Sold in 1946 to Erskine Shipping Co Ltd, Liverpool and renamed Turgail. Sold in 1956 to London & Rochester Trading Co and renamed Ordinence. Scrapped in July 1972 at Queenborough, Kent.

== See also ==
The above entries give a précis of each ship's history. For a fuller account see the linked articles.

== Sources ==
- Hirschfeld, Wolfgang (1991). FeindFahrten. Das Logbuch eines U-Bootfunkers. ISBN 3-7043-3097-3.
- Mitchell, WH; Sawyer, LA (1990). The Empire Ships (Second ed.). London, New York, Hamburg, Hong Kong: Lloyd's of London Press Ltd. ISBN 1-85044-275-4.
