= SS Empire Beatrice =

British WWII cargo ship

History
- Name: Empire Beatrice (1942-46); Beatrice N (1946-52); Mary K (1952-64); Winchester Prowess (1964-66); Grazia Bottigliere (1966-69)
- Owner: Ministry of War Transport (1942-46); Cheriton Shipping Co Lte (1946-52); N G Kyrakides Shipping Ltd (1952-64); Winchester Shipping Co Ltd (1964-66); B Bottigliere di Giuseppe (1966-69)
- Operator: David Alexander & Sons (1942-46); P B Pandelis Ltd (1946-52); N G Kyrikades Shipping Ltd (1952-64); G O Till (1964-66); B Bottigliere di Giuseppe (1966-69)
- Port of registry: Greenock, United Kingdom (1942-46); United Kingdom (1946-52); (United Kingdom) London (1952-66); (Italy) Naples (1966-69)
- Builder: Lithgows Ltd, Port Glasgow
- Launched: 23 February 1942
- Completed: April 1942
- Identification: UK Official Number 168994; Code Letters BFDN (1942-46)
- Fate: Scrapped 1966

General characteristics
- Tonnage: 7,046 GRT; 4,286 NRT; 10,750 DWT
- Length: 432 ft 7 in (131.85 m)
- Beam: 56 ft 2 in (17.12 m)
- Depth: 34 ft 2 in (10.41 m)
- Propulsion: One triple expansion steam engine
- Speed: 10 knots (19 km/h)

Empire Beatrice was a 7,046 GRT cargo ship which was built by Lithgows Ltd, Port Glasgow in 1942. She was owned by the Ministry of War Transport (MoWT) and managed by David Alexander & Sons. Although badly damaged during the war, she was repaired and sold into merchant service after the war ended. She served with various shipping companies as Beatrice N, Mary K, Winchester Prowess and Grazia Bottigliere, eventually being scrapped in 1966.

== Description ==
Empire Beatrice was built for the MoWT by Lithgows Ltd, Port Glasgow. She was yard number 978. The ship was launched on 23 February 1942 and completed in April that year. She had a GRT of 7,046, NRT of 4,286 and a DWT of 10,750.

Empire Beatrice was propelled by a triple expansion steam engine which had cylinders of 24½ inches (62 cm), 39 inches (99 cm) and 70 inches (180 cm) diameter and 48 inches (120 cm) stroke. It was built by J G Kincaird Ltd, Greenock and developed 510 horsepower (380 kW). The ship was capable of 10 knots (19 km/h).

== Wartime career ==
After completion, Empire Beatrice was placed under the management of David Alexander & Sons. Her port of registry was Greenock. Empire Beatrice was a member of a number of convoys during the Second World War

KMS 14

Convoy KMS 14, sailed from Liverpool on 5 May 1943 and arrived at Gibraltar on 17 May. Empire Beatrice had commenced her voyage in the Clyde and was bound for Algiers, carrying a cargo which was to form part of a boom defence.

MKS 20

Convoy MKS 20 sailed from Gibraltar on 31 July 1943 and arrived at Liverpool on 10 August. Empire Beatrice was carrying a cargo of phosphates and was bound for London.

MKS 50

Convoy MKS 50 departed Alexandria on 20 May 1944 bound for the United Kingdom. Empire Beatrice joined the convoy at Oran.

On 27 July 1944, Empire Beatrice was torpedoed in the Strait of Dover (50°55′N 01°02′E) by German E-boats. She was beached at Dungeness where temporary repairs were made to make her fit enough for the forward section of the ship to be towed by the tugs Empire Betsy and Empire Humphrey to Tilbury, from where she was later towed to Glasgow for permanent repairs including a new stern.

On 23 April 1945, Empire Beatrice was being towed by tugs Empire Larch and Thames off Aberdeen when she was attacked by U-2326. HMT Macbeth sailed southwards from Aberdeen to escort the towing ships. This was the voyage that returned Empire Beatrice to the Clyde for repairs.

Following the provision of the new stern, the ship was fitted with a triple expansion steam engine which had cylinders of 23½ inches (60 cm), 37½ inches (95 cm) and 68 inches (170 cm) by 48 inches (120 cm) stroke. It was built by John Brown & Co Ltd, Clydebank.

Those lost whilst serving on Empire Beatrice during the war are commemorated at the Tower Hill Memorial, London.

== Postwar career ==
In 1946, Empire Beatrice was sold to Cheriton Shipping Co Ltd and renamed Beatrice N. She was placed under the management of P B Pandelis Ltd, London. In 1952 she was sold to N G Kyrikades Shipping Ltd and renamed Mary K. In 1964, she was sold to Winchester Shipping Co Ltd and renamed Winchester Princess, operated under the management of G O Till, London. In 1966, she was sold to B Bottigliere di Giuseppe, Naples and renamed Grazia Bottigliere. She was scrapped at Split, Yugoslavia, in March 1966. A 50-foot (15 m) section of the original stern can be found in 13 feet (4 m) of water off Dungeness.

== Official Numbers and Code Letters ==
Official numbers were a forerunner to IMO Numbers. Empire Beatrice had the UK Official Number 168994 and used the Code Letters BFDN. Her wireless call sign was MAIS
