= SS Empire Balham =

World War II merchant ship of the United Kingdom

History
- Name: Empire Balham (1944-46); Nordic Queen (1946-58); Maldive Star (1958-72)
- Owner: Ministry of War Transport (1944-46); Queenship Navigation Ltd, London (1946-58); Maldavian National Trading Corp (Ceylon) Ltd (1958-67)
- Operator: British Channel Islands Shipping Co Ltd (1945-46); Coast Lines Ltd (1946-58); Maldavian National Trading Corp (Ceylon) Ltd (1958-72)
- Port of registry: (United Kingdom) Greenock (1945-46); (United Kingdom) London (1946-58); (Dominion of Ceylon) Ceylon (1958-72)
- Builder: G Brown & Co (Marine) Ltd, Greenock
- Yard number: 232
- Launched: 18 December 1944
- Completed: May 1945
- Identification: Official Number 169522 (1945-58); Code Letters GDTL (1945-46)

General characteristics
- Tonnage: 1,061 GRT
- Length: 204 ft 8 in (62.38 m)
- Beam: 32 ft 8 in (9.96 m)
- Depth: 13 ft 7 in (4.14 m)
- Propulsion: 1 x triple expansion steam engine (Ramkin & Blackmore Ltd, Greenock)

Empire Balham was a 1,061 ton cargo ship which was built by G Brown & Co (Marine) Ltd, Greenock in 1944 for the Ministry of War Transport (MoWT). She was sold to Queenship Navigation Ltd in 1946 and renamed Nordic Queen. In 1958 she was sold to the Maldavian National Shipping Corp (Ceylon) Ltd and renamed Maldive Star, serving for a further fourteen years until scrapped in 1967.

== History ==
Empire Balham was built by G Brown & Co (Marine) Ltd, Greenock as yard number 232. She was launched on 18 November 1944 and completed in December 1944. She was initially operated under the management of British Channel Islands Shipping Co Ltd.

=== War service ===
Empire Balham was a member of a number of convoys during the Second World War

COC 173

Convoy COC 173 sailed from Falmouth, on 22 May 1945 and arrived at Granville, Manche on 23 May.

=== Postwar ===
In 1946, Empire Balham was sold to Queenship Navigation Ltd, London and renamed Nordic Queen. In 1958, Nordic Queen was sold to the Maldavian National Shipping Corp (Ceylon) Ltd, and renamed Maldive Star. In June 1959, Ceylon sent a shipment of arms to the Maldives. Ibrahim Nasir led an expedition of hundreds of armed men aboard the Maldive Star to the Fua Mulaku and Huvadhu Atolls during the Suvadive Rebellion of 1963. Maldive Star served with Maldavian National for fourteen years. Maldive Star was scrapped in December 1972 at Gadani Beach, Karachi, Pakistan.

== Official number and code letters ==
Official Numbers were a forerunner to IMO Numbers.

Empire Balham and Nordic Queen had the UK Official Number 169522. Empire Balham used the Code Letters GDTL.
