= SS Stanbell =

History
- Name: Empire Beresford (1943-45); Stanbell (1945-60); Kelantan (1960-65)
- Owner: Ministry of War Transport (1943-45); Stanhope Steamship Co Ltd (1945-60); Malaya Shipping Co, Hong Kong (1960-65)
- Operator: J A Billmeir & Co Ltd (Stanhope Steamship Co Ltd) (1943-60); United Shipping & Investment Co Ltd, Hong Kong (1960- ); Gibson Shipping Co Inc, Macao. ( -1965)
- Port of registry: (United Kingdom) Sunderland (1943-60); (United Kingdom) Hong Kong (1960-65)
- Builder: Sir J Laing & Sons, Sunderland.
- Launched: 15 September 1943
- Identification: UK Official Number 180052; Code Letters GFMY (1943-45)
- Fate: Scrapped

General characteristics
- Tonnage: 9,805 GRT, 5,793 NRT (1943-55); 10,341 GRT, 5,623 NRT, 14,810 DWT (1955-65)
- Length: 484 ft (147.52 m)
- Beam: 68 ft 3 in (20.80 m)
- Depth: 36 ft 1 in (11.00 m)
- Propulsion: One triple expansion steam engine. 674 hp (503 kW)

Stanbell was a 9,804 GRT tanker which was built by Sir J Laing & Sons, Sunderland in 1943 as Empire Beresford for the Ministry of War Transport. Postwar she was sold into merchant service and renamed Stanbell. She was converted to a bulk carrier and later sold to new owners and renamed Kelantan, serving until scrapped in 1965.

== Description ==
Empire Beresford was built by Sir J Laing & Sons, Sunderland. She was yard number 753 and was launched on 15 September 1943 with completion in December. She was 484 feet (147.52 m) long, with a beam of 68 feet 3 inches (20.80 m) and a depth of 36 feet 1 inch (11.00 m). Her GRT was 9,804, with a NRT of 5,793.

== Career ==
Empire Beresford was placed under the management of J A Billmeir & Co Ltd, who traded as the Stanhope Steamship Co Ltd. Her port of registry was Sunderland. Empire Beresford was a member of a number of convoys during the Second World War.

HX 313

Convoy HX 313 departed New York on 10 October 1944 and arrived at Liverpool on 24 October. Empire Beresford was listed as a member of this convoy but did not sail in it, she joined the following convoy, HX 314.

HX 314

Convoy HX 314 departed New York on 15 October 1944 and arrived at Liverpool on 29 October. Empire Beresford was bound for Killingholme.

In 1945, Billmeir's purchased Empire Beresford from the MoWT and renamed her Stanbell. On 13 December 1953, Stanbell was in collision with SS Marine Courier off Cape Henry, Virginia. The master of Marine Courier was found to have been at fault and his licence was suspended for a month.

In 1955, Stanbell was converted to a bulk carrier. She was now 10,341 GRT, 5,623 NRT and 14,810 DWT. In 1960, Stanbell was sold to the Malaya Shipping Co Ltd, Hong Kong and renamed Kelantan. She was initially placed under the management of United Shipping & Investment Co Ltd, Hong Kong but management was later transferred to Gibson Shipping Co Inc, Macao. Kelantan was scrapped in March 1965 at Hirao, Japan.

== Official Numbers and Code Letters ==
Official Numbers were a forerunner to IMO Numbers. Empire Beresford had the UK Official Number 180053 and the Code Letters GFMY.

== Propulsion ==
The ship was propelled by a triple expansion steam engine which had cylinders of 27 inches (69 cm), 44 inches (110 cm) and 76 inches (190 cm) bore by 51 inches (130 cm) stroke. It was built by North East Marine Engineering Co Ltd, Newcastle upon Tyne.
