= HMIS Jamnagar =

1924 coaster of the Royal Indian Navy

History
- Name: Jamnagar (1924–44); Empire Bulbul (1944–47); Hellenic Bulbul (1947–48)
- Owner: The Maharaja Jam Sahib of Nawanagar (1924–40); Hashim Mohomed Ganchi (1940–41); Royal Indian Navy (1941–44); Hashim Mohomed Ganchi (1944); Ministry of War Transport (1944–47); Yannoulatos (Far East) Ltd, Hong Kong (1947–48)
- Operator: Merchant Marine Dept, Nawanagar State (1924–40); Hashim Mohomed Ganchi (1940–41); Royal Indian Navy (1941–44); Hashim Mohomed Ganchi (1944); Ministry of War Transport (1944–47); British India Steam Navigation Co Ltd (1947–48)
- Port of registry: British India (1924–39); (British Raj) Karachi (1939–41); (British Raj) Royal Indian Navy (1941–44); (United Kingdom) London (1944–47); (British Hong Kong) Hong Kong (1947–48)
- Builder: J I Thornycroft & Co Ltd, Woolston
- Yard number: 1030
- Launched: 2 September 1924
- Completed: October 1924
- Out of service: 29 August 1948
- Identification: Code Letters MNLX (1924–41); UK Official Number 147002 (1944–48); Code Letters MNLS (1944–47)
- Fate: Sank

General characteristics
- Tonnage: 576 GRT; 279 NRT
- Length: 160 ft 9 in (49.00 m)
- Beam: 26 ft 1 in (7.95 m)
- Depth: 11 ft 7 in (3.53 m)
- Propulsion: 1 × triple expansion steam engine

Location of the sinking of Hellenic Bulbul off Bangladesh.

Jamnagar was a 576 GRT coaster which was built in 1924 for Maharaja Jam Sahib of Nawanagar. In 1941 she entered service with the Royal Indian Navy. In 1944, she was sold into merchant service before being requisitioned by the Ministry of War Transport (MoWT) and renamed Empire Bulbul. In 1947, she was sold into merchant service and renamed Hellenic Bulbul. The name Hellenic Bee had been allocated but she ran aground and sank before the proposed name change could be implemented.

== Description ==
Jamnagar was built by J I Thornycroft & Co Ltd, Woolston. She was yard number 1030. Jamnagar was launched on 2 September 1924 and completed in October 1924.

The ship was 160 feet 9 inches (49.00 m) long, with a beam of 26 feet 1 inch (7.95 m) and a depth of 11 feet 7 inches (3.53 m). She was propelled by a triple expansion steam engine which had cylinders of 13½ inches (62 cm)13.5 inches (34 cm), 22 inches (56 cm) and 35 inches (89 cm) bore by 27 inches (69 cm) stroke. The engine was built by Thornycroft. She had a GRT of 567 and a NRT of 279.

== Career ==
Jamnagar was operated by the Mercantile Marine Department of the State of Nawanagar. In 1940, she was sold to Hashim Mohomed Ganchi, India. Her port of registry was Karachi. In 1940, Jamnagar was requisitioned by the Royal Indian Navy for use as an auxiliary patrol vessel. She was returned to Ganchi in 1944 and then requisitioned by the MoWT and renamed Empire Bulbul. In 1947, she was sold to Yannoulatos (Far East) Ltd, Hong Kong and renamed Hellenic Bulbul. She was operated under the management of the British Indian Steam Navigation Co Ltd. The name Hellenic Bee had been allocated, but on 29 August 1948 she ran aground on Domanik Island, Bay of Bengal (21°53′N 90°48′E), and then sank.

== Official Numbers and Code Letters ==
Official Numbers were a forerunner to IMO Numbers. Empire Bulbul had the United Kingdom Official Number 147002.

Jamnagar used the Code Letters MNLX. Empire Bulbul used the Code Letters MNLS.
