= SS Empire Buckler =

World War II merchant ship of the United Kingdom

History
- Name: Empire Buckler (1942-46); Ovingdean Grange (1946-59); Sabrina (1959-61); Noemi (1961-65)
- Owner: Ministry of War Transport (1942-46); Houlder Bros & Co Ltd (1946-59); Devon Shipping Co Ltd (1959-61); Compagnia Navigazione Marcasa SA (1961-65)
- Operator: Houlder Bros & Co Ltd (1942-59); Empresa Navigacion Proamar SRL (1959-61); J Livanos & Sons Ltd (1961-65)
- Port of registry: (United Kingdom) Greenock (1942-59); Liberia (1959-61); Lebanon (1961-65)
- Builder: Lithgows Ltd, Port Glasgow
- Yard number: 979
- Launched: 30 June 1942
- Completed: September 1942
- Out of service: 17 December 1965
- Identification: UK Official Number 168987 (1942-59); Liberian Official Number 1354 (1959-61); Code Letters BCVV (1942-59)
- Fate: Ran aground

General characteristics
- Type: Type Y4 Cargo ship
- Tonnage: 7,046 GRT; 4,906 NRT; 9,959 DWT
- Length: 432 ft 2 in (131.72 m)
- Beam: 56 ft 2 in (17.12 m)
- Depth: 34 ft 2 in (10.41 m)
- Propulsion: 1 x triple expansion steam engine
- Speed: 12 knots (22 km/h)

Empire Buckler was a 7,046 GRT cargo ship which was built in 1941 by Lithgows Ltd for the Ministry of War Transport (MoWT). Postwar she was sold into merchant service, being renamed Ovingdean Grange, Sabrina, and Noemi, serving until she ran aground in 1965 and was declared a constructive total loss.

== Description ==
Empire Buckler was built by Lithgows Ltd, Port Glasgow. She was yard number 979. Launched on 30 June 1942, she was completed in September 1942.

The ship was 432 feet 2 inches (131.72 m) long, with a beam of 56 feet 2 inches (17.12 m) and a depth of 34 feet 2 inches (10.41 m). She was propelled by a triple expansion steam engine which had cylinders of 24 1/2 inches (62 cm), 39 inches (99 cm), and 70 inches (180 cm) bore by 48 inches (120 cm) stroke. The engine was built by D Rowan & Co Ltd, Glasgow. The ship had a speed of 12 knots (22 km/h). She had a GRT of 7,046 with a NRT of 4,906. Her DWT was 9,959.

== Career ==
=== Wartime ===
Empire Buckler's port of registry was Greenock. She was operated under the management of Houlder Brothers Ltd. She was a member of a number of convoys during the Second World War.

KMS 2

Convoy KMS 2 departed from Loch Ewe on 25 October 1942, with sections sailing from Liverpool and the Clyde on 26 October. It arrived at Gibraltar on 10 November, Oran, Algeria, on 11 November, and Algiers on 12 November. Empire Buckler was carrying a cargo of 600 tons of petrol, 843 tons of stores, and nine troops. On 27 October, Empire Buckler hauled out from the convoy as her cargo had shifted. She later rejoined the convoy.

MKS 3X

Convoy MKS 3X departed Bône, Algeria, on 3 December 1942, and arrived at Liverpool on 19 December. Empire Buckler joined the convoy at Gibraltar. On 14 December, Empire Buckler lost her propeller and was adrift for several days. She arrived at Swansea under tow on 20 December.

MKS 9

Convoy MKS 9 departed Bône on 4 March 1943, and Algiers on 6 March. It arrived at Liverpool on 18 March. Empire Buckler was likely a member of this convoy.

On 24 February 1944, Empire Buckler was sighted at 08°51′N 20°21′W by U-66, but the submarine was being pursued at the time and was unable to attack. U-66 reported the sighting to U-123.

=== Postwar ===
In 1946, Empire Buckler was sold to Houlder Bros and renamed Ovingdean Grange. She served Houlder's until 1959 when she was sold to Devon Shipping Co, Liberia, and renamed Sabrina. She was operated under the management of Empresa Navigacion Proamar SRL, Argentina. In 1961, she was sold to Compagnia Navigazione Marcasa SA and renamed Noemi. She was reflagged to Lebanon and operated under the management of J Livanos & Sons Ltd, London. On 17 December 1965, Noemi ran aground at Masirah, Oman, and was declared a constructive total loss. The wreckage of the ship was then partially salvaged.

== Official Numbers and Code Letters ==
Official Numbers were a forerunner to IMO Numbers. Empire Buckler, and Ovingdean Grange had the UK Official Number 168987. Sabrina had the Liberian Official Number 1354 Empire Buckler and Ovingdean Grange used the Code Letters BCVV.

== Culture and media ==
Empire Buckler under tow after the loss of her propeller is the subject of a painting by Montague Dawson.
