= ST Empire Birch =

History
- Name: Empire Birch
- Owner: Ministry of War Transport
- Operator: Ministry of War Transport
- Port of registry: (United Kingdom) Hull
- Builder: Henry Scarr Ltd, Hessle.
- Yard number: 418
- Launched: 9 August 1941
- Completed: 12 December 1941
- Identification: UK Official Number 167111; Code Letters BCVM
- Fate: Struck mine, beached, and sank 10 August 1942

General characteristics
- Tonnage: 245 GRT, 229 NRT
- Length: 106 ft 7 in (32.49 m)
- Beam: 26 ft 7 in (8.10 m)
- Draught: 11 ft 6 in (3.51 m)
- Propulsion: One triple expansion steam engine 177 hp (132 kW).

Location of the sinking of Empire Birch off Mozambique.

Empire Birch was a 245 GRT tug built in 1941 for the Ministry of War Transport (MoWT). In 1942 she struck a mine and sank.

== Description ==
Empire Birch was built by Henry Scarr Ltd, Hessle. She was yard number 418 and was launched on 9 August 1941 with completion on 12 December. She was 106 feet 7 inches (32.49 m) long, with a beam of 26 feet 7 inches (8.10 m) and a draught of 11 feet 6 inches (3.51 m). Her GRT was 245 with a NRT of 229.

== Career ==
Empire Birch was operated by the MoWT, her port of registry was Hull. She was the lead ship of the Birch-class tugs. On 10 August 1942, Empire Birch hit a mine in the Indian Ocean off the coast of Portuguese East Africa 150 nautical miles (280 km) north of Lourenço Marques (24°45′S 34°47′E). Although she was beached and abandoned, Empire Birch slid off the beach and sank in deep water.

== Official Numbers and Code Letters ==
Official Numbers were a forerunner to IMO Numbers. Empire Bermuda had the UK Official Number 167111 and the Code Letters BCMV.

== Propulsion ==
Empire Birch was propelled by a triple expansion steam engine which had cylinders of 16 inches (41 cm), 26 inches (66 cm) and 43 inches (110 cm) bore by 30 inches (76 cm) stroke. It was built by the O D Holmer & Co, Hull.
