= MV Empire Baron =

World War II merchant ship of the United Kingdom

History
- Name: Monte Piana (1926–42); Empire Baron (1942–47); Rubystone (1947–60)
- Owner: Navigazione Generale Gerolimich & Compagnia Società in Anzioni, Trieste; 1926–40; Ministry of War Transport (1940–47); Navigation & Coal Trade Ltd, London (1947–51); Alvion Steamship Co Ltd, Panama (1951–60)
- Operator: Navigazione Generale Gerolimich & Compagnia Società in Anzioni, Trieste (1926–40); British-India Steam Navigation Co Ltd (1941–47); Navigation & Coal Trade Ltd, London (1947–51); Alvion Steamship Co Ltd, Panama (1951–60)
- Port of registry: (Italy) Trieste (1926–40); (United Kingdom) London (1940–51); Panama (1951–60)
- Builder: Cantiere Navale Triestino, Monfalcone
- Completed: July 1926
- Out of service: August 1960
- Identification: Italian Official Number 258 (1926–40); UK Official Number 174207 (1940–51); Code Letters NZLO (1926–33); Code Letters IBJX (1934–40); Code Letters ZNAH (1940–41); Code Letters BCSN (1941–47)
- Fate: Scrapped August 1960

General characteristics
- Tonnage: 5,890 GRT
- Length: 416 ft 8 in (127.00 m)
- Beam: 53 ft 2 in (16.21 m)
- Depth: 24 ft 7 in (7.49 m)
- Propulsion: 2 x 6-cylinder SCSA diesel engines (Stabilimento Technico, Trieste) 489 hp (365 kW)
- Speed: 10 knots (19 km/h)

Empire Baron was a 5,890 GRT cargo ship which was built in 1926 for Navigazione Generale Gerolimich & Compagnia Società in Anzioni, Trieste, Italy. She was captured by the Royal Navy in 1940 and ownership passed to the Ministry of War Transport (MoWT). She was renamed Empire Baron. She was sold in 1947 to Navigation & Coal Trade Ltd, London and renamed Rubystone. She was sold to a Panamanian company in 1951 and was scrapped in 1960.

== History ==
=== Pre-war ===
Monte Piana was built by Cantiere Navale Triestino, Monfalcone for Navigazione Generale Gerolimich & Compagnia Società in Anzioni, Trieste. She was completed in July 1926 and named after the Northern Italian mountain of the same name. On 18 June 1933, Monte Piana was in collision with the Greek ship P Margaronis in the River Plate, in Argentine waters. Both ships sustained damage to their bows, with their forepeaks flooded. On 18 May 1937, Monte Piana departed Calcutta, India for Genoa, Italy. A fire broke out in one of her holds. It was brought under control and Monte Piana returned to port.

=== War service ===
On 10 June 1940, Monte Piana was captured by the Royal Navy at Aden. She was beached after her crew attempted to scuttle her. In 1941, her ownership was passed to the MoWT. Attempts to repair her electrical system and engines at Aden were unsuccessful, and she was towed to Vizagapatam, India by SS Nirvana, arriving on 23 February 1941. She was repaired and placed under the management of British-India Steam Navigation Company. Repairs were completed by June 1941 as Monte Piana sailed from Calcutta on 10 June, arriving at Rangoon, Burma on 9 July. She departed Calcutta on 19 August 1941 and joined Convoy SL 93 which departed Freetown, Sierra Leone on 19 November 1941 and arrived at Liverpool on 10 December. She was carrying a cargo of tea, jute and pig iron and was bound for Oban, Argyllshire. She then sailed to Dundee. At some point, Monte Piana was renamed Empire Baron. Although this name change took place on paper in 1941, she was still operating under the name Monte Piana in 1942. Empire Baron was a member of a number of convoys during the Second World War

OS 34

Convoy OS 34 departed Liverpool on 11 July 1942 and arrived at Freetown on 30 July. Empire Baron had started her voyage at Oban and was bound for Durban and Calcutta with a load of Government stores.

OS 58

Convoy OS 58 departed Liverpool on 5 November 1943 and arrived at Freetown on 28 November. Empire Baron had started her voyage at the Clyde and was bound for Cape Town and East London, South Africa and then Basra, Iraq.

MKS 43

Convoy MKS 43 sailed from Gibraltar on 22 March 1944 and arrived at Liverpool on 4 April 1944. Empire Baron had started her voyage at Mombasa, Kenya and called at Beira, Mozambique. She was carrying a cargo of Chrome ore, general cargo and mails and was bound for Loch Ewe.

KMS 61

Convoy KMS 61 sailed from Liverpool on 25 August 1944 and arrived at Gibraltar on 4 September. Empire Baron had started her voyage at Belfast and was bound for Port Said, Egypt with a cargo of coal.

=== Postwar ===
In 1947, Empire Baron was sold to Navigation & Coal Trade Ltd, London and renamed Rubystone. She was operated by them for four years before being sold in 1951 to Alvion Steamship Co, Panama. Rubystone was scrapped in August 1960 at Nagasaki, Japan.

== Propulsion ==
She was propelled two 6-cylinder SCSA diesel engines of 489 horsepower (365 kW) which were built by Stabilimento Tecnico Triestino, Trieste.

== Official number and code letters ==
Official Numbers were a forerunner to IMO Numbers. Monte Piana had the Italian Official Number 258 until 1940 and the UK Official Number from 1940. She used the Code Letters NZLO until 1933. IBJX from 1934, and ZNAH from 1941. Empire Baron had the UK Official Number 174207 and used the Code Letters BCSN
