= SS Seniority =

History
- Name: Empire Boswell (1942–47); Aviswell (1947–49); Seniority (1949–50)
- Owner: Ministry of War Transport (1942–47); Aviation & Shipping Co Ltd (1947–49); F T Everard & Co Ltd (1949–50)
- Operator: Currie Line Ltd (1942–45); British India Steam Navigation Co (1945–47); Purvis Shipping Co Ltd (1947–49); F T Everard & Co Ltd (1949–50)
- Port of registry: (United Kingdom) West Hartlepool (1942–47); United Kingdom (1947–50)
- Builder: William Gray & Co. Ltd., West Hartlepool
- Yard number: 1135
- Launched: 2 June 1942
- Completed: August 1942
- Out of service: 7 November 1950
- Identification: UK Official Number 168945; Code Letters BFBP (1942–47)
- Fate: Ran aground then sank

General characteristics
- Tonnage: 2,876 GRT
- Length: 315 ft 4 in (96.11 m)
- Beam: 46 ft 5 in (14.15 m)
- Depth: 23 ft (7.01 m)
- Propulsion: 1 x triple expansion steam engine

Seniority was an 2,876 GRT cargo ship which was built in 1942 as Empire Boswell for the Ministry of War Transport (MoWT). Postwar she was sold into merchant service as Aviswell and Seniority, serving until she ran aground on 7 November 1950. Although refloated, she sank on 8 November 1950.

== Description ==
The ship was built by William Gray & Co. Ltd., West Hartlepool. She was yard number 738. Launched as Empire Boswell on 2 June 1942, she was completed in August 1942.

The ship was 315 feet 4 inches (96.11 m) long, with a beam of 46 feet 5 inches (14.15 m) and a depth of 23 feet (7.01 m). She was propelled by a triple expansion steam engine which had cylinders of 20 inches (51 cm), 34 inches (86 cm) and 55 inches (140 cm) bore by 39 inches (99 cm) stroke. The engine was built by the Central Marine Engine Works, West Hartlepool.

== Career ==
Empire Boswell's port of registry was West Hartlepool. She was initially operated under the management of Currie Line Ltd. She was a member of a number of convoys during the Second World War.

ON 160

Convoy ON 169 departed from the United Kingdom on 12 January 1943 and arrived at Ambrose on 5 February. Empire Boswell is noted as a straggler from this convoy.

SC 129

Convoy SC 129 departed from Halifax, Nova Scotia on 2 May 1943 and arrived at Liverpool on 21 May.

UGS 18

Convoy UGS 18 departed from the Hampton Roads, United States on 15 September 1943 and arrived at Port Said on 13 October. Empire Boswell joined the convoy at Gibraltar and left at Bône, Algeria.

In 1945, management of Empire Boswell was transferred to the British-India Steam Navigation Company. In 1947, Empire Boswell was sold to Aviation & Shipping Co Ltd and renamed Aviswell. She was operated under the management of Purvis Shipping Co Ltd.

In 1949, Aviswell was sold to F T Everard & Co Ltd and renamed Seniority. On 7 November 1950, Seniority ran aground at Leinish Point, Inner Hebrides (56°57′N 7°26′W). Although refloated, she sank the next day off the Bo Vich Chuan Rock.

== Official Numbers and Code Letters ==
Official Numbers were a forerunner to IMO Numbers. The ship had the UK Official Number 168945. Empire Boswell used the Code Letters BCBP.
