= List of Empire ships (H) =

WWII Cargo Ships

== Suffix beginning with H ==
=== Empire Haig ===
Empire Haig was a 9,912 GRT cargo liner, built by Lithgows Ltd, Port Glasgow. Launched on 6 October 1944 and completed in December 1944. Sailed Greenock to Bombay 28 January 1945 for Ellerman City, Hall line. Returned Madras to Liverpool for Elder Dempster, arrived 3 May 1945. Sold in 1946 to Lamport & Holt Ltd and renamed Dryden. Sold in 1952 to Blue Star Line and renamed Freemantle Star. Renamed Catalina Star in 1957. Chartered in 1963 by Lamport & Holt Ltd and renamed Devis. Sold in 1969 to Bry Overseas Navigation Inc, Panama and renamed Mondia. Arrived on 23 December 1969 at Kaohsiung, Taiwan for scrapping.

=== Empire Hail ===
Empire Hail was a 7,005 GRT cargo ship, built by Lithgows Ltd, Port Glasgow. Launched on 27 December 1940 and completed in February 1941. Torpedoed on 23 February 1942 and sunk by U-94 east of St. John's, Newfoundland (44°48′N 40°21′W).

=== Empire Halberd ===
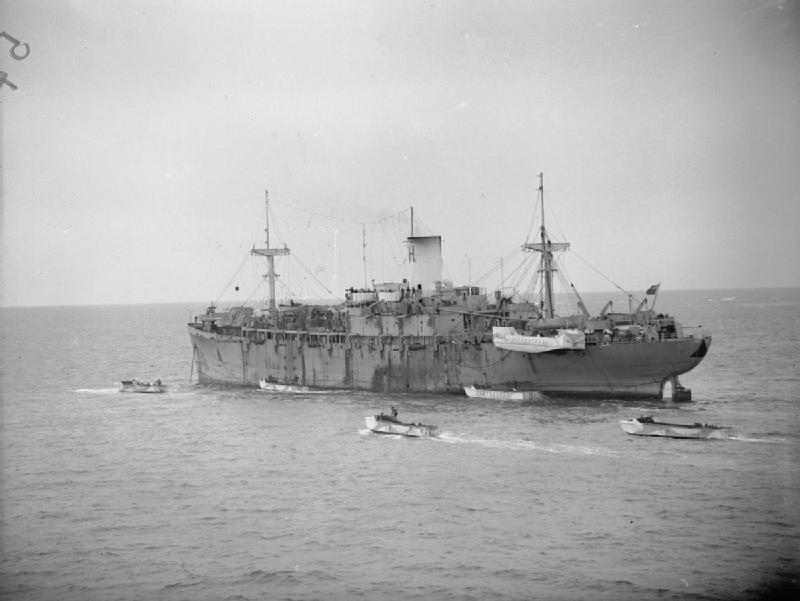
Empire Halberd

Empire Halberd was a 7,177 GRT type C1 ship, built by Consolidated Steel Corp, Wilmington, Los Angeles. Laid down as Cape Gregory and launched in November 1943 as Empire Halberd. Hit a mine on 6 July 1944 4 nautical miles (7.4 km) from the Longships Lighthouse. Proceeded to port under her own power and was repaired. Commissioned as HMS Silvio (F160) in September 1944. Returned to MoWT in November 1945. To United States Maritime Commission (USMC) in June 1948 and laid up in the James River, renamed Cape Gregory. Renamed Imperial Halberd at an unrecorded date, scrapped in December 1966 at Baltimore, Maryland.

=== Empire Haldane ===
Empire Haldane was a 7,087 GRT cargo ship, built by J L Thompson & Sons Ltd, Sunderland. Launched on 20 July 1944 and completed in September 1944. Sold in 1947 to Goulandris Bros Ltd, London and renamed Granford. Sold in 1957 to San Pedro Compagnia Armadora SA, Panama and renamed Fulmar. Sold in 1965 to Bianca Carriers Inc, Liberia and renamed Bianca Venture. Operated under the management of Wah Kwong & Co (Hong Kong) Ltd, Hong Kong. Ran aground on 8 November 1965 40 nautical miles (74 km) north of Mukho, South Korea (38°09′N 128°36′E). Broke in two on 11 November, a total loss.

=== Empire Halladale ===
Empire Halladale was a 14,056 GRT liner, built by Vulkan Werke, Hamburg. Launched in 1921 as Antonio Delfino for Hamburg South America Line. Chartered in 1932 to Norddeutscher Lloyd and renamed Sierra Nevada. Returned to Hamburg South America Line in 1934 and renamed Antonio Delfino. When the war broke out, she was in port in Bahia, Brazil. She ran the blockade and reached Germany. Requisitioned by the Kriegsmarine in 1940, used as a barracks ship at Kiel then from 1943 at Gdynia. In 1944 she became a command ship for the Admiral of Submarines at Gdynia. In 1945 she was used to evacuate refugees and wounded military personnel from Gdynia, carrying a total of 20,522 people in five voyages. Seized in May 1945 as a war prize in Copenhagen. To MoWT and renamed Empire Halladale. Refitted as a troopship by John Brown & Co, Clydebank. On 31 August 1946, she inaugurated a troopship service between Tilbury and Cuxhaven, in which period she also transported families of UK military personnel who were to live in Germany, later serving in the Middle East and the Far East. Laid up in October 1955 at Glasgow. Scrapped in February 1956 at Dalmuir, West Dunbartonshire.

=== Empire Halley ===
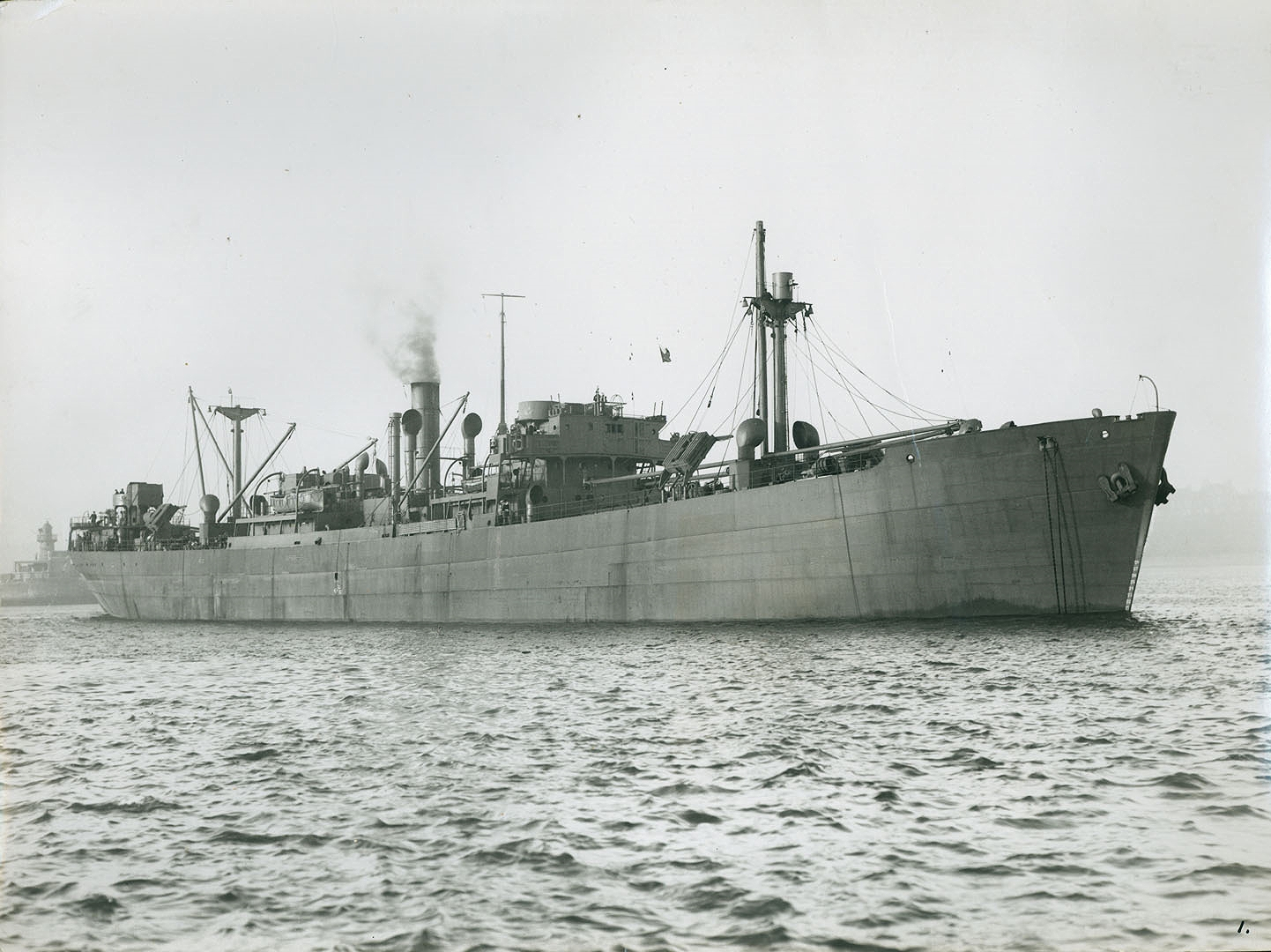
Empire Halley on her sea trials

Empire Halley was a 7,168 GRT cargo ship, built by J L Thompson & Sons Ltd, Sunderland. Launched on 26 September 1941 and completed in December 1941. Allocated in 1942 to the Dutch Government and renamed Pieter de Hoogh. Sold in 1947 to Stoomvart Maatschappij Oostzee, Netherlands and renamed Britsum. Operated under the management of Vinke & Zonen, Amsterdam. Arrived on 24 August 1959 at Osaka, Japan for scrapping.

=== Empire Hamble ===
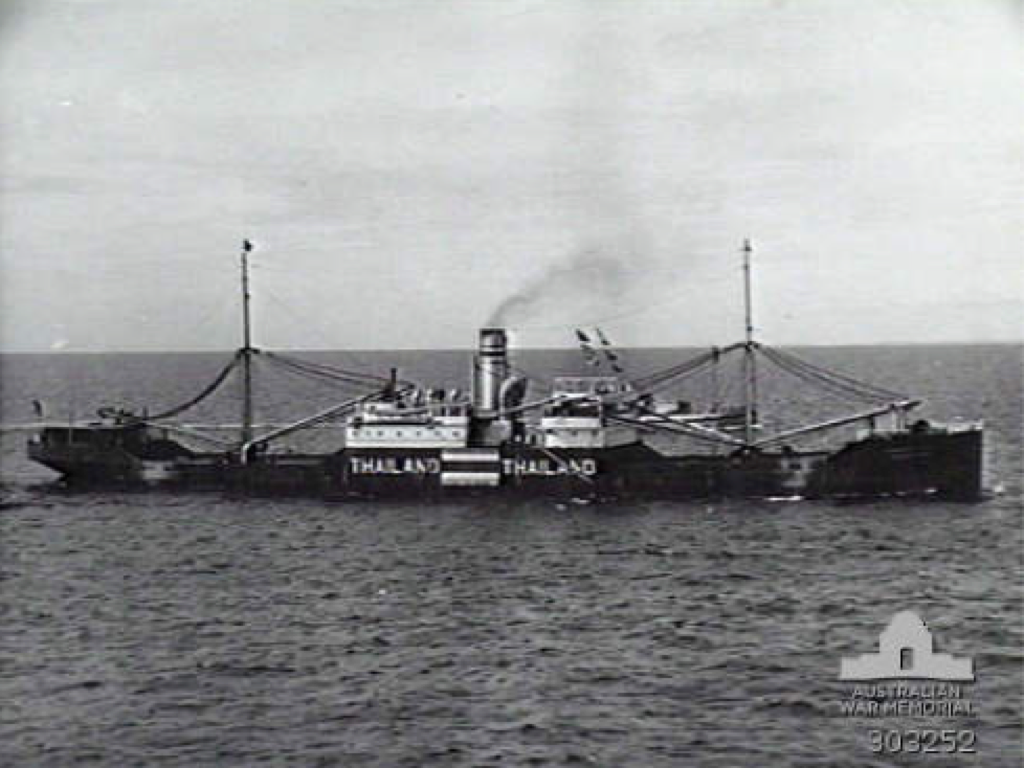
Thai cargo ship Thepsatri Nawa, later taken over by the UK as the Empire Hamble.

Empire Hamble was a 3,260 GRT cargo ship, U.S. Shipping Board Emergency Fleet Corporation Design 1023, built by Submarine Boat Corp, Newark, New Jersey after the USSB contract was terminated for Transmarine, formed for the purpose of completing planned hulls, under the names Nebelow / Sulanierco, launched 23 August 1920 as Sulanierco, sold in 1931 to Portland California Steamship Co, Seattle renamed Admiral Senn for operation with the Admiral Line. Sold in 1940 to Thai Niyom Panich Co Ltd, Bangkok and renamed Threpsatri Nawa. Seized by UK in 1941 as a war prize. To MoWT and renamed Empire Hamble. Operated by the United States Army 15 October 1942 – March 1946 as part of the South West Pacific Area Command's permanent local fleet, assigned the "X" number 37, under allocation by MoWT. Empire Hamble was a sister ship to the Coast Farmer, sunk 21 July 1942, and Admiral Halstead that were both in the Pensacola Convoy that was headed to the Philippines and diverted to Australia on 7 December 1941. All were among the original SWPA ships. Sold in 1947 to Bulk Storage Co Ltd, which became Basinghall Shipping Co. Scrapped in February 1950 in Bombay, India.

=== Empire Harbour ===
Empire Harbour was a 797 GRT coastal tanker, built by Grangemouth Dockyard Co Ltd, Grangemouth. Launched on 6 February 1943 and completed in May 1943. Sold in 1946 to Anglo-American Oil Co Ltd and renamed Esso Genesse. To Esso Petroleum Co Ltd in 1951. Scrapped in 1961 in Tamise, Belgium.

=== Empire Harcourt ===
Empire Harcourt was a 2,905 GRT cargo ship, built by William Gray & Co Ltd, West Hartlepool. Launched on 30 October 1943 and completed in January 1944. Sold in 1946 to Kelvin Shipping Co Ltd and renamed Baron Ailsa. Operated under the management of H Hogarth & Sons Ltd. Sol in 1955 to W H Muller & Co NV, Rotterdam and renamed Iberia. Sold in 1962 to Tankers Finance Corp, Greece, and renamed Cycladiki Doxa. Operated under the management of S Restis, Greece. Sold in 1964 to Compagnia Maritime Sarita SA, Greece, and renamed Mount Sinai. Operated under the management of N Sotirakis & Co, Greece. Scrapped in April 1972 in Perama, Greece.

=== Empire Harlequin ===
Empire Harlequin was a 235 GRT tug, built by A Hall & Co Ltd, Aberdeen. Launched on 2 August 1943 and completed in October 1943. Sold in 1947 to Sudan Railways and renamed El Gadir. Reported to have been scrapped in 1965.

=== Empire Harmony ===
Empire Harmony was a 2,906 GRT cargo ship, built by William Gray & Co Ltd, West Hartlepool. Launched on 8 January 1943 and completed in March 1943. Sold in 1947 to Aviation & Shipping Co Ltd and renamed Avisbrook. Operated under the management of Purvis Shipping Co Ltd, London. Sold in 1950 to T Stone (Shipping) Ltd and renamed Menastone. Operated under the management of Stone & Rolfe Ltd, Swansea. Sold in 1961 to Ypapanti AS, Panama, and renamed Capetan Panaos. Operated under the management of K & M Shipbrokers Ltd, London. Sold in 1966 to Astrocierto Compangia Navigazione, Panama. Operated under the management of N K Noumikos, Greece. Ran aground on 7 May 1969 at Kilyos, Black Sea. Refloated on 22 May and beached near Büyükdere. Refloated on 9 August and cargo of timber discharged. Arrived on 2 November 1969 at Piraeus, Greece for scrapping.

=== Empire Harp ===
Empire Harp was an 859 GRT coastal tanker, built by Goole Shipbuilding & Repairing Co Ltd, Goole. Launched on 22 November 1941 and completed in January 1942. Sold in 1948 to Kuwait Oil Co Ltd and renamed Anis. Sold in 1954 to F T Everard & Sons Ltd and renamed Authenticity. Sold in 1966 to John S Latsis, Greece, and renamed Petrola I. Scrapped in 1984 in Aspropyrgos, Greece.

=== Empire Harry ===
Empire Harry was a 487 GRT tug which, by Goole Shipbuilding & Repairing Co Ltd, Goole. Launched on 12 October 1942 and completed in March 1943. Ran aground on 6 June 1945 at Beacon Point, Devon, broke up and declared a total loss.

=== Empire Hartebeeste ===
Empire Hartebeeste was a 5,676 GRT cargo ship, built by Skinner & Eddy Corp, Seattle. Launched in 1918 as West Gambo for the United States Shipping Board (USSB). To Lykes Bros-Ripley Steamship Co Inc. To MoWT in 1941 and renamed Empire Hartebeeste. Torpedoed on 20 September and sunk by U-596 at 56°20′N 38°10′W while a member of Convoy SC 100.

=== Empire Hartland ===
Empire Hartland was a 683 GRT hopper ship, built by Ferguson Brothers Ltd, Port Glasgow. Launched on 16 May 1946 and completed later that year. Sold to the Mersey Docks and Harbour Board and renamed Mersey No 3. Sold in 1965 to Westminster Dredging Co Ltd, London and renamed WD Alpha. Sold in 1968 to Hok Kiang Heng Co and renamed WK Alpha. Operated under the management of P N Waskita Karya, Indonesia. sold in 1972 to Qon Char Koon, Singapore and renamed WD Alpha.

=== Empire Harvest ===
Empire Harvest was an 814 GRT coastal tanker, built by A & J Inglis Ltd, Glasgow. Launched on 10 November 1943 and completed in December 1943. Sold in 1946 to Shell Mex & BP Ltd and renamed Shelbrit 5. Renamed BP Engineer in 1952. Scrapped in June 1965 in Antwerp, Belgium.

=== Empire Haven ===
Empire Haven was a 6,603 GRT cargo ship, built by Taikoo Dockyard & Engineering Company, Hong Kong. Launched on 28 April 1941 and completed in June 1941. Torpedoed on 13 August 1943 by enemy aircraft north of Oran, Algeria (36°15′N 02°23′W). Towed to Gibraltar by a Royal Navy ship. Towed to the UK for repairs. Sold in 1947 to R Chapman & Sons, Newcastle upon Tyne and renamed Clearton. Sold in 1956 to Compagnia Maritime Amaconte, Liberia, and renamed Amaconte. Operated under the management of J Ponte Naya, Spain. Scrapped in January 1970 at Avilés, Spain.

=== Empire Hawk ===
Empire Hawk was a 5,032 GRT cargo ship, built by American International Shipbuilding, Hog Island, Philadelphia. Completed in 1919 as Coahoma County for the USSB. To American Diamond Lines Inc in 1931 and renamed Black Tern in 1932. To MoWT in 1941 and renamed Empire Hawk. Torpedoed on 12 December 1942 and sunk by Italian submarine Enrico Tazzoli at 05°56′N 39°50′W.

=== Empire Hawksbill ===
Empire Hawksbill was a 5,724 GRT cargo ship, built by Southwestern Shipbuilding, San Pedro, Los Angeles. Completed in 1920 as West Nivaria for the USSB. To Oceanic and Oriental Steamship Co, San Francisco in 1928 and renamed Golden Coast. To American Hawaiian Steamship Co, San Francisco in 1937 and renamed Delawarian. To MoWt in 1940 and renamed Empire Hawksbill. Torpedoed on 19 July 1942 and sunk by U-564 at 42°29′N 25°56′W while a member of Convoy OS 34.

=== Empire Hazlitt ===
Empire Hazlitt was a 7,036 GRT cargo ship, built by John Readhead & Sons Ltd, South Shields. Launched on 14 May 1942 and completed in July 1942. Transferred to the Dutch Government in 1943 and renamed Aelbert Cuyp. Sold in 1946 to Van Uden's Scheep & Agentuur Maatschappij NV, Rotterdam and renamed Delfshaven. Sold in 1960 to Zenith Transportation Corp, Liberia, and renamed Edina. Operated under the management of F Delfino SRL, Italy. Sold in 1961 to Consolidated Navigation Corporation, Liberia, and renamed Confidence. Operated under the management of Expedo & Co (London) Ltd. Arrived in December 1966 at Kaohsiung, Taiwan for scrapping.

=== Empire Head ===
Empire Head was a 489 GRT coaster, built by Clelands (Successors) Ltd, Wallsend. Launched on 13 May 1941 and completed in October 1941. Damaged by enemy bombing 11 nautical miles (20 km)east of Hartlepool, proceeded to Middlesbrough where repairs were carried out. Sold in 1945 to J Wharton (Shipping) Ltd, Goole and renamed Brendonia. Sold in 1964 to N Dimitriadis & Co, Greece and renamed Ifigenia. Sold in 1976 to S Mohamet, Syria and renamed Hamzi. On 19 January 1983, she was found aground and abandoned at Golovasi, Yumurtalık Bay, Turkey. Refloated and disposed of by local Port Authority.

=== Empire Hearth ===
Empire Hearth was a 2,020 GRT collier, built by Grangemouth Dockyard Co Ltd, Grangemouth. Launched on 16 February 1942 and completed in May 1942. Sold in 1945 to William France, Fenwick & Co Ltd and renamed Kentwood. Sold in 1956 to Ouse Steamship Co Ltd and renamed Mayfleet. Operated under the management of E P Atkinson & Sons, Goole. Scrapped in May 1961 in Dublin, Ireland.

=== Empire Heath ===
Empire Heath was a 6,640 GRT CAM ship, built by Bartram & Sons Ltd, Sunderland. Launched on 27 April 1941 and completed in July 1941. Torpedoed on 11 May 1944 and sunk by U-129 northeast of Rio de Janeiro, Brazil (approximate position 19°S 31°W).

=== Empire Heathland ===
Empire Heathland was a 683 GRT hopper ship, built by Fleming & Ferguson Ltd, Paisley. Launched on 2 April 1945 and completed in May 1945. To the Superintendent Civil Engineer, Bombay in 1945. Sold in 1947 to Mersey Docks & Harbour Board and renamed Mersey No 4. Sold in 1964 to Westminster Dredging Co Ltd, London, and renamed WD Beta. Sold in 1968 to Hok Kiang Heng Co and renamed WK Beta. Operated under the management of P N Waskita Karya, Indonesia. Sold in 1972 to Qon Char Koon, Singapore, and renamed WD Beta.

=== Empire Hedda ===
Empire Hedda was a 292 GRT tug, built by Cochrane & Sons Ltd, Selby. Laid down as Empire Doreen but launched on 4 February 1946 as Empire Hedda and completed in September 1946 as Atlas for Bergnings och Dykari A/B Neptun, Sweden. Sold in 1965 to Rim. Sardi, Italy, and renamed Maroso. Scrapped in 1986 in Italy.

=== Empire Helen ===
Empire Helen was a 275 GRT tug, built by Cochrane & Sons Ltd, Selby. Launched on 11 July 1945 and completed in June 1946. Sold in 1946 to Overseas Towage & Salvage Co Ltd and renamed Nereidia. Sold in 1951 to Les Abeilles Compagnie des Remorquage Sauvignon, Le Havre, France and renamed Abeille No 7. Sold in 1965 to Rim. Sardi, Italy, and renamed Sergio. Scrapped in 1984 at Porto Torres, Italy.

=== Empire Helford ===
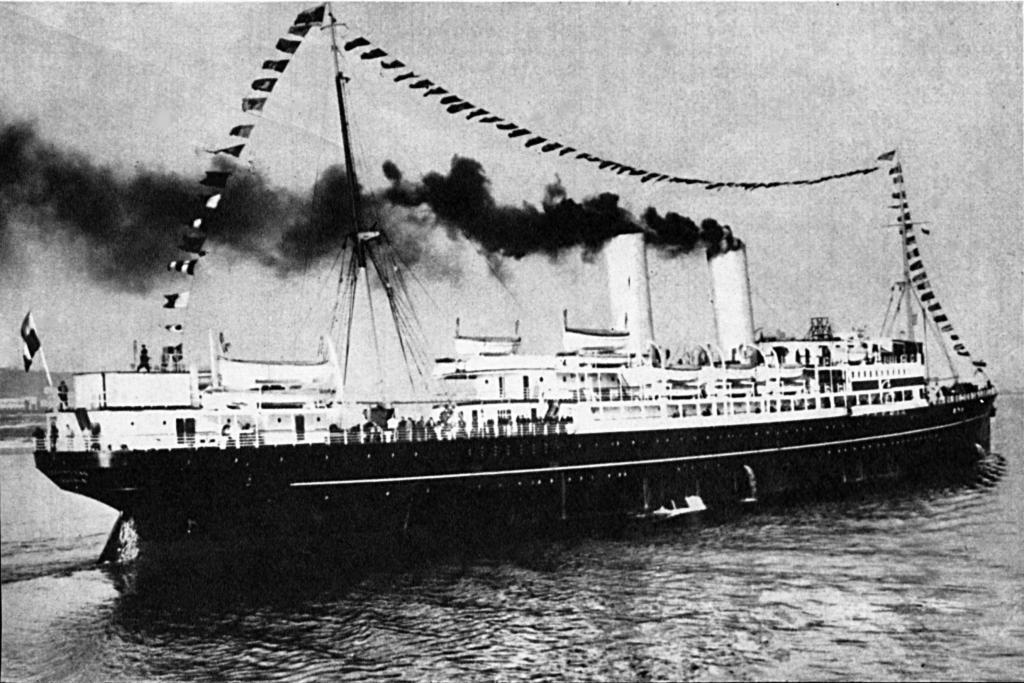
Kościuszko

Empire Helford was a 6,598 GRT liner, built by Barclay, Curle & Co Ltd, Glasgow. Launched in 1915 as Czaritza for the Russian American Line. Requisitioned by the British Government following the Russian Revolution. Reverted to Russian American Line in 1920 and renamed Lituania. Sold in 1930 to Polish Transatlantic Shipping Company and renamed Kościuszko. The company was later renamed Gdynia America Shipping Line. Requisitioned by the Polish Navy at the outbreak of way and renamed ORP Gdynia. Used as a depot ship and accommodation ship at Devonport and then used as a troopship. At the end of the war, her Polish crew refused to recognise Russian control of Poland and signed British articles of maritime employment. The ship reverted to the name Kościuszko. Taken over by the Ministry of Transport in 1946 and renamed Empire Helford. Operated under the management of Lamport & Holt Line on trooping duties between the Calcutta and Rangoon, Burma. Scrapped in 1950 at Blyth, Northumberland.

=== Empire Helmsdale ===
Empire Helmsdale was a 2,978 GRT cargo ship, built by Deutsche Werft, Hamburg. Launched in 1934 as Sofia. Sold in 1938 to Oldenburg Portuguese Line and renamed Telde. Requisitioned in 1940 by the Kriegsmarine. Seized in May 1945 at Copenhagen, to MoWT and renamed Empire Helmsdale. Allocated to the United States in 1945, to USMC. Sold in 1948 to Sea Trade Corporation, New York and renamed Sea Trader, now 4,290 GRT. Sold in 1949 to Lloyd Triestino and renamed Risano. Scrapped in September 1972 in Trieste, Italy.

=== Empire Henchman ===
Empire Henchman was a tug that was built by Cochrane & Sons Ltd, Selby. Launched on 31 August 1939 as Karl for Goteborgs Bogserings & Bargnings Akt, Gothenburg. Requisitioned by MoWT and completed in February 1940 as Empire Henchman. Operated under the management of United Towing Co Ltd. Reverted in 1946 to Goteborgs Bogserings & Bargnings Akt and renamed Karl. Sold in 1963 to Societa di Navigazione Capieci, Italy, and renamed Capo Faro.

=== Empire Herald ===
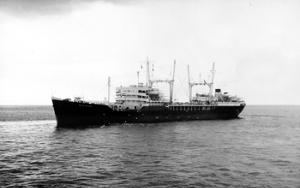
RFA Wave Prince

Empire Herald was an 8,204 GRT tanker, built by Sir J Laing & Sons Ltd, Sunderland. Launched on 27 July 1945 and completed in March 1946. To Royal Fleet Auxiliary in December 1947 as RFA Wave Prince. Arrived on 16 December 1971 at Burriana, Spain, for scrapping.

=== Empire Heritage ===
Empire Heritage was a 15,702 GRT tanker, built by Armstrong Whitworth & Co Ltd, Newcastle upon Tyne. Launched in 1930 as Tafelberg for Kerguelen Sealing & Whaling Co, Cape Town, South Africa. Hit a mine on 28 January 1941 in the Bristol Channel (51°21′N 03°16′W) and beached. Refloated on 27 March 1941 and beached at Whitmore Bay Sands but broke in two and declared a constructive total loss. To MoWT, repaired and renamed Empire Heritage. Torpedoed on 8 September 1944 and sunk by U-482 at 55°27′N 08°01′W while a member of Convoy HXF 305.

The wreck is of interest to scuba divers, being just off Malin Head, County Donegal, Ireland, at a depth of 70m and in waters which are generally of very good visibility. The wreck is broken apart but generally accessible, including her final deck cargo of Sherman tanks and other military vehicles, some of which are tumbled onto the adjacent seabed.

=== Empire Heron ===
Empire Heron was a 6,023 GRT cargo ship, built by Moore Shipbuilding Co, Oakland, California. Completed in 1920 as Mosella for the USSB. To MoWT in 1940 and renamed Empire Heron. Torpedoed on 15 October 1941 and sunk by U-568 at 54°05′N 27°5′W while a member of Convoy SC 48.

=== Empire Heywood ===
Empire Heywood was a 7,050 GRT cargo ship, built by Caledon Shipbuilding & Engineering Co Ltd, Dundee. Launched on 21 October 1941 and completed in March 1942. Sold in 1947 to Saint Line Ltd and renamed Saint Gregory. Operated under the management of Mitchel, Cotts & Co Ltd. Sold in 1962 to Stuart Navigation (Bahamas) Ltd, Hong Kong, and renamed Andros. Sold in 1963 to Escort Shipping Co and renamed Abiko. Operated under the management of World Wide Shipping Co Ltd, Hong Kong. Sold later that year to Pine Steamship Co, operated under the management of Mariner Shipping Co, Hong Kong. Arrived on 15 March 1967 in Hong Kong for scrapping.

=== Empire Highlander ===
Empire Highlander was a 2,135 GRT collier, built by John Crown & Sons Ltd, Sunderland. Launched on 26 June 1945 and completed in October 1945. Sold in 1946 to William France, Fenwick & Co Ltd and renamed Arnewood. Sold in 1960 to G Kouremenos, Greece, and renamed Elias K. Ran aground on 17 January 1967 at the Farasan Islands 16°23′N 41°48′E in rough seas. Refloated on 24 January and towed to Aden, then Port Said. Sailed on 1 April 1967 for Piraeus where she was drydocked. Bottom extensively damaged and repairs deemed uneconomic. Laid up at Piraeus. Scrapped in December 1967 at Split, Yugoslavia.

=== Empire Highway ===
Empire Highway was a 7,166 GRT cargo ship, built by Barclay, Curle & Co Ltd, Glasgow. Launched on 26 August 1942 and completed in October 1942. Bombed on 7 July 1943 and slightly damaged when west of Gibraltar, later repaired. Sold in 1946 to Blue Star Line Ltd and renamed Ionic Star then Napier Star. Transferred within the Blue Star group to Frederick Leyland & Co in 1949, then to Lamport and Holt Line Ltd in 1950, and finally to Booth Steamship Co in 1953. Ran aground on 20 July 1965 off Bahia Potrero, Uruguay. Refloated on 18 August 1965 and towed to Montevideo. Hull was seriously damaged and deemed uneconomic to repair. Scrapped in February 1966 in Montevideo.

=== Empire Hilda ===
Empire Hilda was a 292 GRT tug, built by Blyth Dry Docks & Shipbuilding Co Ltd. Launched on 19 December 1945 and completed in May 1946. Sold in 1949 to J Fisher & Sons Ltd, Barrow in Furness and renamed Fisherhill. Scrapped in June 1968 in Barrow in Furness.

=== Empire Homer ===
Empire Homer was a 6,996 GRT cargo ship, built by Greenock Dockyard Co Ltd, Greenock. Launched on 19 November 1941 and completed in December 1941. Aground on Sandray, Outer Hebrides on 15 January 1942 and broke in two, a total loss.

=== Empire Homestead ===
Empire Homestead was a 296 GRT coastal tanker, built by Rowhedge Ironworks Ltd, Rowhedge. Launched on 10 November 1942 and completed in February 1943. Sold in 1947 to A/S Norske Shell, Norway, and renamed Havskjell. Operated under the management of Anglo-Saxon Petroleum Co Ltd. Solf to Shell Tankers Ltd in 1953. Sold in 1960 to A/S Shellbatane, Norway. Lengthened in 1963, now 372 GRT, (430 DWT). To Shell Nigeria Ltd in 1972 and renamed Nigeria Shell 2. Sold in 1976 to National Oil Marketing Co, Lagos, Nigeria and renamed National Eagle 2. Scrapped in 1984.

=== Empire Honduras ===
Empire Honduras was a 7,320 GRT cargo ship, built by Short Brothers Ltd, Sunderland. Launched on 27 June 1945 and completed in October 1945. Sold in 1948 to Bank Line Ltd and renamed Lochybank. Operated under the management of A Weir & Co Ltd. Sold in 1954 to Halcyon Lijn NV, Rotterdam, and renamed Stad Haarlem. Sold in 1963 to Union Fair Shipping Co Inc, Liberia, and renamed Union Fair. Operated under the management of P S Li, Hong Kong. Scrapped in April 1969 at Kaohsiung, Taiwan.

=== Empire Hope ===
Empire Hope was a 12,688 GRT refrigerated cargo liner, built by Harland & Wolff Ltd, Belfast. Launched on 27 March 1941 and completed in October 1941. Operated under the management of Shaw, Savill & Albion Co Ltd. On 11 August 1942 she was bombed by Junkers Ju 88 and Heinkel He 111 while a member of Convoy WS 21. Her engines were put out of action by eighteen near misses and two direct hits which set her on fire. As she was carrying kerosene, coal and explosives, her crew abandoned ship and were rescued by HMS Penn. Just before midnight on 12 August, Empire Hope was torpedoed by the Italian Submarine Bronzo. The wreck was deemed a hazard to shipping and sunk by HMS Bramham off Galeta Island.

=== Empire Housman ===
Empire Housman was a 7,359 GRT cargo ship, built by William Doxford & Sons Ltd, Sunderland. Launched on 31 August 1943 and completed in December 1943. Torpedoed and damaged on 31 December 1943 by U-545 at 60°30′N 24°35′W while a member of Convoy ON 217. Torpedoed and damaged on 3 January 1944 by U-744 at 60°50′N 22°07′W. The ship was abandoned and taken in tow but sank on 5 January 1944.

=== Empire Howard ===
Empire Howard was a 6,985 GRT cargo ship, built by Lithgows Ltd, Port Glasgow. Launched on 22 October 1941 and completed in December 1941. Torpedoed on 16 April 1942 and sunk by U-403 at 73°48′N 21°32′E while a member (and the ship of the convoy commodore) of Convoy PQ 14.

=== Empire Hudson ===
Empire Hudson was a 7,465 GRT CAM ship, built by J L Thompson & Sons Ltd, Sunderland. Launched on 9 May 1941 and completed in August 1941. Torpedoed and sunk on 10 September 1941 by U-82 at 61°28′N 40°51′W while in Convoy SC 42.

=== Empire Humber ===
Empire Humber was a 9,677 GRT cargo ship, by Burmeister & Wain, Copenhagen. Launched in 1939 as Glengarry for Glen Line Ltd, London. Seized in April 1940 as a war prize by Germany. Served with the Kriegsmarine. Renamed Meerberg in October 1940. Chosen for conversion to a raider in April 1941, given the code name Schiff No 5. Intended to be armed with eight 150 mm (5.9 in), two 80 mm (3.1 in) guns, torpedo tubes an aircraft catapult and space for 150 mines. Sent to the Wilton Fijenoord shipyard in June 1941 for conversion to be carried out but still there in June 1943. Moved to Hamburg for installation of secret equipment. Still not completed by October 1943 when she was due to have entered service.

Renamed Hansa on 10 February 1944 and commissioned as a training ship. Took part in the evacuation of Revel, Estonia in September 1944. In May 1945 she embarked several thousand German troops at Hela destined for the Bay of Lübeck. These troops were still aboard when Hansa was seized as a war prize at Kiel. Hansa was ordered to Methil in June 1945. She was the only ship in the convoy of some forty ships that flew her national flag, the others all flying the flag of surrender. Hansa was considered by the Admiralty to be a war prize, but she was allocated the name Empire Humber by the MoWT. She was ordered to Rotterdam for conversion to a Combined Operations HQ ship for service in the Pacific. Empire Humber was then laid up in Southampton. Japan surrendered during her lay-up, and Empire Humber was arrested on behalf of the Admiralty Marshal, the writ being nailed to the captain's cabin door. Glen Line Ltd, who were managing her for the MoWT ordered her to Gareloch. Despite the representative of the Admiralty insisting that she could not sail, she left Southampton in breach of maritime law. The issue of whether or not she was a war prize was not pursued. In 1946, Empire Humber was returned to Glen Line Ltd and renamed Glengarry. She was transferred to Ocean Steamship Co Ltd in 1970 and renamed Dardanus. She was renamed Glengarry in 1971 for her final voyage to shipbreakers at Sakaide, Japan.

=== Empire Humphrey ===
Empire Humphrey was a 275 GRT tug, built by Cochrane & Sons Ltd, Selby. Launched on 2 September 1943 and completed in January 1944. In August 1944, Empire Humphrey and Empire Betsy towed Empire Beatrice from Dungeness to Blyth Sands after the latter was torpedoed by German E-boats. Sold in 1947 to Nederlands-Indonesia Steenkolen Handel Maatschappij and renamed Suus. Sold in 1959 to the Indonesian Government. Renamed Laut Sawu in 1961. To Surabaya Port Authority, Surabaya in 1964.

=== Empire Hunter ===
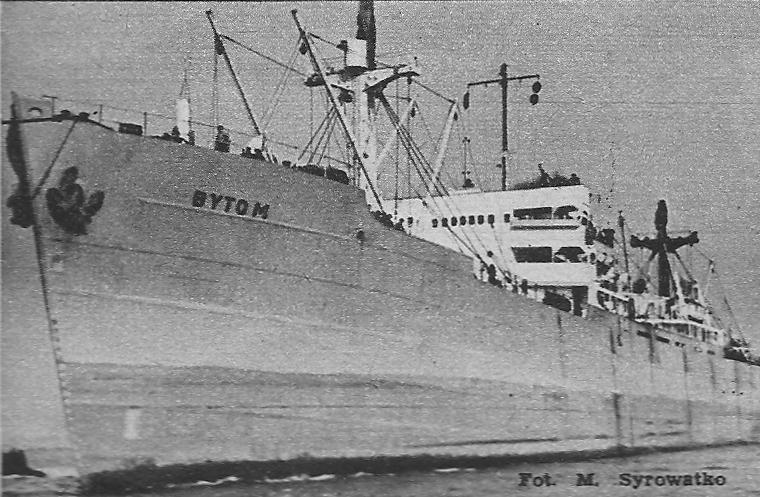
Bytom

Empire Hunter was a 5,967 GRT cargo ship, built by William Pickersgill & Sons Ltd, Sunderland. Launched on 11 September 1942 and completed in November 1942. To the Polish Government in 1943 and renamed Borysław. To Polskie Linie Oceaniczne in 1950 and renamed Bytom. Sold in 1963 to Rejonowe Zakłady Zbożowe PZZ. Converted to a floating warehouse, based at Szczecin and renamed MP-PZZ-2. Sold c. 1970 to Zakłady Obrotu Zbożami Importowanymi i Eksportowymi PZZ.

=== Empire Hurst ===
Empire Hurst was a 2,852 GRT collier, built by William Gray & Co Ltd, West Hartlepool. Launched on 10 May 1941 and completed in July 1941. Sold in 1945 to Burnett Steamship Co Ltd, Newcastle upon Tyne, and renamed Holmside. Sold in 1956 to Shamrock Shipping Co, Northern Ireland and renamed Gransha. Sold in 1960 to Paolo Tomei, Italy, and renamed Daniela T. Sold in 1962 to Capo Nannu Societa di Navigazione, operated under the management of Paolo Tomei. Sold in 1972 to Mediterranea Marittime Sarda SpA, Sardinia and renamed Vulca. Scrapped in June 1974 in Spezia, Italy.

== See also ==
The above entries give a precis of each ship's history. For a more full account see the linked articles.

== Sources ==
- Crabb, Brian James (2014). Operation Pedestal: The story of Convoy WS21S in August 1942. England: Shaun Tyas. ISBN 978-1-907730-19-1.
- Grover, David (1987). US Army Ships and Watercraft of World War II. Annapolis, MD: Naval Institute Press. ISBN 0-87021-766-6.
- Masterson, Dr James R (1949). US Army Transportation In The Southwest Pacific Area 1941–1947. Washington DC: Transportation Unit, Historical Division, Special Staff, US Army.
- Mitchell, WH; Sawyer, LA (1990). The Empire Ships (Second ed.). London, New York, Hamburg, Hong Kong: Lloyd's of London Press. ISBN 1-85044-275-4.
