= G. M. Standifer Construction Company =

American shipyard company

The G. M. Standifer Construction Company was an American company that built three shipyards on the Columbia River for the World War I effort, one in Oregon and two in Washington, all within spitting distance of each other. After the war it maintained its original yard in North Portland, Oregon. The North Portland yard, and one of the Vancouver, Washington yards (located where the Red Lion at the Quay is today, just west of the Interstate Bridge) (45.62329°N 122.67847°W) produced wooden ships. The other Vancouver yard, located just west of what was then the Spokane, Portland and Seattle Railway bridge (now the BNSF bridge, 45.62912°N 122.69107°W) produced steel-hulled ships. The Portland yard was located about a mile to the west, just downstream from the BNSF bridge (45.60729°N 122.68569°W). Both Vancouver yards were closed in 1921.

== Standifer Steel Shipyard (1918–1919) ==
The Vancouver yard, referred to as the Standifier Steel Shipyard, began working steel for the assembly of merchant ships on July 13, 1918, and by October 13, 1918, was handling an average of 200 tons of steel a day with plans to begin producing a completed steel ship every two weeks.

Ships Built by the Standifier Steel Shipyard in Vancouver, Washington
Hull #	Ship Name	USSB #	Owner	Type	Gross tonnage	Delivery Date	Disposition
1	S.S. Cokesit		US Shipping Board	Cargo Ship	6,100	May 1919	Later Adelfoi Chandris 1938, Saint Marin 1941, Catania 1942, bombed 1943 and scrapped 1949
2	S.S. Coaxet		US Shipping Board	Cargo Ship	6,100	July 1919	Later Empire Kingfisher 1941, wrecked off Cape Sable 1942
3	S.S. Waban		US Shipping Board	Cargo Ship	6,100	July 1919	Later Empire Sambar 1940, Empire Beaver 1941, S.S. Norhauk 1942, mined and lost 1943
	S.S. Pawlet		US Shipping Board	Cargo Ship	6,078	February 1920	Later Golden Wall 1928, Willsolo 1934, Ohioan 1937, torpedoed and lost 1942
