= SS Empire Lifeguard =

Empire Lifeguard
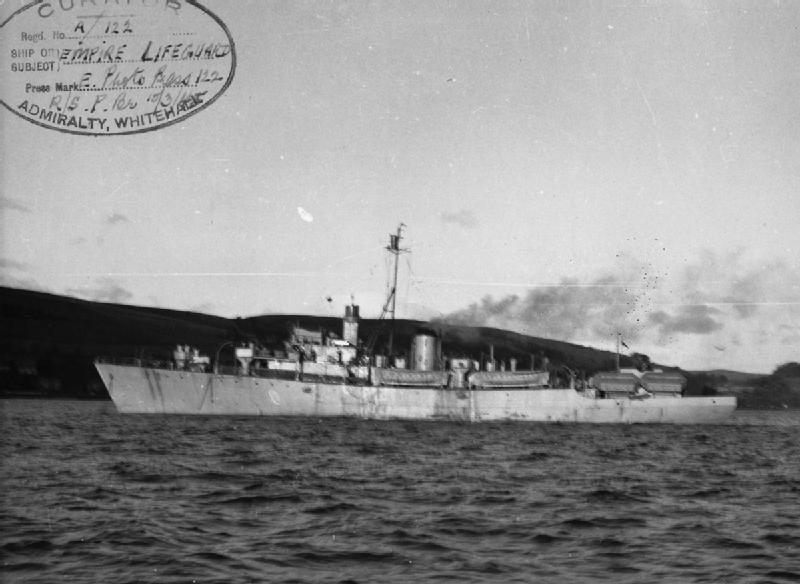
- HMS Empire Lifeguard anchored in 1944.

History

United Kingdom
- Name: Maiden Castle
- Namesake: Maiden Castle
- Owner: Ministry of War Transport
- Operator: Ellerman City Line
- Ordered: 9 December 1942
- Builder: Fleming and Ferguson, Paisley, Scotland
- Laid down: 1943
- Launched: 8 June 1944
- Completed: November 1944
- Out of service: 1947
- Renamed: Empire Lifeguard
- Identification: Pennant number: K443
- Fate: Scrapped, 22 June 1955

General characteristics
- Class & type: Castle-class corvette
- Displacement: 1,010 long tons (1,030 t) (standard); 1,510 long tons (1,530 t) (deep load)
- Length: 252 ft (76.8 m)
- Beam: 33 ft (10.1 m)
- Draught: 14 ft (4.3 m)
- Installed power: 2 Admiralty 3-drum boilers; 2,880 ihp (2,150 kW)
- Propulsion: 2 shafts, 2 geared steam turbines
- Speed: 16.5 knots (30.6 km/h; 19.0 mph)
- Range: 6,500 nmi (12,000 km; 7,500 mi) at 15 knots (28 km/h; 17 mph)
- Complement: 99
- Sensors & processing systems: Type 145 and Type 147 ASDIC; Type 277 search radar; HF/DF radio direction finder
- Armament: 1 × single QF 4 in (102 mm) gun; 2 × twin, 2 × single 20 mm (0.8 in) Oerlikon AA guns; 1 × 3-barrel Squid anti-submarine mortar; 15 × depth charges, 1 rack and 2 throwers

Empire Lifeguard (K443) was a convoy rescue ship of the Second World War. Initially built as HMS Maiden Castle - one of 44 Castle-class corvette built for the Royal Navy - she was completed in 1944 as a convoy rescue ship to pick up survivors from attacks on the convoys. Operated for the Ministry of War Transport (MoWT) she served in this role with convoys during the war. Post war she was operated as a transport in the Mediterranean. She was damaged by a terrorist attack and sunk in 1947 but repaired and ultimately sold for scrap in 1955.

== Design and description ==
The Castle-class corvette was a stretched version of the preceding Flower class, enlarged to improve seakeeping and to accommodate modern weapons. The ships displaced 1,010 long tons (1,030 t) at standard load and 1,510 long tons (1,530 t) at deep load. They had an overall length of 252 feet (76.8 m), a beam of 36 feet 9 inches (11.2 m) and a deep draught of 14 feet (4.3 m). They were powered by a pair of triple-expansion steam engines, each driving one propeller shaft using steam provided by two Admiralty three-drum boilers. The engines developed a total of 2,880 indicated horsepower (2,150 kW) and gave a maximum speed of 16.5 knots (30.6 km/h; 19.0 mph). The Castles carried enough fuel oil to give them a range of 6,500 nautical miles (12,000 km; 7,500 mi) at 15 knots (28 km/h; 17 mph). The ships' complement was 99 officers and ratings.

The Castle-class ships were equipped with a single QF 4-inch (102 mm) Mk XVI gun forward, but their primary weapon was their single three-barrel Squid anti-submarine mortar. This was backed up by one depth charge rail and two throwers for 15 depth charges. The ships were fitted with two twin and a pair of single mounts for 20-millimetre (0.8 in) Oerlikon light AA guns. Provision was made for a further four single mounts if needed. They were equipped with Type 145Q and Type 147B ASDIC sets to detect submarines by reflections from sound waves beamed into the water. A Type 277 search radar and a HF/DF radio direction finder rounded out the Castles' sensor suite.

== Construction and career ==
Maiden Castle was laid down by Fleming and Ferguson at their shipyard at Paisley, Scotland, in 1943 and launched on 8 June 1944. She was completed in November and served as a convoy escort until the end of the Second World War in May 1945. The ship was placed in reserve on 25 May. Maiden Castle was reactivated in November and assigned to the Fishery Protection Flotilla based at Fleetwood. In 1947 she returned to reserve. The ship was sold and arrived at Sunderland on 22 December 1955 to be broken up.

October 1945 reactivated to pick up the RN Shore Party at Murmansk and bring them back to the Clyde. She then sailed to Kiel and took another Naval party to Devonport.

Post war she served in Home fleet and the Mediterranean as an Army Transport, including the transport of Jewish refugees to Palestine. During its deployment in Palestine, it was used as a prison ship to bring Jewish immigrants from the Cyprus internment camps to Palestine.

== Sinking ==
On 23 July 1947, the ship was sunk in Haifa harbour with a bomb while discharging 259 Jewish Ma'apilim released from Cyprus detention camps to Palestine. The bombing was in response to the British interception of the SS Exodus, which resulted in the death of an American volunteer and two passengers.

The bombers were mainly American volunteers for the Haganah which crewed the SS HaTikva and were captured by the British two months prior, with them was one Haganah member from Palestine. The bomb parts were smuggled via a shaving cream tube, the handbag of a nurse while she was escorting a patient, and the anus of one of the Americans.

The bombers disguised as spouses in order to be placed in the same cage. One of the Americans had smuggled a handsaw on board, handing it to the Haganah member which used it to break the lock on a hatch in the cage. In order to silence the sounds of the sawing, the Americans began to sing.

Although they had brought a knife and prepared for a situation in which they would encounter British sailors as they were planting the bomb, they managed assemble the bomb without getting caught and returned to their cage. Two hours prior to their landing in Haifa, they returned to plant the detonator along with the bomb so it would detonate exactly when they reached Palestine without them needing to trigger it.

The ship anchored for ten minutes during the sailing. The bombers considered removing the detonator but the Haganah member which planted the bomb replied: "They taught me how to put it on. They didn’t tell me how to take it off." This lead the bombers to consider calling off the operation and inform the British about the bomb, but they had calmed down when the ship continued going forward.

As soon as the last of the immigrants came off the boat once it reached Haifa, the bomb went off. Claims of casualties vary between none to 19 British soldiers injured. The Americans were taken to the Athlit detainee camp and in retaliation for the bombing, the British began to charge the Jewish Agency a fee for every passenger sent to Cyprus.

The ship was later raised and scrapped on 22 June 1955.

== See also ==
- SS Empire Comfort
- SS Empire Peacemaker.
- SS Empire Rest
- SS Empire Shelter
