= List of Empire ships (L) =

== Suffix beginning with L ==
=== Empire Labrador ===
Empire Labrador was a 3,539 GRT cargo ship which was built by William Gray & Co Ltd, West Hartlepool. Launched on 19 August 1944 and completed in October 1944. Sold in 1949 to Williamson & Co Ltd, Hong Kong and renamed Incharran. Seized on 1 May 1950 by a Chinese Nationalist warship. She was released with the assistance of HMS Mounts Bay. On 12 February 1953 she was attacked by Chinese Nationalist warships when in the Strait of Formosa but evaded capture and safely reached Hong Kong. Sold in 1955 to Indo-China Steam Navigation Co Ltd, London and renamed Sunshine. Sold in 1968 to Golden River Shipping Corp. and renamed Golden River. Operated under the management of C T Chu, Hong Kong. Arrived on 7 April 1970 at Sakaide, Japan for scrapping.

=== Empire Labuan ===
Empire Labuan was a 7,339 GRT cargo ship which was built by William Gray & Co Ltd, West Hartlepool. Launched on 5 September 1944 as Empire Labuan and completed in November 1944 as HMS Holm Sound (F 189), an aircraft component repair and maintenance ship. Completed one wartime tour to Gibraltar, Malta, Port Said, Aden, Bombay, Cochin, Ceylon, Cocas Islands, Fremantle and return, in support of the Pacific fleet. Sold in 1949 to Aviation & Shipping Ltd and reconverted to a cargo ship, renamed Avisbay. Operated under the management of Purvis Shipping Co Ltd, London. Sold in 1950 to Elder Dempster Lines, Liverpool and renamed Prah. Sold in 1959 to Atlanska Plovidba, Yugoslavia and renamed Naprijed. Arrived on 13 May 1969 at Split for scrapping.

=== Empire Lad ===
Empire Lad was a 298 GRT coastal tanker which was built by Rowhedge Ironworks Ltd, Rowhedge, Essex. Launched on 10 July 1941 as Empire Garnet and completed in November 1941 as Empire Lad. Sold in 1946 to Anglo-American Oil Co Ltd and renamed Esso Suwanee Sold in 1951 to Esso Petroleum Co Ltd. Sold in 1960 to P L Den Breejen, Netherlands. Sold in 1963 to Compagnia Comercio Navigazione Alpes, Panama. Converted to carry dry cargo, now 331 GRT and renamed USA. Sold in 1966 to Autco SA, Panama and renamed Pejerey. Renamed Esterel in 1966. Sold in 1968 to Columbo Shipping Co, Panama and renamed Westerend. Sold in 1970 to Albina SA, Panama, renamed Sunrise then Grace. Sold in 1971 to D P Gousetis, Greece and renamed Captain Stelios. Sold in 1975 to C Dagadakis, Greece and renamed San Liberal. Sold in 1977 to E & G Kottis, Greece and renamed Kleopatra.

=== Empire Lady ===
Empire Lady was a 7,046 GRT cargo ship which was built by Shipbuilding Corporation Ltd, Newcastle upon Tyne. Launched on 20 June 1944 and completed in August 1944. Sold in 1946 to Royal Mail Lines Ltd and renamed Tweed. Arrived on 20 August 1959 at Newport Monmouthshire for scrapping.

=== Empire Lagan ===
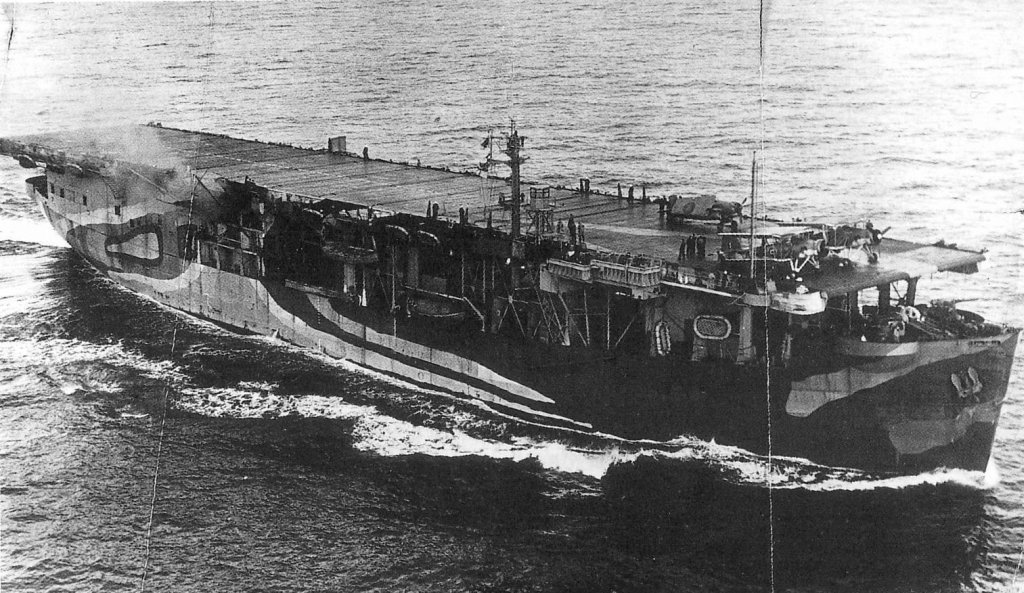
HMS Archer

Empire Lagan was an 11,399 GRT escort aircraft carrier which was built by Sun Shipbuilding & Drydock Co., Chester, Pennsylvania. Completed in April 1940 as Mormacland for Moore-McCormack Lines, Inc. Rebuilt in March 1941 by Newport News Shipbuilding & Drydock Company as an escort carrier with a capacity for twenty aircraft. Transferred on 17 November 1940 to the Royal Navy and renamed HMS Archer. On 13 January 1942 she was in collision with SS Brazos, which sank at 32°54′N 74°14′W. Archer was towed stern-first to Charleston, South Carolina for repairs. Decommissioned: 6 November 1943, Archer was relegated to a stores ship. Transferred in March 1945 to the MoWT and renamed Empire Lagan. Transferred in January 1946 to United States Maritime Commission (USMC) and laid up in Norfolk, Virginia. Sold in 1948 to Sven Salen, Stockholm and renamed Anna Salen. Operated under the management of Reder Pulp AB from 1949.

Refitted as a passenger ship with superstructure extended to the stern, and extra lifeboats, now 11,672 GRT. Sold in 1955 to Compagnia Navigazione Tasmania SA and renamed Tasmania. Operated under the management of Hellenic Mediterranean lines. Sold in 1961 to China Union Lines, Taipei. Converted to a cargo ship (now 7,638 GRT) and renamed Union Reliance. On 7 November 1961 she was involved in a collision with the Norwegian tanker MV Berean, which caught fire and exploded, then beached. Refloated on 9 November and towed to Galveston, Texas. Scrapped in March 1962 at New Orleans.

=== Empire Lagoon ===
Empire Lagoon was a 2,013 GRT collier which was built by Grangemouth Dockyard Co Ltd, Grangemouth. Launched on 15 March 1941 and completed in June 1941. Sold in 1946 to Hudson Steamship Co Ltd, London and renamed Hudson Bay. Scrapped in 1964 in Blyth, Northumberland.

=== Empire Lagos ===
Empire Lagos was a 7,058 GRT cargo ship which was built by Short Brothers Ltd, Sunderland. Laid down as Empire Lagos but launched on 31 October 1944 as HMS Solway Firth, an aircraft engine repair ship. Completed in 1947 by Amsterdam Drydock Company as a 7,339 GRT cargo ship. Sold to Skibs Kongsberg and renamed Kongsberg. Operated by A G Olsen, Norway. Sold in 1955 to Rederi A/B Borgtramp and renamed Olofsborg. Operated under the management of J A Zachariassen, Finland. Sold in 1959 to Polish Steamship Co, Szczecin and renamed Huta Florian. Arrived on 26 August 1971 at Bilbao, Spain for scrapping.

=== Empire Laird ===
Empire Laird was a 313 GRT collier which was built by Richard Dunston Ltd, Thorne, Yorkshire. Launched on 29 December 1942 and completed in July 1943. Sold in 1947 to A L Duggan & Co Ltd, Bristol and renamed Monkton Combe. Sold in 1950 to J Tyrrell, Arklow and renamed Halronell. On 22 October 1961 she became stranded on Black Rock, Rosslare. She broke in two on 23 October and sank.

=== Empire Lake ===
Empire Lake was a 2,852 GRT collier which was built by William Gray & Co Ltd, West Hartlepool. Launched on 30 January 1941 and completed in March 1941. Torpedoed by U-181 on 15 July 1943 and sunk at 21°27′S 51°47′E.

=== Empire Lakeland ===
Empire Lakeland was a 7,015 GRT cargo ship that was built by John Readhead & Sons Ltd, South Shields. Launched on 14 September 1942 and completed that November. She was managed by Blue Star Line. Torpedoed on 11 March 1943 and sunk by U-190 while a member of Convoy SC 121.

=== Empire Lambeth ===
Empire Lambeth was a 2,250 GRT collier which was built by John Crown & Sons Ltd, Sunderland. Launched on 15 July 1946 as Empire Lambeth and completed in September 1946 as Dashwood for William France, Fenwick & Co Ltd. Scrapped in June 1961 at Hendrik-Ido-Ambacht, Netherlands.

=== Empire Lance ===
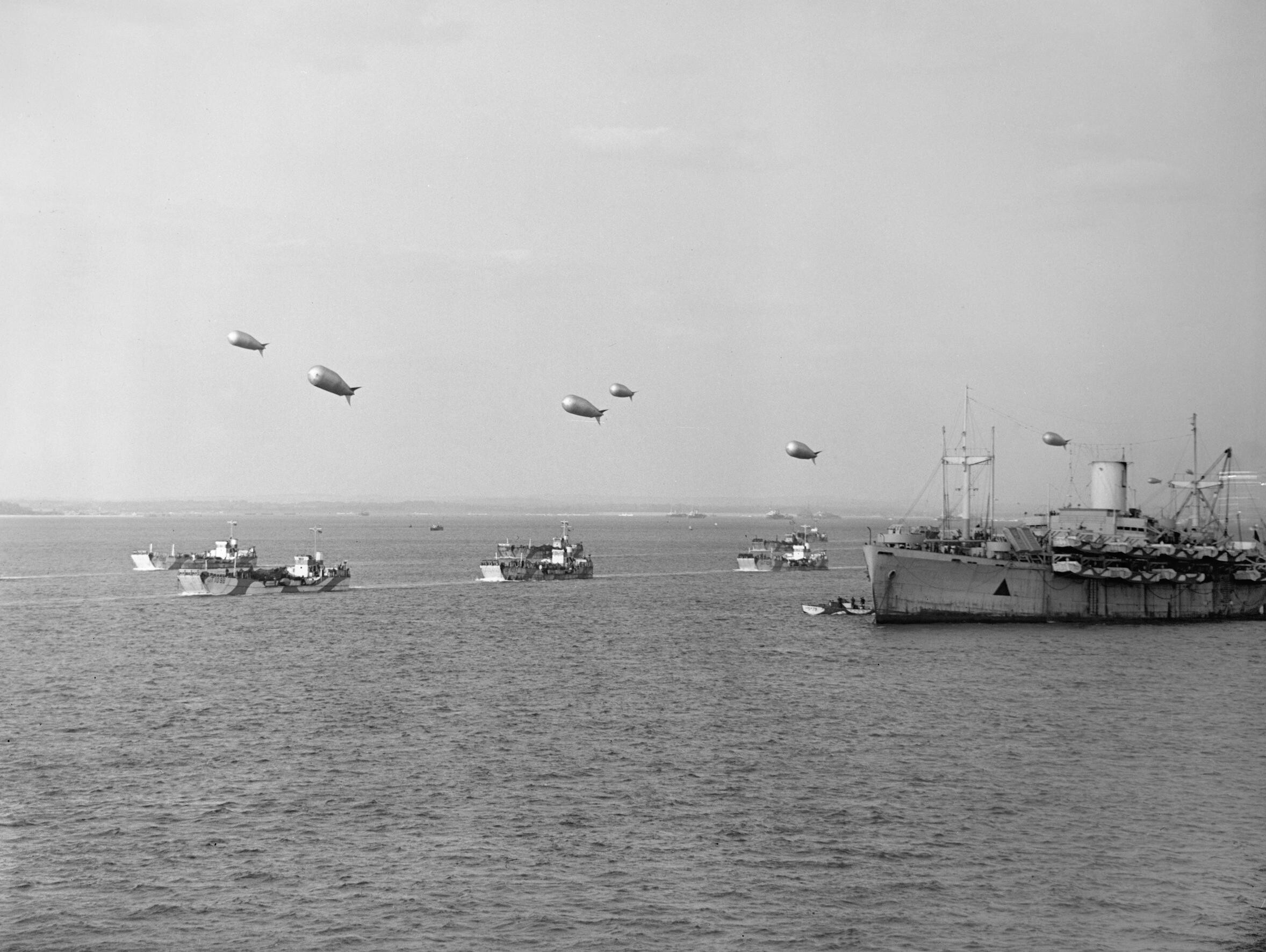
Empire Lance

Empire Lance was a 7,177 GRT (11,650 tons displacement) Type C1-S-AY-1 cargo ship which was built by Consolidated Steel Corporation, Wilmington, California. Laid down as Cape Pine and completed in December 1943 as Empire Lance for the MoWT. To the Royal Navy in 1945 as HMS Sir Hugo, then reverted to MoWT and renamed Empire Lance later that year. To USMC in 1949 and renamed Cape Pine. Renamed Imperial Lance at an unknown date. Scrapped in December 1966 at Baltimore.

=== Empire Lancer ===
Empire Lancer was a 7,037 GRT cargo ship which was built by Lithgows Ltd, Port Glasgow. Launched on 31 August 1942 and completed in November 1942. Torpedoed on 16 August 1944 by U-862 and sunk in the Mozambique Channel.

=== Empire Lankester ===
Empire Lankester was a 7,067 GRT cargo ship which was built by William Gray & Co Ltd, West Hartlepool. Launched on 24 February 1944 and completed in April 1944. She transported troops to Normandy shortly after D-Day and then returned to MOWT duty. From August 1944 to March 1946 her Master was James Davidson. Sold in 1948 to Clan Line Steamers Ltd and renamed Clan Mackellar. Sold in 1961 to Mullion & Co Ltd, Gibraltar and renamed Ardgroom. Sold in 1966, due to be renamed Nearco but arrived on 20 February 1967 at Hong Kong for scrapping.

=== Empire Lantern ===
Empire Lantern was a 6,854 GRT cargo ship which was built by Hong Kong & Whampoa Dock Co Ltd, Hong Kong. Laid down on 26 May 1941 as Empire Lantern. Seized by the Japanese while under construction, launched on 8 December 1942 as Gyokurei Maru. Torpedoed and sunk by USS Grayback on 18 September 1944, at 35°05′N 124°24′E.

=== Empire Lapwing ===
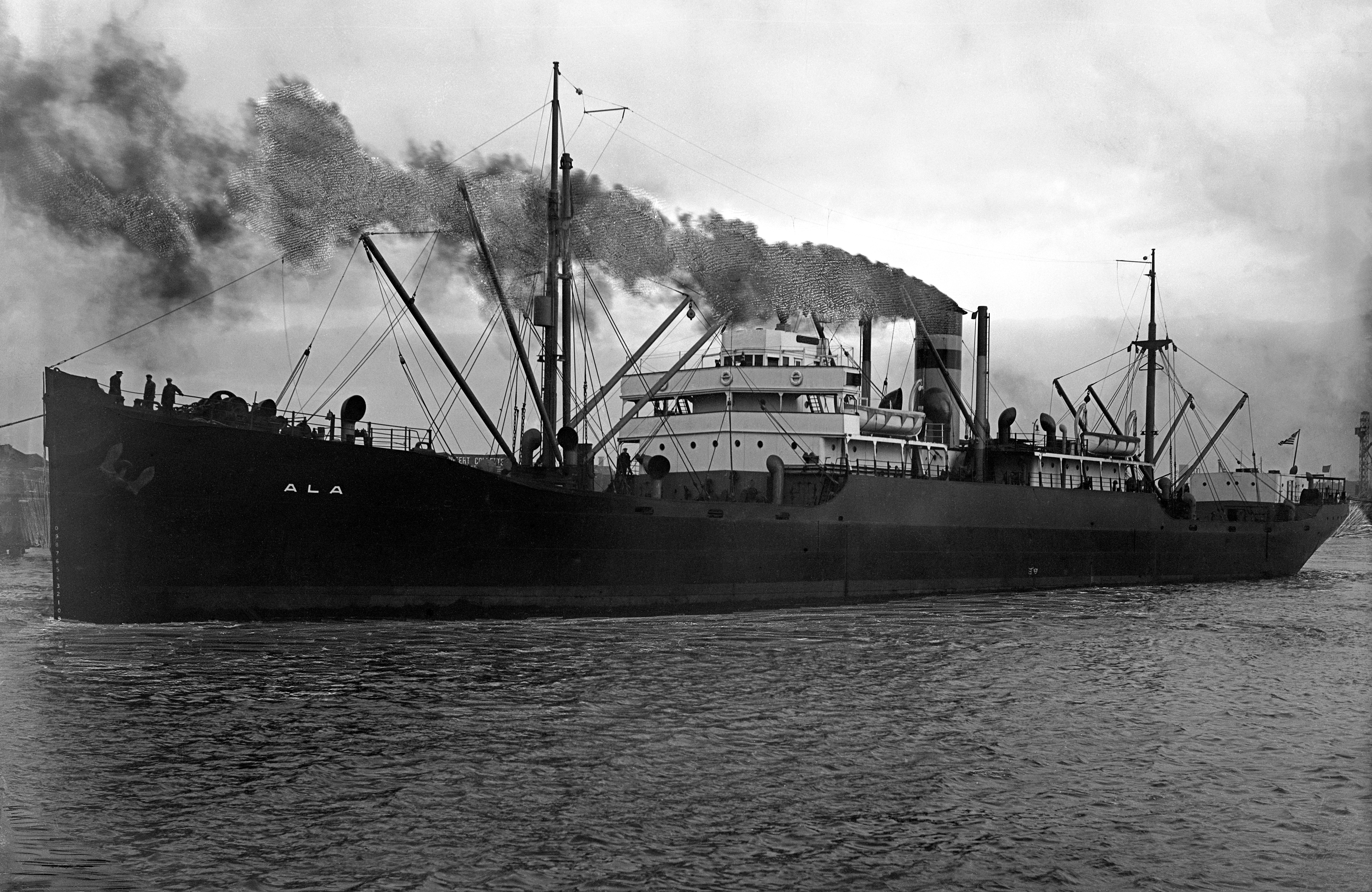
Ala, which was renamed Empire Lapwing

Empire Lapwing was a 5,358 GRT cargo ship that was built by the Merchant Shipbuilding Corporation, Harriman, Pennsylvania. Completed in 1921 as Ala for the United States Shipping Board (USSB). Bought by American Diamond Lines in 1931, which became Black Diamond Lines, and in 1935 renamed the ship Black Condor. Bought by MoWT in 1941 and renamed Empire Lapwing. Allocated in 1942 to the Belgian Government and renamed Belgian Fighter. Torpedoed on 9 October 1942 by U-68, and sunk at 35°00′S 18°30′E.

=== Empire Larch ===
Empire Larch was a 487 GRT tug which was built by Goole Shipbuilding & Repairing Co Ltd, Goole. Launched on 30 January 1941 and completed in June 1941. The ship was operated by the Hull-based United Towing Co. on behalf of the owners (MoWT) and was armed under the DEMS programme. Damaged on 30 June 1941 by enemy aircraft bombing off Great Yarmouth, later repaired. Departed Aberdeen on 16 February 1942 with Empire Pilgrim in tow, bound for Blyth, Northumberland. Was towing tug TID 12 on 9 August 1943 when she broke free and went aground at Tarlair Point, Macduff, Banffshire. In April 1944 she was assigned to "Operation Corncob" in preparation for the coming invasion of France and sailed from Hull to join the convoy which collected the vessels which were to be used as blockships to form the breakwater for the Mulberry Harbour. On 6 June 1944 she crossed the channel from Poole to join the Normandy invasion fleet and arrived in the evening off Arromanches (Gold Beach) and assisted in positioning and scuttling the blockships. She ran aground on the morning of 7 June (while still under artillery fire from a German shore battery) and was towed off a sandbar by a US Navy tug. She assisted tug Thames in the tow of Empire Beatrice from Tilbury to Glasgow in April 1945. Sold in 1946 to United Towing Co Ltd (who had managed her under contract from the MoWT during the war) and renamed Masterman. She was sold in 1962 to Brodospas, Yugoslavia and renamed Smjeli. She departed Cape Town, South Africa on 9 December 1962 with Marianella on tow, bound for Genoa to be scrapped. She was scrapped in 1972 in Split. This ship's role in the D-Day landings is the subject of the song 'Shores of Normandy' written by her then Galley Boy (Jim Radford, the youngest participant in the Allied invasion force) and performed by him three times in the Royal Albert Hall in 2014 for the D-Day 70th-anniversary commemorations.

=== Empire Lark ===
Empire Lark was a 4,971 GRT cargo ship which was built by Deutsche Werke, Kiel. Launched in 1921 as Martha Hemsoth. Sold in 1926 to Hanseatische Reederei, Hamburg and renamed Kersten Miles. Arrived on 27 October 1939 at Las Palmas with machinery damage while carrying a cargo of wheat from Argentina to Germany. Interned at Las Palmas, seized in May 1945 as a war prize. To MoWT and renamed Empire Lark. Scuttled on 17 July 1947 at 47°55′N 08°25′W with a cargo of 7,669 tons of chemical ammunition and 20 tons of contaminated earth.

=== Empire Lass ===
Empire Lass was an 813 GRT (850 DWT) coastal tanker which was built by Grangemouth Dockyard Co Ltd, Grangemouth. Launched on 31 July 1941 and completed in January 1942. Sold in 1946 to Anglo-American Oil Co Ltd and renamed Esso Juniata. Sold in 1956 to F T Everard & Sons Ltd and renamed Argosity. Lengthened in 1957 to 230 feet 5 inches (70.23 m), now 877 GRT. Arrived on 3 May 1969 at Bruges, Belgium for scrapping.

=== Empire Latimer ===
Empire Latimer was a 7,244 GRT cargo ship which was built by William Doxford & Sons Ltd, Sunderland. Launched on 14 August 1941 and completed in December 1941. Allocated in 1942 to the Norwegian Government and renamed Kronprinsessen. Sold in 1946 to E Rasmussen, Norway and renamed Polytrader. Sold in 1962 to Marenviado Compagnia Navigazione and renamed Flora M. Operated under the management of L G Matsas, Greece. Arrived on 27 December 1968 at Mihara, Japan for scrapping.

=== Empire Launcelot ===
Empire Launcelot was a 2,890 GRT cargo ship which was built by Ailsa Shipbuilding Co Ltd, Troon, Ayrshire. Launched on 13 August 1942 and completed in October 1942. Allocated in 1943 to the Belgian Government and renamed Belgian Trader. Sold in 1946 to Armement Deppe SA, Belgium and renamed Ostende. Sold in 1954 to H Stinnes, Germany and renamed Kettwig. Sold in 1963 to Monson Schiffs MBH & Co AG, Germany. Sold in 1965 to Compagnia de Navigazione Saborga SA and renamed Honda. Operated under the management of N Paletta, Italy. Scrapped in 1974 in Split, Yugoslavia.

=== Empire Law ===
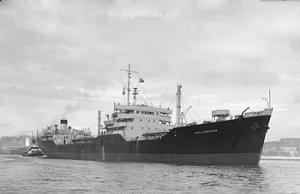
RFA Wave Conqueror

Empire Law was an 8,127 GRT tanker which was built by Furness Shipbuilding, Haverton Hill-on-Tees. Launched on 27 November 1943 and completed in March 1944. To Royal Fleet Auxiliary in 1946 and renamed RFA Wave Conqueror. Sold in 1958 to H G Pounds, Portsmouth. Used as an oil hulk at Le Havre. Departed Le Havre under tow on 6 April 1960 and arrived on 23 April 1960 at Spezia, Italy for scrapping.

=== Empire Lawn ===
Empire Lawn was a 254 GRT tug which was built by Ferguson Brothers Ltd Port Glasgow. Launched on 1 April 1942 and completed in May 1942. To the Admiralty in 1947 and renamed Masterful. Sold in 1958 to Marittime Augustea SpA, Italy and renamed Sanantonio. Sold in 1968 to Societa Rim. Napoletani, Italy. Scrapped in March 1981 in Naples.

=== Empire Lawrence ===
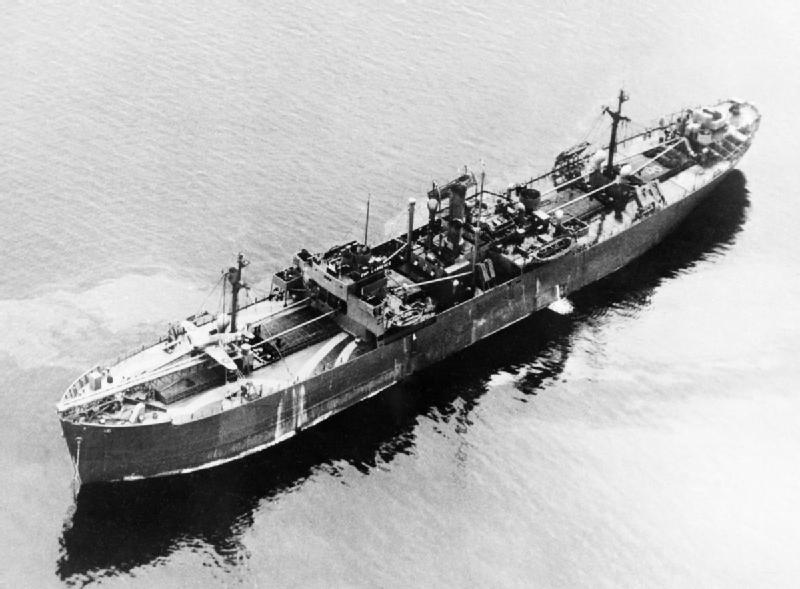
Empire Lawrence

Empire Lawrence was a 7,457 GRT CAM ship which was built by J L Thompson & Sons Ltd, Sunderland. Launched on 10 June 1941 and completed in September 1941. Bombed on 27 May 1942 and sunk by German aircraft east of Bear Island (74°00′N 25°10′E) while a member of Convoy PQ 16.

=== Empire Lea ===
Empire Lea was a 2,563 GRT cargo ship which was built by Nakskov Skibs Akt., Nakskov. Launched in 1942 as Karin K Bornhofen for R Bornhofen, Hamburg. Seized in May 1945 at Copenhagen. To MoWT and renamed Empire Lea. Allocated in 1946 to USSR and renamed Verkhoyansk. On shipping registers until 1970.

=== Empire Leech ===
Empire Leech was a 363 GRT coastal tanker which was built by J Smit, Alblasserdam, Netherlands. Launched in 1929 as Escaut for William Muller & Co, Netherlands. Attacked on 25 March 1941 by German aircraft off north Cornwall. Beached at Cleave Strand, Crackington Haven, but her cargo of coal burned for four weeks. Refloated, salvaged and repaired. To MoWT and renamed Empire Leech. Sold in 1948 to William Muller & Co, Netherlands and renamed Seine. On 17 July 1955 she was in collision with Russian tanker Drogobitz off Dungeness, Kent and sank.

=== Empire Leonard ===
Empire Leonard was a 235 GRT tug which was built by A Hall & Co Ltd, Aberdeen. Launched on 5 May 1946 and completed in September 1946 as Sun XVI for W H J Alexander Ltd. Sold in 1962 to Societa Rim. Napoletani, Italy and renamed S Cataldo. Scrapped in 1983 in Naples.

=== Empire Leopard ===
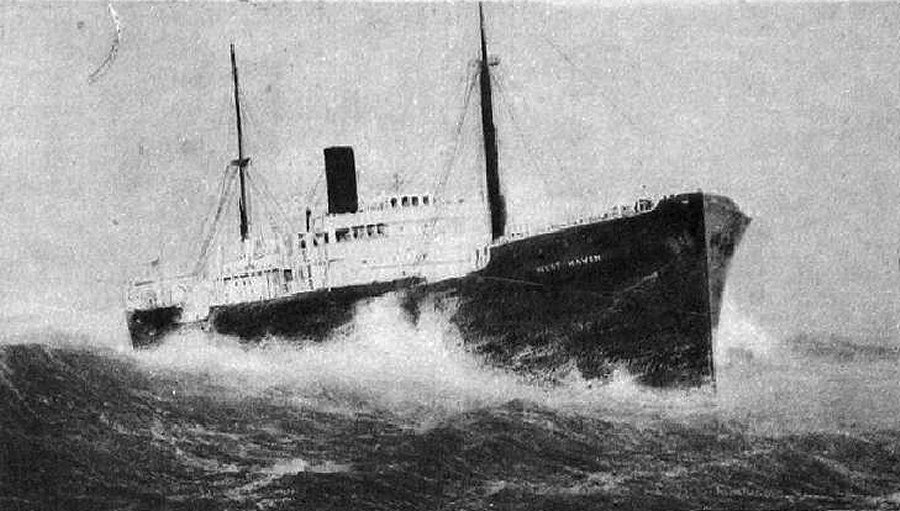
SS West Haven

Empire Leopard was a 5,676 GRT cargo ship which was built by Skinner & Eddy Corp, Seattle. Completed in December 1917 as West Haven for USSB. To the United States Navy in 1918, returned to USSB in 1920, then to Atlantic Gulf Pacific Steamship Co later that year. Returned to USSB in 1922. To Los Angeles Steamship Co Inc, Los Angeles in 1929 and renamed Marian Otis Chandler. To MoWT in 1940 and renamed Empire Leopard. Torpedoed on 2 November 1942 by U-402 and sunk at 52°26′N 45°22′W while a member of Convoy SC 107.

=== Empire Lethe ===
Empire Lethe was a 369 GRT coaster which was built by R Williamson & Son, Workington. Launched in 1891 as Black Rock. Sold in 1913 to William Thomas & Sons Ltd, Liverpool and renamed Eleth. To MoWT in 1941 and renamed Empire Lethe. To William Thomas & Sons in 1946 and renamed Eleth. Capsized on 1 February 1951 and sank 12 nautical miles (22 km) east of Carlingford, Republic of Ireland.

=== Empire Lewis ===
Empire Lewis was a 138 GRT tug which was built by R Dunston Ltd, Thorne. Launched on 29 May 1943 and completed in August 1943. Sold in 1947 to the Cypriot Government and renamed Desdemona. Sold in 1987 to a Turkish buyer and renamed Kaptan Dursun.

=== Empire Lewisham ===
Empire Lewisham was a 1,059 GRT coaster which was built by George Brown & Co (Marine) Ltd, Greenock. Launched on 27 November 1945 and completed in February 1946. Sold in 1946 to J Hay & Sons Ltd, Glasgow and renamed The Monarch. Sold in 1962 to P Vrangos, Greece and renamed Silver Cloud under the Lebanese flag. Renamed Chrysanthi at an unknown date. Scrapped in September 1968 at Eleusina, Greece.

=== Empire Liberty ===
Empire Liberty was the prototype Liberty ship. She was a 7,157 GRT cargo ship which was built by J L Thompson & Sons Ltd, Sunderland. Launched on 23 August 1941 and completed in November 1941. Allocated in 1943 to the Greek Government and renamed Kyklades. Sold in 1947 to H C Dracoulis, Greece and renamed Mentor. Scrapped in October 1960 in Osaka, Japan.

=== Empire Liddell ===
Empire Liddell was a 1,425 GRT cargo ship which was built by W Harkness & Sons Ltd, Middlesbrough. Launched in 1920 as Enugu for the Nigerian Government. To MoWT in 1943 and renamed Empire Liddell. Sold in 1946 to Arden Hall Steamship Co Ltd, Cape Town and renamed Hoeveld. Sold in 1951 to South African National Steamship Co, Cape Town and renamed Aliwal. Scrapped in January 1961 at Durban, South Africa.

=== Empire Life ===
Empire Life was a 9,879 GRT cargo ship which was built by Caledon Shipbuilding & Engineering Co Ltd, Dundee. Launched on 12 January 1945 by Lord Westwood and completed in May 1945. Sold in 1946 to the Union-Castle Mail Steamship Co Ltd and renamed Good Hope Castle. Arrived on 14 July 1959 at Hong Kong for scrapping.

=== Empire Lifeguard ===
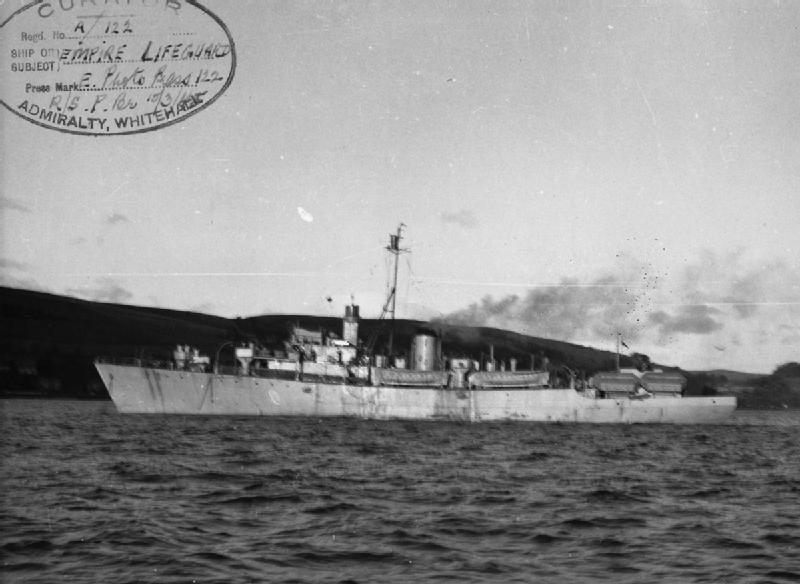
Empire Lifeguard

Empire Lifeguard was a 1,333 GRT convoy rescue ship which was built by Fleming & Ferguson Ltd, Paisley. Launched on 8 June 1944 as Castle-class corvette HMS Maiden Castle for the Royal Navy. Completed in November 1944 as Empire Lifeguard for MoWT. On 23 July 1947 she was holed at Haifa, Palestine by Limpet Mines attached to her hull in Famagusta, Cyprus. She was refloated on 8 August 1947 and towed to Port Said, Egypt for dry-docking. She caught fire three times during repairs, which were completed in September 1947. Laid up at Falmouth, Cornwall about 1954. Reached Antwerp, Belgium on 22 July 1955 for scrapping, towed by ST Marinia.

=== Empire Light (1940) ===
Empire Light was a 6,828 GRT cargo ship built by Barclay, Curle & Co in Glasgow. She was launched on 5 July 1940, and completed that September. The German auxiliary cruiser Pinguin sank her by shellfire on 25 April 1941, off the Seychelles at about 02°00′S 61°00′E.

=== Empire Light (1942) ===
Empire Light was a 6,537 GRT tanker which was built by J Brown & Co Ltd, Clydebank. Launched in 1925 as Lumen for H E Moss & Co Ltd, Liverpool. Collided on 9 April 1942 with the Dutch flagged SS Spar in the River Tyne. Repaired, to MoWT and renamed Empire Light. Torpedoed on 7 March 1943 and sunk by U-468 at 53°57′N 46°14′W.

=== Empire Lightning ===
Empire Lightning was a 6,942 GRT cargo ship which was built by Short Brothers Ltd, Sunderland. Launched on 4 September 1941 and completed in January 1941. On 7 October 1942, she was in collision with British-flagged SS Milcrest, which sank. Empire Lightning put into Halifax, Nova Scotia with bow damage for repairs. Sold in 1946 to Hall Brothers Steamship Co Ltd, Newcastle upon Tyne and renamed Trident. Arrived on 9 November 1959 at Osaka, Japan for scrapping.

=== Empire Lilliput ===
Empire Lilliput was a 138 GRT tug which was built by R Dunston Ltd, Thorne. Launched on 10 November 1943 and completed in January 1944. Sold in 1947 to Shell Company of Singapore Ltd and renamed Lembu. Scrapped in September 1958 in Singapore.

=== Empire Lily ===
Empire Lily was a 325 GRT coaster which was built by I Pimblott & Sons Ltd, Northwich, Cheshire. Launched on 29 January 1942 and completed in June 1942. Allocated in 1946 to the Dutch Government and renamed Pampus. Sold later that year to L Tercy, France and renamed Petit Frere. New diesel engine fitted in 1953. Sold in 1962 to A Veroutis & Co, Greece and renamed Dedalos. Sold in 1964 to S D Voudouris & Syriggas, Greece and renamed Nikiforos. Sold in 1973 to Beekman Line SA, Greece and renamed Gagnant. On shipping registers in 1988 but owner not specified, thought to have been scrapped about this time.

=== Empire Linden ===
Empire Linden was a 244 GRT tug which was built by Henry Scarr Ltd, Hessle. Launched on 24 September 1941 and completed in December 1941. Loaned in 1944 to Kenya & Uganda Railways & Harbours Administration, Mombasa. Chartered in 1945 to British Petroleum Co Ltd, Bandar Mashur. Sold in 1948 to Tanganyika Railways & Harbours Administration, Dar es Salaam. Sold in 1956 to East African Railways & Harbours Administration, Dar es Salaam and renamed Linden. Sold in 1974 to Marino Engineering Works, Kenya. Scrapped in September 1983 at Mombasa, Kenya.

=== Empire Lionel ===
Empire Lionel was a 7,012 GRT cargo ship which was built by William Gray & Co Ltd, West Hartlepool. Launched on 2 May 1942 and completed in June 1942. Sold in 1945 to Pool Shipping Co Ltd and renamed Levenpool. Operated under the management of Sir R Ropner & Co Ltd. Sold in 1962 to Trafalgar Steamship Co Ltd and renamed Newlane. Operated under the management of Tsavliris Shipping Ltd, London. Sold in 1968 to Kantara Shipping Ltd, Cyprus and then in 1969 to Newlane Shipping Ltd, Cyprus, still under Tsavliris's management. Arrived on 23 October 1969 at Chittagong, India for scrapping.

=== Empire Livingstone ===
Empire Livingstone was a 6,997 GRT cargo ship which was built by Lithgows Ltd, Port Glasgow. Launched on 24 July 1941 and completed in October 1941. Ran ashore on 31 December 1943 at Bizerta, Tunisia. Declared a total loss and scrapped in situ.

=== Empire Lizard ===
Empire Lizard was a 1,749 GRT tanker which was built by Bertram Engine Works, Toronto, Ontario. Launched in 1904 as cargo ship Haddington, renamed Maplehill in 1914. Sold in 1937 for scrapping but bought by Branch Lines Ltd, Montreal and converted to a tanker. Renamed Oakbranch. To MoWT in 1945 and renamed Empire Lizard. Sold in 1947 to Bulk Storage Co Ltd and renamed Basingbrook. Scrapped in 1949 in Sunderland.

=== Empire Lola ===
Empire Lola was a 292 GRT tug which was built by George Brown & Co (Marine) Ltd, Greenock. Launched on 5 March 1946 and completed in April 1943. To the Admiralty in 1947 and renamed Justice. Sold in 1951 to the Government of Bermuda. Sunk as a gunnery target off Bermuda on 21 July 1967 by HMS Leander.

=== Empire Longford ===
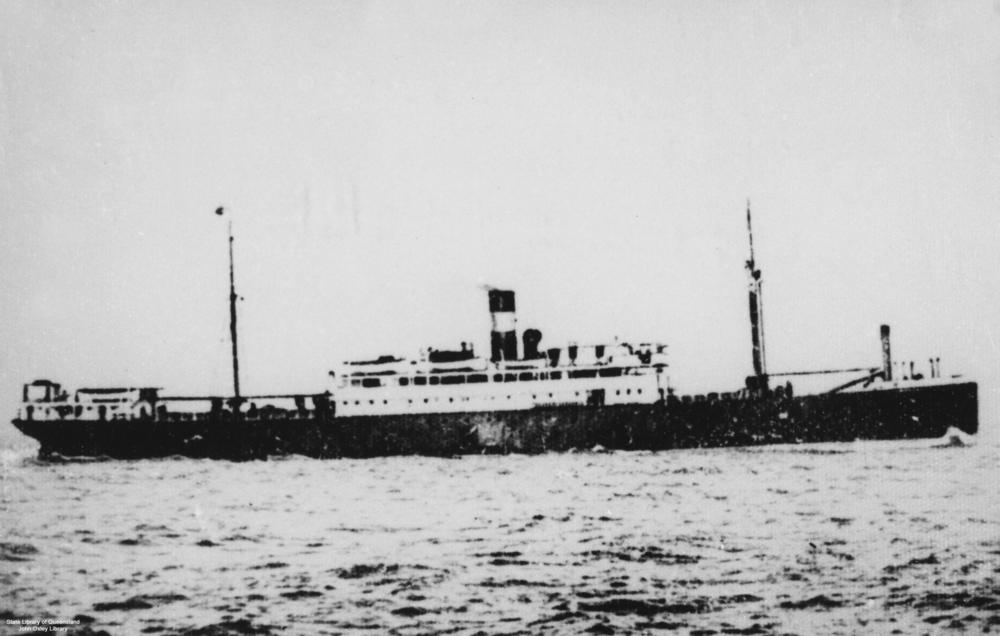
Dimboola, later Empire Langford

Empire Longford was a 3,703 GRT cargo ship which was built by Swan, Hunter & Wigham Richardson Ltd, Newcastle upon Tyne. Launched in 1912 as Dimboola for Melbourne Steamship Co. Sold in 1935 to Ho Hong Steamship Co, Singapore and renamed Hong Siang. To Ministry of Transport in 1951 and renamed Empire Longford. Acquired by the military in 1951 and renamed Empire Longford, she carried stores from Singapore to Korea and between Korea and Japan. She was also used on at least one occasion to carry troops from Pusan to Inchon even though not designed to carry passengers. She was sailed to the UK and scrapped in 1953 in Dover, Kent.

=== Empire Longstone ===
Empire Longstone was a 7,301 GRT cargo ship which was built by Shipbuilding Corporation Ltd, Newcastle upon Tyne. Launched on 2 May 1946 and completed in August 1946 as Hesperides for Houston Line Ltd. Sold in 1960 to Clan Line Steamers Ltd and renamed Clan Murray. Scrapped in September 1962 in Osaka, Japan.

=== Empire Lord ===
Empire Lord was a 7,359 GRT cargo ship which was built by William Doxford & Sons Ltd, Sunderland. Launched on 11 October 1943 and completed in February 1944. Sold in 1946 to United British Steamship Co Ltd and renamed Aldington Court. Operated under the management of Haldin & Co Ltd. Sold in 1959 to Cosmar Shipping Corporation, Liberia and renamed Anacreon. Sold in 1966 to Garden City Shipping Co Inc, Panama and renamed White Daisy. Operated under the management of F Italo Groce, Italy. Sold in 1968 to Compagnia Navigazione Rivabella SA, Panama and renamed Robertina. Operated under the management of World Shipping SA. On 15 June 1970, she sprang a leak off Cape Palmas, Liberia. Beached 2 nautical miles (3.7 km) west of Cape Garraway, Liberia but a constructive total loss.

=== Empire Lorenzo ===
Empire Lorenzo was a 2,865 GRT cargo ship which was built by William Gray & Co Ltd, West Hartlepool. Launched on 25 September 1942 and completed in December 1942. Sold in 1946 to Hogarth Shipping Co Ltd and renamed Baron Elcho. Operated under the management of H Hoparth and Sons. Sold in 1951 to Compagnia Maritime Ircar SA, Liberia and renamed Kismet II. Ran aground on 25 November 1955 at Cape Breton Island (47°05′N 60°03′W) and abandoned as a total loss.

=== Empire Lotus ===
Empire Lotus was a 3,683 GRT cargo ship which was built by Ropner & Sons, Stockton on Tees. Launched in 1920 as Alness. Sold in 1933 to Alexandria Navigation Co, Egypt and renamed Star of Ramleh. To MoWT in 1940 and renamed Empire Lotus. Operated under the management of Glover Bros (London) Ltd Foundered on 12 April 1942 in the Atlantic while in convoy SC79 from Halifax NS at 44°06′N 60°27′W.

=== Empire Lough ===
Empire Lough was a 2,824 GRT collier which was built by William Gray & Co Ltd, West Hartlepool. Launched on 1 October 1940 and completed in December 1940. Intercepted on 24 June 1944 by German E-boats in the English Channel and set on fire. Beached near Folkestone but a total loss.

=== Empire Lowlander ===
Empire Lowlander was a 2,160 GRT collier which was built by John Crown & Sons Ltd, Sunderland. Launched on 4 March 1946 and completed in June 1946 as Corflow for William Cory & Son Ltd. Sold in 1959 to G Vlassis & Co, Greece. Capsized on 25 December 1969 and sank at 37°37′N 24°02′E.

=== Empire Lucy ===
Empire Lucy was a 242 GRT tug which was built by J S Watson Ltd, Gainsborough. Launched on 6 March 1946 and completed in June 1946. Sold in 1962 to Impresa Marittima Augustea, Italy and renamed Ohnina. Transferred to the Marina Militare in 1972.

=== Empire Lugard ===
Empire Lugard was a 7,241 GRT cargo ship which was built by William Doxford & Sons Ltd, Sunderland. Launched on 28 April 1941 and completed in September 1941. Torpedoed on 13 September 1942 and sunk by U-558 at 12°07′N 63°32′W while a member of Convoy TAG 5.

=== Empire Lundy ===
Empire Lundy was a 288 GRT (300 DWT) coaster which was built by J Harker Ltd, Knottingley, Yorkshire. Launched on 11 April 1944 and complete in August 1944. Sold in 1946 to Skibs A/S Scot and renamed Scot. Operated under the management of L Lauritsen, Norway. Sold in 1947 to Shell h/f, Iceland and renamed Skeljungur. Sold in 1956 to Bowker & King Ltd, London and renamed Bannister. Removed from shipping register in 1967.

=== Empire Lune ===
Empire Lune was a 2,837 GRT cargo ship which was built by Nakskov Skibs Akt, Nakskov. Launched in 1943 as Millerntor for Hamburg America Line. Completed at Lübeck in 1945 by Lübecker Flenderwerke AG. Seized in May 1945 at Flensburg. To MoWT and renamed Empire Lune. Allocated in 1947 to the United States, sold to Sword Line Inc. New York and renamed Alabama Sword. Renamed Texas Sword in 1951. Sold in 1956 to Compagnia de Ultramar SA, Liberia and renamed Zephyr. Ran aground on 10 November 1962 at Gladden Spit, British Honduras (16°32′N 87°59′W). Caught fire on 17 November but the fire was later extinguished. Refloated on 27 November and declared a total constructive loss. Sold and repaired, sold in 1964 to Transcontinental Shipping Corp, Liberia and renamed Carina. Sold in 1966 to Astronato Compagnia Navigazione, Liberia and renamed Sapho I. Sold in 1967 to Marvigor Compagnia Navigazione, Liberia. Scrapped in March 1970 at Karachi, Pakistan.

=== Empire Lynx ===
Empire Lynx was a 6,032 GRT cargo ship which was built by Texas Steamship Co, Bath, Maine. completed in October 1917 as Maine for USSB. To Green Star Steamship Corp, USA in 1920, returned to USSB in 1921. To C Barnes, USA in 1922 and Fairfield Steamship Corp in 1923, Operated under the management of Seas Shipping Company, New York. To MoWT in 1940 and renamed Empire Lynx. Torpedoed on 3 November 1942 and sunk by U-132 at 55°20′N 40°01′W while a member of Convoy SC 107.

=== Empire Lytton ===
Empire Lytton was a 9,807 GRT tanker which was built by Furness Shipbuilding Co Ltd, Haverton Hill-on-Tees. Launched on 16 June 1942 and completed in August 1942. Torpedoed on 9 January 1943 by U-442 and sunk at 28°08′N 28°20′W while a member of Convoy TM 1.

== See also ==
The above entries give a precis of each ship's history. For a fuller account see the linked articles.

== Sources ==
- Mitchell, WH; Sawyer, LA (1990). The Empire Ships (Second ed.). London, New York, Hamburg, Hong Kong: Lloyd's of London Press. ISBN 1-85044-275-4.
