= List of Empire ships (Sa–Sh) =

== Suffix beginning with S ==
=== Empire Sailor ===
Empire Sailor was a 6,068 GRT cargo ship built by Stabilimento Technico Triestino, Trieste. Completed in 1926 as Cellina for Società Italia di Navigazione, Genoa. Seized as a war prize on 10 June 1940 at Gibraltar. To MoWT and renamed Empire Sailor. Torpedoed on 21 November 1942 and sunk by U-518 at 43°55′N 55°12′W while a member of Convoy ON 145.

=== Empire Salerno ===
Empire Salerno was an 877 GRT coaster which was built by Earles Shipbuilding Co Ltd, Hull. Completed in 1920 as Salerno for Ellerman Wilson Lines. Seized on 15 April 1940 in Saudafjord. Renamed Markirch and impressed into service with the Kriegsmarine for use as a target towing vessel for the torpedo school at Eckernförde. Seized in May 1945 at Eckernförde, to MoWT and renamed Empire Salerno. Prize Court ordered her return to her original owners. To Ellerman Wilson Line in October 1946 and renamed Salerno. Sold in 1957 to M A Karageorgis, Greece and renamed Taxiarchis. Ran aground on 18 December 1958 on a reef between Kos and the Turkish mainland. Refloated on 23 December and proceeded to Kos, then towed to Piraeus. Repairs uneconomic, scrapped in August 1959 at Perama, Greece.

=== Empire Salisbury ===
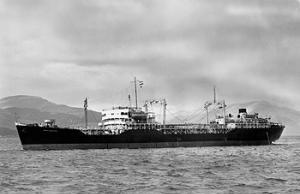
RFA Wave Master

Empire Salisbury was an 8,199 GRT tanker which was built by Sir J Laing & Sons Ltd, Sunderland. Launched on 20 May 1944 and completed in December 1944. To Royal Fleet Auxiliary in December 1946 and renamed Wave Master. Arrived under tow in April 1963 at Jurong, Singapore for scrapping.

=== Empire Sally ===
Empire Sally was a 257 GRT tug which was built by John Crown & Sons Ltd, Sunderland. Launched on 18 September 1945 and completed in November 1945. Sold in 1947 to Petroleum Steamship Co Ltd, London and renamed Daneshmand. Sold in 1958 to BP Tanker Co Ltd. Sold in 1972 to Gulf Shipping Co, Iran and renamed Danesh. Collided with Arya Tab and barge Gulf 107 on 20 January 1975 and sank in Khor Musa Channel, Khorramshahr, Iran. Constructive total loss, wreck later salvaged and scrapped.

=== Empire Salmonpool ===
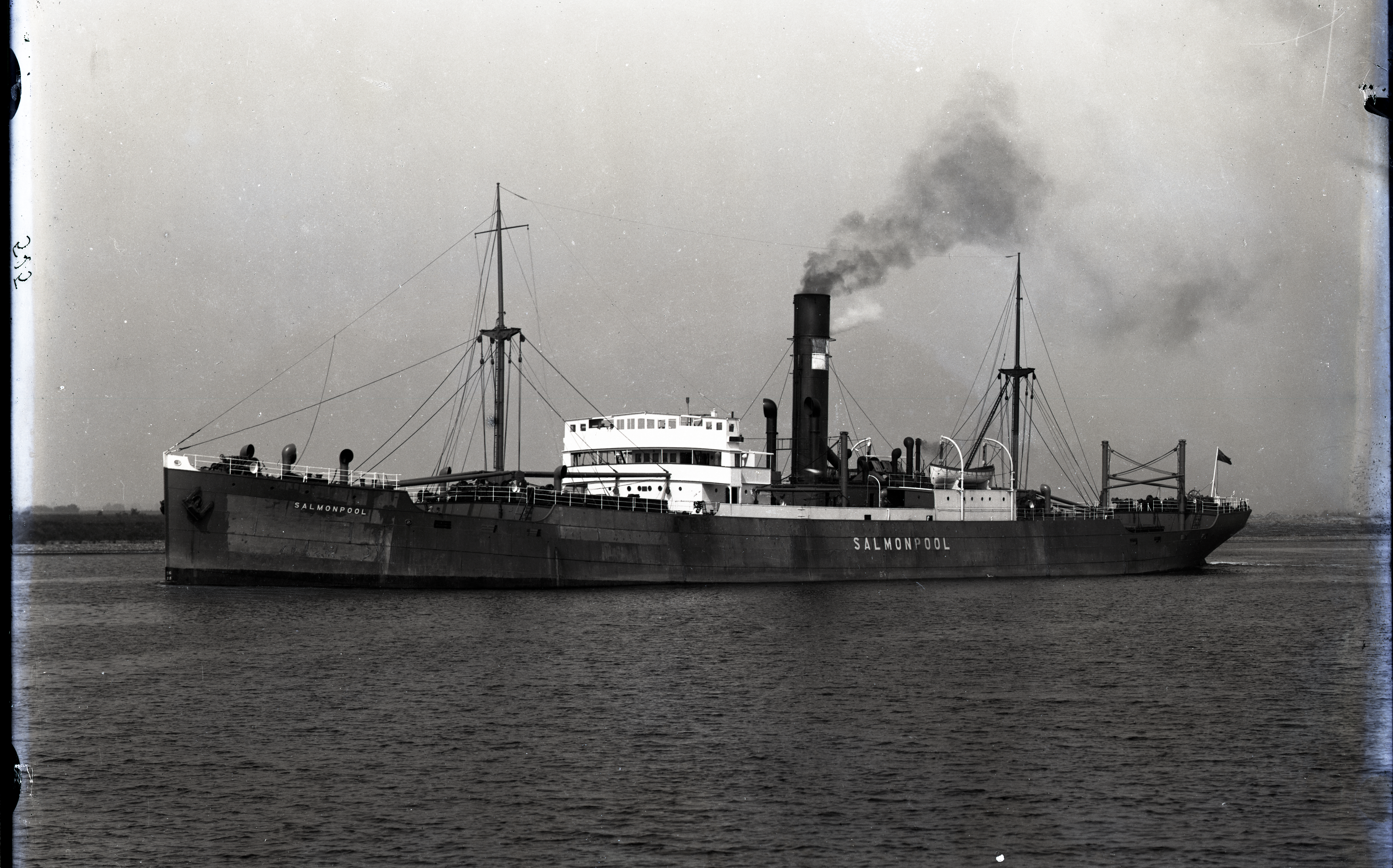
Salmonpool

Empire Salmonpool was a 4,928 GRT cargo ship which was built by Irvines Shipbuilding & Drydock Co Ltd, West Hartlepool. Completed in 1924 as Salmonpool for Sir R Ropner & Sons. On 15 April 1940, she was in Saudafjord but attempted to escape. Captured by the Kriegsmarine and escorted to Trondheim, Norway. Renamed Putzig, seized in May 1945 at Bremerhaven, to MoWT and renamed Empire Salmonpool. Sold in 1947 to Kyriakides Shipping Co. London and renamed Irene K. Renamed White Lodge in 1955 and sold later that year to Maritime Transport Overseas SA, Panama and renamed Puntarenas. Scrapped in 1958 in Avilés, Spain.

=== Empire Salvage ===
Empire Salvage was a 10,594 GRT tanker which was built by Rotterdam Droogdok Maatschappij, Rotterdam. Launched in 1940 as Papendrecht for Van Ommeren's Scheepsvaart Maatschappij, Rotterdam. Seized in May 1940 by German forces and renamed Lothringen. Converted to a replenishment ship, used to supply Bismarck and other raiders and submarines. Captured on 15 June 1941 north-west of the Cape Verde Islands (19°49′N 30°30′W) by Dunedin and escorted to Bermuda. Provided valuable intelligence on German methods of replenishment at sea, which were later adopted by the British with some modifications. To MoWT and renamed Empire Salvage. Used by the Royal Navy as a fleet oiler at Halifax, Nova Scotia and in the Far East. Returned to Van Ommeren's in 1946 and renamed Papendrecht. Scrapped in April 1964 at Onomichi, Japan.

=== Empire Sam ===
Empire Sam was a 275 GRT tug which was built by Cochrane & Sons Ltd, Selby. Launched on 1 June 1942 and completed in September 1942. Allocated in 1945 to the Hong Kong Government. Sold in 1965 to Yau Wing Co, Hong Kong and renamed Yau Wing No 23. Sold in 1966 to Cheung Chau Shipping & Trading Co and renamed Fedredge Sam. Operated under the management of Mollers Ltd, Hong Kong. Scrapped in September 1967 in Hong Kong.

=== Empire Sambar ===
Empire Sambar was a 6,038 GRT cargo ship which was built by the G. M. Standifer Construction Company, Vancouver, Washington. Completed in 1919 as Waban for United States Shipping Board (USSB). Sold in 1933 to Lykes Brothers-Ripley Steamship Co Inc. To MoWT in 1940 and renamed Empire Sambar. Boiler room explosion on 6 March 1941. Repaired and renamed Empire Beaver. To Norwegian Government in 1942 and renamed Norhauk. Struck a mine on 21 December 1943 and sank in the Thames Estuary (51°50′N 01°33′E).

=== Empire Samson ===
Empire Samson was a 261 GRT tug which was built by Goole Shipbuilding & Repairing Co Ltd, Goole. Launched on 8 April 1943 and completed in June 1943. On 26 July 1943 the Empire Brutus was bombed and severely damaged at (39°50′N 13°38′W), Empire Samson took her in tow, and taking five days to cover 230 nautical miles (430 km) safely arrived at Lisbon. Sold in 1948 to the Indian Government and renamed Sakti. Allocated to Madras Port Authority.

=== Empire Sandboy ===
Empire Sandboy was a 512 GRT bucket dredger which was built by William Simons & Co Ltd, Renfrew. Launched on 15 December 1944 and completed in February 1945. Sold in 1948 to the Argentinian Government and renamed M O P 28-C. Renamed Stella Maris, 28-C in 1949 and M O P 28-C, Stella Maris in 1958. Removed from shipping registers in 1985.

=== Empire Sandy ===
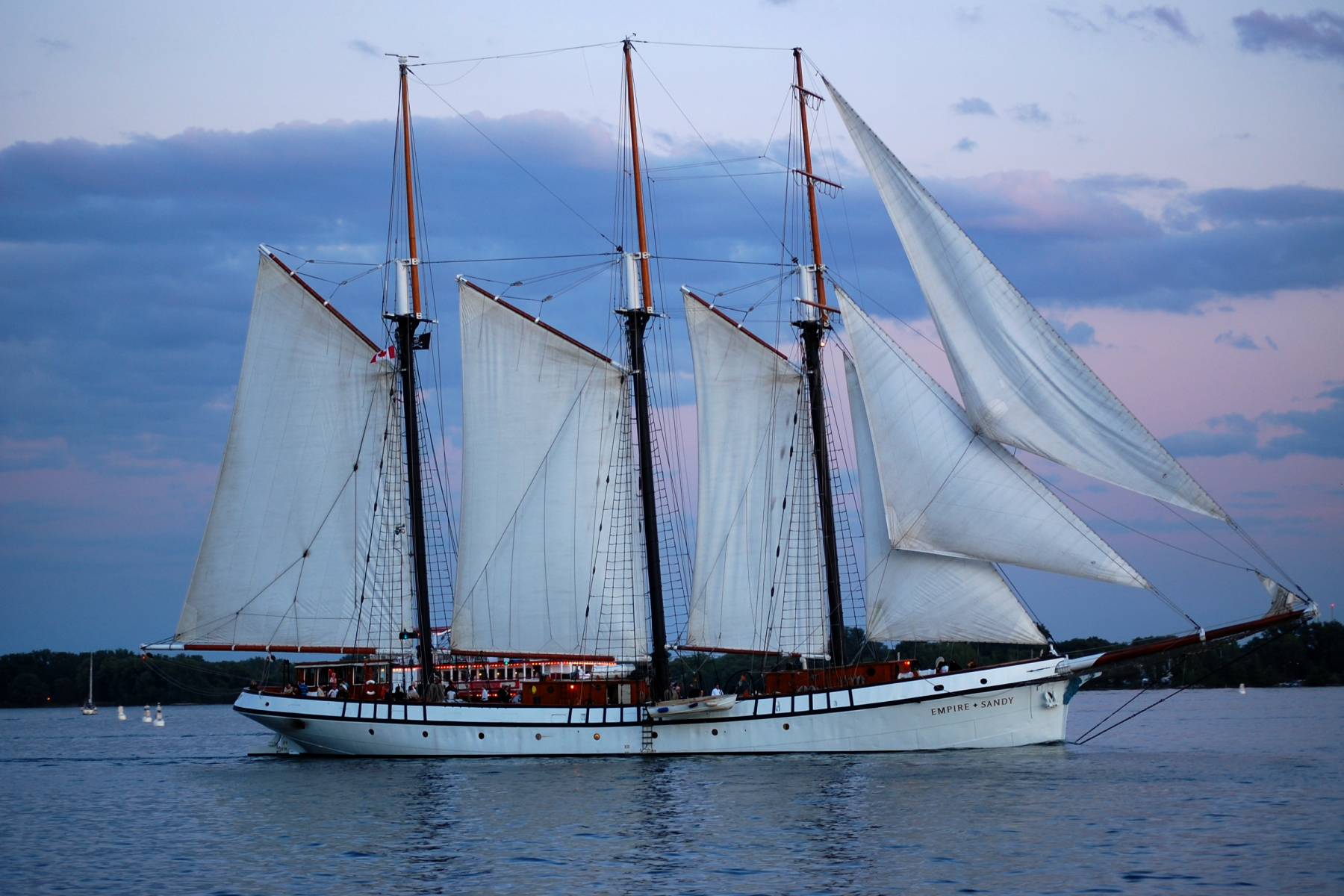
Empire Sandy

Empire Sandy is a schooner which was built as a 487 GRT tug by Clelands (Successors) Ltd, Wallsend. Launched on 22 December 1942 and completed in July 1943. Sold in 1948 to Risdon Beazley Ltd, Southampton and renamed Ashford. Sold in 1952 to Great Lakes Paper Co Ltd, Fort William, Ontario and renamed Chris M. Sold in 1979 to J E Rogers, Canada and renamed Empire Sandy. Sold in 1982 to Empire Sandy Inc, Canada and converted to a ferry. Converted in 1985 to a three-masted schooner.

=== Empire Sapphire ===
Empire Sapphire was an 8,031 GRT tanker which was built by Furness Shipbuilding Co Ltd, Haverton Hill-on-Tees. Launched on 27 May 1941 and completed in July 1941. Sold in 1946 to the Anglo-American Oil Co Ltd and renamed Esso Saranac. Arrived on 25 January 1959 at Antwerp for scrapping.

=== Empire Sara ===
Empire Sara was a 275 GRT tug which was built by Cochrane & Sons Ltd, Selby. Launched on 6 May 1943 and completed in August 1943. Sold in 1946 to Ellerman Wilson Line Ltd and renamed Presto. Sold in 1968 to United Towing Co Ltd. Resold later that year, arrived on 15 June 1968 at Blyth, Northumberland for scrapping.

=== Empire Sarawak ===
Empire Sarawak was a cargo ship which was built by John Readhead & Sons Ltd, South Shields. Launched on 24 August 1944. Taken over by the Admiralty and completed in 1945 as hull repair and maintenance ship Beauly Firth. Sold in 1948 to Stanhope Steamship Co Ltd and renamed Stanfirth (7,285 GRT). Operated under the management of J A Billmeier & Co Ltd. Sold in 1961 to Compagnia Navigazione y de Comercio Degedo Ltda, Costa Rica and renamed Akamas. Operated under the management of Aegis Shipping Co Ltd, Greece. Sold in 1966 to Akamas Shipping Co Ltd, Cyprus, remaining under Aegis's management. Renamed Skepsis in 1968, arrived on 23 August 1968 at Shanghai for scrapping.

=== Empire Saturn ===
Empire Saturn was an 8,224 GRT tanker which was built by Harland & Wolff Ltd, Belfast. Launched on 6 May 1944 and completed in September 1944. Sold in 1946 to Anglo-Saxon Petroleum Co Ltd and renamed Nayadis. Scrapped in October 1961 at Hirao, Japan.

=== Empire Saxon ===
Empire Saxon was a 8,129 tanker which was built by Swan, Hunter & Wigham Richardson Ltd., Wallsend. Launched on 29 March 1941 and completed in September 1941. To Norwegian Government in 1942 and renamed Norfjell. Sold to Skibsrederei A/S Ringfonn, Oslo in 1946 and renamed Nordfonn. New diesel engine in 1947. Sold to Mil Tankerei A/s in 1957 and renamed Norsk Jarl. Arrived at Bo'ness for breaking on 27 June 1960.

=== Empire Sceptre ===
Empire Sceptre was a 7,359 GRT cargo ship which was built by William Doxford & Sons Ltd Sunderland. Launched on 16 September 1943 and completed in January 1944. Allocated in 1945 to the French Government and renamed Jacques Bingen. Sold in 1954 to Rederi A/B Sigyn and renamed Sottern. Operated under the management of Lundren & Borjesson, Sweden. Sold in 1963 to Zirda Compagnia Navigazione SA and renamed Red Rose. Operated under the management of F Italo Groce, Italy. Arrived on 16 February 1970 at Spezia, Italy for scrapping.

=== Empire Scott ===
Empire Scott was a 6,150 GRT cargo ship which was built by John Readhead & Sons Ltd, South Shields. Launched on 10 July 1941 and completed in August 1941. Sold in 1946 to Chine Shipping Co Ltd and renamed Walter Scott. Operated under the management of Anglo-Danubian Transport Co Ltd, London. Sold in 1960 to Lanena Shipping Co Ltd, Hong Kong and renamed Zafiro. Operated under the management of T Engan, Manila. Sold in 1961 to Sigma Shipping Co Ltd and renamed Oriental. Operated under the management of Trinity Development Co Ltd, Hong Kong. Scrapped in 1963 in Hong Kong.

=== Empire Scout ===
Empire Scout was a 2,229 GRT cargo ship which was built by Lübecker Maschinenbau Gesellschaft, Lübeck. Completed in 1936 as Eilbek for Knohr & Burchard, Hamburg. Captured on 19 November 1939 south of Iceland by HMS Scotstoun while attempting to break the blockade disguised as a Swedish merchant ship. To MoWT and renamed Empire Scout. Sold in 1946 to Dillwyn Steamship Co and renamed Kellwyn. Sold in 1950 to J Blumenthal, Hamburg and renamed Claus Boge. Sold in 1960 to Compagnia Navigazione Viamar, Greece and renamed Antonakis. Scrapped in August 1968 at Split, Yugoslavia.

=== Empire Seabank ===
Empire Seabank was a 522 GRT coaster which was built by Goole Shipbuilding & Repairing Co Ltd, Goole. Launched on 23 November 1945 and completed in January 1946. Sold in 1946 to Middle East Coastal Services Ltd, Cyprus and renamed Halfaya. Sold in 1950 to Straits Steamship Co Ltd and renamed Semantan. Sold in 1967 to Sharikat Perk Sendirian, Malaysia. Sold in 1960 to Keenan Shipping (Private) Ltd, Singapore and renamed Tropic Seas. Renamed Moon River in 1973 and reflagged to Panama. Sold in 1977 to River Navigation Co, Panama and renamed Success Star. Ran aground in January 1977 off Tumpat, Malaya and abandoned. The wreck was offered for sale and scrap in December 1979.

=== Empire Seabeach ===
Empire Seabeach was a 522 GRT coaster which was built by Henry Scarr Ltd, Hessle. Launched in February 1945 and completed in April 1945. Sold in 1946 to Straits Steamship Co Ltd and renamed Sedenak. Sold in 1967 to Sharikat Perk Sendirian, Malaya. Sold in 1969 to Tan Yong Sing Shipping Co, Singapore and renamed Selamat. Ran aground on 17 July 1971 at Kalampunian Island, Borneo (07°03′N 116°44′E) and abandoned as a total loss.

=== Empire Seabird ===
Empire Seabird was a 522 GRT coaster which was built by Henry Scarr Ltd, Hessle. Launched on 26 June 1945 and completed in September 1945. Sold in 1947 to Straits Steamship Co Ltd and renamed Stia. Sold in 1960 to Teck Hwa Shipping Co Ltd, Singapore and renamed Anli. Sold in 1965 to Kie Hock Shipping Co Ltd (owner: Tay Hock Gwan), Singapore. Sold to new Singapore based owners in 1972 and renamed Global Trader. Sold in 1974 to Lam Kok Shipping Co Ltd, Singapore and renamed Ever Faithful. Sold in 1981 to Sunrise Asia Shipping Co, Panama and renamed Blue Eagle.

=== Empire Seablue ===
Empire Seablue was a 518 GRT coaster which was built by Clelands (Successors) Ltd, Wallsend. Launched on 28 July 1945 and completed in August 1945. Sold in 1950 to Instone Lines Ltd and renamed Seablue. On 13 February 1954, she struck the wreck of Empire Blessing off Knocke, Belgium and was holed. Attempt made to beach her, but she sank 5 nautical miles (9.3 km) west-south-west of Vlissingen, Netherlands.

=== Empire Seaboy ===
Empire Seaboy was a 522 GRT coaster which was built by Henry Scarr Ltd, Hessle. Launched in April 1945 and completed in June 1945. Sold in 1946 to Straits Steamship Co Ltd and renamed Sirusa. Sold in 1967 to Sharikat Perk Sendirian, Malaya. Sold in 1971 to Samudera P T Perusahan Pelayaran Nusantata, Indonesia and renamed Darpo Lima.

=== Empire Seabreeze ===
Empire Seabreeze was a 522 GRT coaster which was built by Henry Scarr Ltd, Hessle. Launched in April 1945 and completed in June 1945. Sold in 1947 to Straits Steamship Co Ltd and renamed Senai. Sold in 1962 to Tiong Lam Hang Shipping Co Ltd, Hong Kong and renamed Changi. Sold later that year to Cosmos Shipping Co SA, Panama and renamed Mene. Sold in 1983 to Naviera Voluntad Société de RL, Honduras and renamed Mercury. Foundered on 23 December 1984 off Tumpat, Malaya (5°50′N 102°36′E).

=== Empire Seabright ===
Empire Seabright was a 522 GRT coaster which was built by Goole Shipbuilding & Repairing Co Ltd, Goole. Launched on 8 October 1945 and completed in December 1945. Sold in 1949 to Overseas Fish Import Co Ltd and renamed Helen Seabright. Operated under the management of Great Yarmouth Shipping Co Ltd, Great Yarmouth. Sold in 1951 to General Steam Navigation Co Ltd and renamed Ortolan. Reflagged to Panama in 1958 and renamed Georgios K. Sold in 1962 to Cathay Shipping Corporation, Panama and renamed Laut Mas. Operated under the management of Guan Guan Shipping Co, Singapore. Sold in 1964 to Transportes Maritime de San Blas SA, Panama and renamed Pasteur. Sank on 14 January 1971 180 nautical miles (330 km) east of Singapore (00°56′N 107°53′E) on a voyage from Sibu, Sarawak to Singapore. She was well off the normal route at the time of her loss!

=== Empire Seabrook ===
Empire Seabrook was a 518 GRT coaster which was built by Shipbuilding Corporation, Newcastle upon Tyne. Launched on 28 March 1945 and completed in May 1945. Sold in 1947 to Coastal Carriers Ltd, Grimsby and renamed Legbourne. Operated under the management of Gillie & Blair Ltd. Sold in 1951 to Soon Bee Steamship Co and renamed Maston. Operated under the management of Heap Eng Moh Steamship Co, Singapore. Renamed Bee Tong later that year. Sold in 1959 to Guan Guan Ltd and renamed Singa Mas. Operated under the management of Chek Guan & Co, Singapore. Sold in 1964 to Transportes Maritime de San Blas SA, Panama and renamed Napoleon. Operated under the management of Guan Guan Shipping Co, Singapore. Sold c1973 to Thai owners and renamed Aquatic 2. Renamed Red Eagle in 1975. Sank on 17 March 1975 in Telok Ayer Basin. Singapore. Raised and sold for scrap, scrapped in March 1976 at Jurong, Singapore.

=== Empire Seacoast ===
Empire Seacoast was a 522 GRT coaster which was built by Henry Scarr Ltd, Hessle. Launched in June 1945 and completed in October 1945. Sold in 1946 to Middle East Coastal Services Ltd, Cyprus and renamed Birhakim. Sold in 1949 to Indian General Navigation and Railway Co, Calcutta and renamed Tanda. Sold in 1961 to Pakistan River Steamers Ltd, Pakistan. Sold in 1975 to Bangladesh Inland Water Corporation, Bangladesh and renamed C5-212.

=== Empire Seafarer ===
Empire Seafarer was a 522 GRT coaster which was built by Goole Shipbuilding & Repairing Co Ltd, Goole. Launched on 11 June 1945 and completed in July 1945. Sold in 1946 to Straits Steamship Co Ltd and renamed Sumpitan. Scrapped in June 1965 in Singapore.

=== Empire Seaflower ===
Empire Seaflower was a 522 GRT coaster which was built by Goole Shipbuilding & Repairing Co Ltd, Goole. Launched on 21 September 1945 and completed in November 1945. Sold in 1946 to Middle East Coastal Services Ltd, Cyprus and renamed Mersamatruh. Sold in 1950 to the Middle East & Caribbean Shipping Co, Bahamas and renamed Isle of Mahe. Renamed Mersa Matruh in 1953. Sold in 1956 to Savon & Ries (Aden Shipping) Ltd, Aden and renamed Shibam. Sold in 1966 to Shipping Travel & Lighterage Co of Aden Ltd. Driven aground on 10 November 1966 in a tropical cyclone at Salalah, Oman. Cargo jettisoned and the ship abandoned. Refloated on 24 November 1966 and towed to Aden where she was repaired. Sold in 1967 to Mohsin E Aldarazy & Brothers, Bahrain and renamed Al Fatch.

=== Empire Seafoam ===
Empire Seafoam was a 522 GRT coaster which was built by Goole Shipbuilding and Repairing Co Ltd, Goole. Launched on 4 February 1946 and completed in July 1946. Sold in 1946 to Middle East Coastal Services Ltd, Cyprus and renamed Mareth. Sold in 1949 to British India Steam Navigation Co Ltd and renamed Teesta. Sold in 1950 to Rivers Steam Navigation Co, London. Sold in 1961 to Pakistan River Steamers Ltd. Sold in 1975 to Bangladesh Inland Water Transport Corp and renamed C5-213.

=== Empire Seaforth ===
Empire Seaforth was a 518 GRT coaster which was built by Shipbuilding Corporation, Newcastle upon Tyne. Launched in February 1945 and completed in March 1945. Sold in 1947 to Seaway Coasters Ltd and renamed Seaforth. Operated under the management of C Howard & Sons, London. Renamed Halfaya in 1951 and management passed to J Fisher & Sons, Barrow in Furness. Sold in 1955 to A R Mohamed Saleh Al Haddad, Dubai and renamed Beihan.

=== Empire Seafront ===
Empire Seafront was a 522 GRT coaster which was built by Henry Scarr Ltd, Hessle. Launched in March 1945 and completed in May 1945. Sold in 1946 to Straits Steamship Co Ltd and renamed Seramban. Scrapped in December 1965 in Singapore.

=== Empire Seagrass ===
Empire Seagrass was a 522 GRT coaster which was built by Goole Shipbuilding & Repairing Co Ltd, Goole. Launched and completed in September 1945. Sold in 1946 to Straits Steamship Co Ltd and renamed Salong. Sold in 1962 to Kee Lee Shipping Co Ltd, Singapore and renamed Pulau Tekong. Sold in 1965 to Madam Dolly Seah, Singapore. Sold in 1968 to Ting Chu Ling, Sarawak.

=== Empire Seagreen ===
Empire Seagreen was a 518 GRT coaster which was built by Clelands (Successors) Ltd, Wallsend. Launched on 6 September 1945 and completed in October 1945. Sold in 1950 to Instone Lines Ltd and renamed Seagreen. Sold in 1959 to H Harvey, Quebec, 'tween deck removed and renamed St Pierre, now 386 GRT. To Transport Maritime Harvey Ltee, Quebec in 1962. Replacement 1951-built diesel engine fitted in 1969. Sank on 9 May 1974 in the Lachine Canal, Montreal. Raised, scrapped in situ in June 1974.

=== Empire Seagull ===
Empire Seagull was a 522 GRT coaster which was built by Henry Scarr Ltd, Hessle. Launched in May 1945 and completed in July 1945. Sold in 1947 to Straits Steamship Co Ltd and renamed Serampang. Sold in 1967 to Sharikat Perk. Sendirian, Malaya. Sold in 1970 to Samudera P T Perusahan Pelayaran Nusantara, Indonesia and renamed Darpo Empat.

=== Empire Seahawk ===
Empire Seahawk was a 522 GRT coaster which was built by Henry Scarr Ltd, Hessle. Launched in March 1945 and completed in May 1945. Sold in 1946 to Straits Steamship Co Ltd and renamed Seramban. Scrapped in December 1965 in Singapore.

=== Empire Seal ===
Empire Seal was a 7,965 GRT, twin screw motor ship built for American-Hawaiian Steamship Co by the Merchant Shipbuilding Corporation, Chester, Pennsylvania launched 14 November 1921 as Californian with engines built and separately installed after launch by William Cramp & Sons Ship and Engine Building Company, Philadelphia. Engine trials were run 1—2 May 1922 off the Delaware Breakwater with a speed, adjusted for tide, of 12.57 knots and over 13 knots in open sea before departing 6 May for New York for hull cleaning and painting in drydock. To MoWT in 1940 and renamed Empire Kite then Empire Seal later that year. Torpedoed on 19 February 1942 and sunk by U-96 at 43°14′N 64°45′W.

=== Empire Sealion ===
Empire Sealion was a 522 GRT coaster which was built by Henry Scarr Ltd, Hessle. Launched in July 1945 and completed in September 1945. Sold in 1947 to Straits Steamship Co Ltd and renamed Serudom. Sold in 1962 to Tiong Lam Hang Shipping SA, Panama and renamed Jurong. Sold in 1967 to Cosmos Shipping Co Sa, Panama and renamed Soon Hong. Renamed Soon Lee in c1975, scrapped in March 1976 in Singapore.

=== Empire Seaman (I) ===
Empire Seaman was a 1,927 GRT cargo ship which was built by Schiffs- und Dockbau, Lübeck. Completed in 1922 as Morea for Deutsche Levant Line, Hamburg. When war broke out, she took refuge at Vigo, Spain. Sailed on 10 February 1940 and sighted on 12 February 500 nautical miles (930 km) off the coast of Portugal by Hasty disguised as a Danish merchant ship. Attempts to scuttle her were foiled and she was captured and escorted to Falmouth. To MoWT and renamed Empire Seaman. Scuttled on 4 December 1940 as a blockship in a Channel port.

=== Empire Seaman (II) ===
Empire Seaman was a 2,905 GRT cargo ship which was built by William Gray & Co Ltd, West Hartlepool. Launched on 17 July 1943 and completed in October 1943. Sold in 1946 to Burnett Steamship Co Ltd, Newcastle upon Tyne and renamed Burnhope. Sold in 1961 to N Michalos & Sons Maritime Co Ltd, Greece and renamed Antonios Michalos. Struck a submerged object on 6 March 1968 at Brăila, Romania and ran aground. Refloated but with extensive damage to her stern. Arrived under tow on 17 April 1968 at Monfalcone, Italy where her cargo was discharged and she was declared a constructive total loss. Arrived under tow on 27 April 1968 at Trieste, Italy. Scrapped in May 1969 at Trieste.

=== Empire Seaport ===
Empire Seaport was a 522 GRT coaster which was built by Henry Scarr Ltd, Hessle. Launched in August 1945 and completed in November 1945. Sold in 1946 to Middle East Coastal Services Ltd, Cyprus and renamed Eladem. Sold in 1949 to Pakistan River Steamers Ltd and renamed Torilla. Sold the next year to Rivers Steam Navigation Co Ltd, London. Sold in 1975 to Bangladesh Inland Water Transport Corp, Bangladesh and renamed C5-216.

=== Empire Seascape ===
Empire Seascape was a 522 GRT coaster which was built by Goole Shipbuilding & Repairing Co Ltd, Goole. Launched on 27 February 1945 and completed in April 1945. Sold in 1946 to Straits Steamship Co Ltd and renamed Serdang. Sold in 1947 to Sharikat Perk. Sendirian, Malaya. Scrapped in March 1972 in Singapore.

=== Empire Seasheltie ===
Empire Seasheltie was a 522 GRT coaster which was built by Henry Scarr Ltd, Hessle. Launched in February 1945 and completed in March 1945. Sold in 1947 to Straits Steamship Co Ltd and renamed Selangor. Sold in 1967 to Sharikat Perk. Sendirian, Malaya. Scrapped in December 1967 in Singapore.

=== Empire Seashore ===
Empire Seashore was a 522 GRT coaster which was built by Goole Shipbuilding & Repairing Co Ltd. Launched on 17 March 1945 and completed in May 1945. Sold in 1945 to Straits Steamship Co Ltd and renamed Scudai. Sold in 1967 to Sharikat Perk. Sendirian, Malaya. Sold in 1974 to Borneo Maritime Transport Corporation (Private) Ltd, Singapore and renamed Tropic Trader. To Borneo Maritime Transport (Sabah) Sendirian, Labuan in 1978 and renamed Scudai. Scrapped in 1968 in Singapore.

=== Empire Seasilver ===
Empire Seasilver was a 518 GRT coaster which was built by Shipbuilding Corporation, Newcastle upon Tyne. Launched on 7 June 1945 and completed in August 1945. Sold in 1947 to Seaway Coasters Ltd and renamed Seasilver. Operated under the management of C Howard & Sons, London. Renamed Sidi Barrani in 1951 and management transferred to J Fisher & Sons, Barrow. Sold in 1955 to Savon & Ries (Ethiopian Shipping) Co, Massawa, Ethiopia and renamed Seiyun.

=== Empire Seaspray ===
Empire Seaspray was to have been a 522 GRT coaster built by Goole Shipbuilding and Repairing Co Ltd but her construction was cancelled by the MoWT due to the cessation of hostilities.

=== Empire Seaview ===
Empire Seaview was a 522 GRT coaster which was built by Henry Scarr Ltd, Hessle. Launched in August 1945 and completed in October 1945. Sold in 1947 to Straits Steamship Co Ltd and renamed Segamat. Scrapped in December 1966 in Singapore.

=== Empire Seaward ===
Empire Seaward was a 522 GRT coaster which was built by Goole Shipbuilding and Repairing Co Ltd, Goole. Launched on 12 April 1945 and completed in June 1945. Sold in 1946 to Straits Steamship Co Ltd and renamed Senggarang. Sold in 1960 to Teck Hwa Shipping Co Ltd, Singapore and renamed Anho. Sold in 1965 to Kie Hock Shipping Co Ltd, Singapore. Sold in 1977 to Borneo Maritime Transport (Sabah) Sendirian, Lebuan and renamed Sabah.

=== Empire Seaway ===
Empire Seaway was a 522 GRT coaster which was built by Goole Shipbuilding and Repairing Co Ltd, Goole. Launched in April 1945 and completed in July 1945. Sold in 1946 to Straits Steamship Co Ltd and renamed Sedili. Scrapped in September 1966 in Singapore.

=== Empire Seaworthy ===
Empire Seaworthy was a 522 GRT coaster which was built by Goole Shipbuilding and Repairing Co Ltd, Goole. Launched on 27 August 1945 and completed in October 1945. Sold in 1946 to Middle East Coastal Services Ltd, Cyprus and renamed Sidibarrani. Sold in 1951 to Straits Steamship Co Ltd and renamed Semenyih. Sold in 1967 to Sharikat Perk. Sendirian, Malaya. Scrapped in December 1971 in Singapore.

=== Empire Sedge ===
Empire Sedge was a 2,852 GRT Collier which was built by William Gray & Co Ltd, West Hartlepool. Launched on 11 June 1941 and completed in July 1941. Sold in 1945 to Burnett Steamship Co Ltd, Newcastle upon Tyne and renamed Holmside. Sold in 1956 to Shamrock Shipping Co, Northern Ireland and renamed Gransha. Sold in 1960 to Paolo Tomei, Italy and renamed Daniela T. Sold in 1962 to Capo Mannu Società di Navigazione, operated under the management of Paolo Tomei. Sold in 1972 to Mediterranea Marittima Sarda SpA, Sardinia and renamed Vulca. Scrapped in June 1974 at Spezia, Italy.

=== Empire Sedley ===
Empire Sedley was a 2,905 GRT cargo ship which was built by William Gray & Co Ltd, West Hartlepool. Launched on 11 December 1943 and completed in February 1944. Sold in 1945 to the French Government and renamed Intendant J Patrizi. Sold in 1949 to Les Cargoes Algeriennes SA, Algeria and renamed Menhir Braz. Sold in 1957 to Pamel Shipping Co and renamed Athina. Operated under the management of Michaelides et Compagnie SARL, Marseille. Caught fire on 14 March 1962 at Port-Saint-Louis-du-Rhône. Fire extinguished on 16 March but ship a constructive total loss. Scrapped in August 1962 at La Seyne-sur-Mer, France.

=== Empire Selwyn ===
Empire Selwyn was a 7,167 GRT cargo ship which was built by William Doxford & Sons Ltd, Sunderland. Launched on 27 August 1941 and completed in October 1941. Allocated in 1942 to the Belgian Government and renamed Belgian Soldier. Torpedoed on 7 August 1942 and sunk by U-553 south-east of Newfoundland (45°52′N 47°13′W) while a member of Convoy ON 115.

=== Empire Senlac ===
Empire Senlac was a 3,750 GRT tanker which was built by J L Thompson & Sons Ltd, Sunderland. Launched on 27 June 1945 and completed in October 1945. Sold in 1946 to Anglo-Saxon Petroleum Co Ltd and renamed Bullina. Sold in 1955 to Bulmar SpA Siciliana di Armamento, Italy and renamed Bulmar. Sold in 1967 to Compagnia Armamento Sicula Adriatica SpA, Italy and renamed Volina. Sold in 1969 to Maritime Aragua SA, Venezuela. Scrapped in March 1977 at Cartagena, Spain.

=== Empire Sentinel ===
Empire Sentinel was a 683 GRT coaster which was built by G Seebeck AG, Bremerhaven. Completed in 1898 as Phaedra for Neptun Line, Bremen. On 14 January 1940 she was captured by the Royal Navy in the North Sea. To MoWT and renamed Empire Sentinel. Requisitioned in 1943 by the Admiralty, to Royal Navy and renamed HMS Rampant, a wreck dispersal ship. To MoWT in December 1946, sold in 1947 to Wizard Shipping Co, London and renamed Yiaghos. Arrested in 1948 due to unpaid debts, renamed Empire Sentinel. Sold to De Malglave Shipping Co and renamed Raymond Olivier. Sold in 1951 to Costa Rican Navigation Co, Honduras. Operated under the management of Italiana Commerciale Maritime, Italy. Renamed Mariapaolina in 1955, management passing to Framar SpA, Italy. Scrapped in January 1960 at Vado, Italy.

=== Empire Seraph ===
Empire Seraph was a 129 GRT tug which was built by Cochrane & Sons Ltd, Selby. Launched on 25 October 1942 and completed in December 1942. Sold in 1947 to the Polish Government and renamed Bizon. Classed as non-seagoing in 1961 and name deleted from shipping registers.

=== Empire Service ===
Empire Service was a 7,067 GRT cargo ship which was built by Lithgows Ltd, Port Glasgow. Launched on 20 May 1943 and completed in July 1943. Sold in 1945 to T & J Harrison and renamed Selector. Sold in 1960 to Compagnia Navigazione Margalante, Panama and renamed Margalante II. Arrived on 9 May 1961 at Hirao, Japan for scrapping.

=== Empire Settler ===
Empire Settler was a 797 GRT coastal tanker built by Grangemouth Dockyard Co Ltd, Grangemouth. Launched on 11 October 1943 and completed in November 1943. Sold in 1947 to British Tanker Co Ltd and renamed Iran. Sold in 1958 to BP Tanker Co Ltd and renamed Widad. Sold in 1962 to N E Vernicos Shipping Co Ltd, Greece and renamed Motol VII. Scrapped in April 1968 at Piraeus, Greece.

=== Empire Severn ===
Empire Severn was a 6,681 GRT cargo ship which was built by Harland & Wolff Ltd, Glasgow. Completed in 1914 as Egba for Elder, Dempster & Co. In 1943, her owners wished to scrap her due to mechanical problems but she was purchased by the MoWT and renamed Empire Severn. On 10 February 1946 she dragged her anchors and collided with SS Leighton in Holy Loch and was damaged. On 19 February she again broke free from her moorings and collided with Leighton. On 12 October 1946 she was scuttled northwest of the Hebrides with a cargo of obsolete chemical ammunition (58°18′N 09°37′E).

=== Empire Shackleton ===
Empire Shackleton was a 7,068 GRT CAM ship which was built by Lithgows Ltd, Port Glasgow. Launched on 23 July 1941 and completed in October 1941. Torpedoed on 28 December 1942 and sunk by U-225 at 43°23′N 27°14′W.

=== Empire Shearwater (I) ===
Empire Shearwater was a 4,790 GRT cargo ship which was built by American International Shipbuilding, Hog Island, Pennsylvania. Completed in 1919 as Clearwater for the USSB. To Mississippi Shipping Co Inc in 1929. To MoWT in 1940 and renamed Empire Shearwater. Sold in 1946 to Quentin Shipping Co Ltd and renamed St Jessica. Operated under the management of South American Saint Line Ltd. Sold in 1950 to Meserreticoglu, Turkey and renamed Karsiyaka. Arrived on 1 February 1958 at Istanbul with engine trouble and damaged driveshaft. Scrapped in December 1958 at Istanbul.

=== Empire Shearwater (II) ===
Empire Shearwater was a 4,800 GRT LST (3) which was built by William Pickersgill & Sons Ltd. Completed in 1945 as LST 3033. To MoWT in 1956 and renamed Empire Shearwater. To European Ferries Ltd in 1958. Operated under the management of Townsend Brothers Ferries Ltd. Arrived on 28 November 1962 at Ghent, Belgium for scrapping.

=== Empire Sheba ===
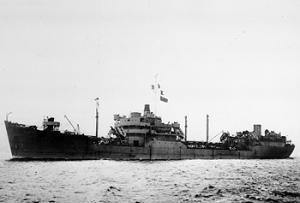
RFA Wave King

Empire Sheba was to have been an 8,189 GRT tanker which was built by Harland & Wolff, Govan. Laid down as Empire Sheba but taken over by the Admiralty on 28 January 1944 and name cancelled. Launched on 6 June 1944 and completed in July 1944 as RFA Wave King. On 9 August 1956 she struck a rock north of São Luís de Maranhão, Brazil (01°04′S 44°32′W). Refloated but badly damaged, returned to the UK. Sold in March 1960 to H G Pounds, Portsmouth for scrapping. Resold and arrived on 16 April 1960 under tow of ST Merchantman at Barrow in Furness for scrapping.

=== Empire Sheila ===
Empire Sheila was a 292 GRT tug which was built by Cochrane & Sons Ltd, Selby. Launched on 30 March 1945 and completed in September 1945. Sold in 1949 to Overseas Towage and Salvage Ltd and renamed Sheila. Sold in 1950 to Société Cher de Remorquage d'Assistance, Casablanca and renamed Sidi Belyout. A new diesel engine was fitted in 1956. Sold in 1960 to Rimini Sardi, Italy and renamed Tirso. New diesel engine fitted in 1978.

=== Empire Shelter ===
Empire Shelter was a 1,333 GRT convoy rescue ship which was built by G Brown & Co (Marine) Ltd, Greenock. Launched on 5 October 1944 as HMS Barnard Castle and completed in March 1945 as Empire Shelter. Laid up c1954 at Falmouth, Cornwall. Arrived on 22 July 1955 in tow of ST Marinia for scrapping. Scrapped in September 1955 at Burght, Belgium.

=== Empire Shepherd ===
Empire Shepherd was a 2,066 GRT collier which was built by Grangemouth Dockyard Co, Grangemouth. Launched on 10 July 1944 and completed in October 1944. Sold in 1948 to Sheaf Steamship Co Ltd and renamed Sheaf Arrow. Operated under the management of W A Souter & Co Ltd, Newcastle upon Tyne. Sold in 1956 to A Kjerland & Co A/S, Norway and renamed Eva. Sold in 1969 to Poul Christensen, Denmark. Scrapped in December 1969 at Antwerp, Belgium.

=== Empire Shetland ===
Empire Shetland was an 813 GRT coaster which was built by A & J Inglis Ltd, Glasgow. Launched on 19 January 1945 and completed in April 1945. Sold in 1948 to Kuwait Oil Co Ltd and renamed Adib. Operated under the management of Anglo-Iranian Oil Co Ltd. Sold in 1952 to Shell Mex & BP Ltd and renamed BP Transporter. Scrapped in June 1965 in Antwerp, Belgium.

=== Empire Shirley ===
Empire Shirley was a 235 GRT tug which was built by A Hall & Co Ltd, Aberdeen. Launched on 27 June 1945 and completed in August 1945. Sold in 1947 to Union Steamship Company of New Zealand and renamed Taphui. Sold to Fijian owners in 1973 and renamed Tui Tawate. Sold in 1974 to R Discomb, Fiji and renamed Tui Tuate. Sold in 1986 to C Griffiths, Wellington, New Zealand. At this time, she was laid up at Port Vila, Vanuatu. Intended to be converted to a floating restaurant but was in too poor a condition to be towed.

=== Empire Shoal ===
Empire Shoal was an 878 GRT coaster which was built by Harland & Wolff Ltd, Govan. Launched on 13 February 1941 and completed in June 1941. Sold in 1946 to F T Everard & Sons Ltd and renamed Angularity. Sold in 1967 to G Tzortzis & others, Greece and renamed Elpis. Sprang a leak on 22 January 1968 and sank between Ameland and Schiermonnikoog, Netherlands (53°35′N 05°51′E).

== See also ==
The above entries give a precis of each ship's history. For a fuller account see the linked articles.

== Bibliography ==
- Mitchell, WH; Sawyer, LA (1990). The Empire Ships (2nd ed.). London, New York, Hamburg, Hong Kong: Lloyd's of London Press Ltd. ISBN 1-85044-275-4.
