= Empire Service (disambiguation) =

Empire Service may refer to:

- Empire Service, a train service in New York State
- Empire Service (1943–1961), one of the Empire ships in service of the British government
- BBC Empire Service, forerunner to the BBC World Service
