= SS Empire Comfort =

World War II merchant ship of the United Kingdom

History
- Name: HMS York Castle (1944); SS Empire Comfort (1944-55)
- Namesake: York Castle
- Owner: Admiralty (1944); Ministry of War Transport (1944-45); Ministry of Transport (1945-55)
- Port of registry: United Kingdom
- Builder: Ferguson Brothers (Port Glasgow) Ltd.
- Yard number: 372
- Launched: 29 September 1944
- Completed: December 1944
- Commissioned: Never commissioned
- Out of service: 1954-55
- Identification: Pennant number K537 (York Castle)
- Fate: Scrapped 1955

General characteristics
- Tonnage: 1,333 GRT
- Displacement: 1,060 long tons (1,080 t)
- Length: 252 ft (76.81 m)
- Beam: 36 ft (10.97 m)
- Draught: 13 ft 6 in (4.11 m)
- Installed power: Quadruple expansion steam engine
- Propulsion: Screw propeller
- Speed: 16.5 knots (30.6 km/h)

SS Empire Comfort was a 1,333 GRT convoy rescue ship which was launched in 1944 as HMS York Castle a Castle-class corvette, but was renamed Empire Castle and converted for merchant service before completion by Ferguson Brothers (Port Glasgow) Ltd., Port Glasgow as yard number 372. She was launched on 20 September 1944. The ship was 252 feet (76.81 m) long, with a beam of 36 feet (10.97 m) and a draught of 13 feet 6 inches (4.11 m).

== History ==
The ship was completed in December 1944 as Empire Comet for the Ministry of War Transport (MoWT). She was placed under the management of Ellerman City Line. Empire Comfort was a member of a number of convoys during the Second World War.

OS 113

Convoy OS 113 departed the Clyde and The Downs on 25 February 1945. It dispersed at sea on 1 March 1945. Empire Comfort made her first voyage as a convoy rescue ship as a member of this convoy.

MKS 85G

Convoy MKS 85G departed Gibraltar on 24 February 1945 bound for the United Kingdom. Empire Comfort was employed as a convoy rescue ship for this convoy.

OS 116

Convoy OS 116 departed from the Clyde and The Downs on 12 March 1945. It dispersed at 42°57′N 11°45′W on 17 March. Empire Comfort was a member of this convoy.

MKS 88G

Convoy MKS 88G departed from Casablanca, Morocco on 11 March 1945 bound for the United Kingdom. Empire Comfort was employed as a convoy rescue ship for this convoy.

OS 121

Convoy OS 121 departed from the Clyde on 7 April 1945 and dispersed at sea on 14 April. Empire Comfort was employed as a convoy rescue ship for this convoy.

MKS 93G

Convoy MKS 93G departed from Gibraltar on 5 April 1945 bound for the United Kingdom. Empire Comfort was employed as a convoy rescue ship for this convoy.

In 1948, Empire Comfort was in the Mediterranean where she was working under the control of the Middle East Command. Empire Comfort was used as a troopship between Port Said, Egypt and Famagusta, Cyprus and also between Port Said and Tobruk, Libya. She was used in this role from July 1948 to at least February 1949. In 1954, Empire Comfort was laid up at Falmouth, Cornwall. In June 1955, Empire Comfort, along with Empire Lifeguard and Empire Peacemaker were offered for sale "as lying at Falmouth". In July 1955, she was sold to Belgian buyers and towed to Antwerp. It was intended that she would be converted for service in the Belgian Congo, but she was scrapped in December 1955 at Ghent.
