= Lothringen (disambiguation) =

Lothringen, or Lorraine, is a region of northeastern France.

Lothringen may also refer to:

- Battery Lothringen, a World War II coastal artillery battery in Jersey
- Bezirk Lothringen, a German Department from 1871 to 1918
- CdZ-Gebiet Lothringen, an administrative division under German occupation 1940-1945
- SMS Lothringen, a pre-dreadnought battleship of the Imperial German Navy
- Lothringen (oil tanker), a tanker that supplied oil to the German battleship Bismarck, amongst others

== See also ==
- House of Habsburg-Lothringen
