= MV Seramban =

MV Seramban is the name of a number of ships:-

- MV Seramban, launched in 1945 as Empire Seafront.
- MV Seramban, launched in 1945 as Empire Seagull.
