= MV Halfaya =

MV Halfaya has been the name of a number of ships.

- MV Halfaya, launched in 1945 as Empire Seabank.
- MV Halfaya, launched in 1945 as Empire Seaforth.
