= Rayleigh Castle =

Norman earthworks in Rayleigh, Essex, England

Coordinates: 51.588°N 0.6045°E

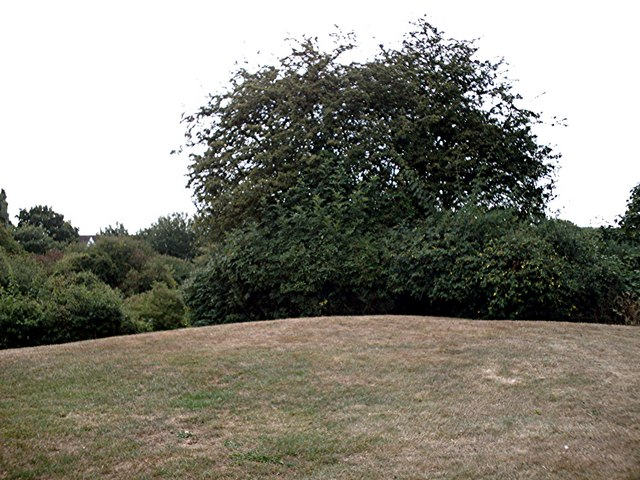
The summit of Rayleigh Castle

Rayleigh Castle (also known as Rayleigh Mount) was a masonry and timber castle built in the town of Rayleigh in Essex, England in the 11th century shortly after the Norman Conquest of 1066. All that exists today are the earthwork remains of its large motte-and-bailey.

== History ==
Rayleigh is one of 48 castles mentioned in the Domesday Book of 1086, and the only one in the county of Essex. The Survey records that Swein (other spellings are Sweyn, Sweyne, and Suen) built the castle in his manor. He was the son of Robert FitzWimarc, a Norman lord and favourite of Edward the Confessor (r. 1042–1066). Swein was one of the wealthiest landowners in post-Conquest Essex, and the Survey records that in 1086 his lands were worth £255. As Swein was the son of a favourite of Edward, it is likely that he did not arrive with William the Conqueror in 1066, but was instead born in England. Most land owners with significant holdings at the time of the Domesday Survey had disjointed, scattered properties; however, Swein was one of the exceptions and most of his land was within the hundreds of Rochford and Barstable, with Rayleigh Castle as the administrative centre.

Adrian Pettifer notes that Rayleigh's plan is similar to that of two other motte-and-bailey castles in Essex: Pleshey and Ongar.

On Swein's death the castle passed to his son Robert of Essex (c. 1085 - died before 1159) and thence to his grandson Henry of Essex. Around 1140 the motte was covered in stone rubble.

Henry was accused of cowardice in battle in 1163 and subject to a trial by combat, which he lost. The castle and its estates were confiscated to become the property of the king, Henry II. Extensive alterations were made to it in 1172 and in 1183-4. The property was given by King John to Hubert de Burgh in around 1200, who probably used it as a source of building materials for the new castle which he started building in 1230 about 5 kilometres (3.1 mi) away, namely Hadleigh Castle overlooking the Thames Estuary.

On the death of Hubert's son in the latter half of the 13th century, ownership of Rayleigh Castle reverted to the Crown. Documents dating between 1279 and 1303 refer to the motte being used for pasture, which probably means that the castle was no longer used as a fortification. In 1394 Richard II gave permission for the townspeople of Rayleigh to use the foundations of the castle as a source of stone. Since the foundations are explicitly mentioned in the document giving permission, it is unlikely that any other masonry structures remained standing by then.

== 21st century ==
The site of the castle was used for grazing sheep after it fell into disuse. Photos taken in the 1920s show the mount free from any large trees or shrubs as the grazing prevented their growth; however since the grazing stopped, large trees have grown on the site. The National Trust who manage the site have no plans to remove the trees for fear of disturbing any potential archaeology below.

The Second World War Convoy rescue ship Empire Rest was originally laid down as a Castle-class corvette to have been named HMS Rayleigh Castle after the ruins.

== See also ==
- Castles in Great Britain and Ireland
- List of castles in England
