= SS Empire Peacemaker =

World War II merchant ship of the United Kingdom

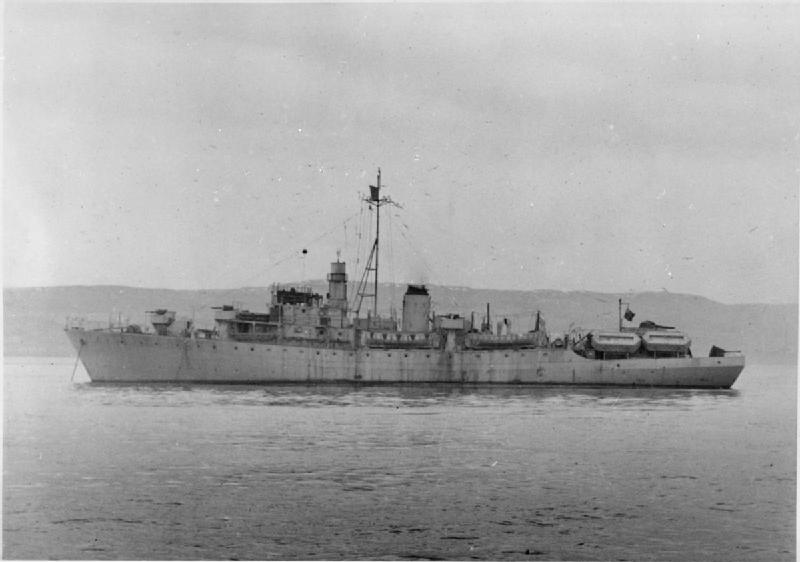

History

United Kingdom
- Name: SS Empire Peacemaker
- Owner: Ministry of War Transport (1945); Royal Army Service Corps (1945-1954)
- Ordered: 23 January 1943
- Builder: Fleming & Ferguson, Paisley
- Yard number: 665
- Launched: 8 September 1944, as Scarborough Castle
- Completed: January 1945, as Empire Peacemaker
- In service: February 1945
- Out of service: 1954
- Identification: Official number: 169428; Call sign: GJBT
- Fate: Sold for scrapping, July 1955

General characteristics
- Class & type: Castle-class corvette, converted to convoy rescue ship
- Tonnage: 1,333 GRT
- Length: 252 ft (77 m)
- Beam: 36 ft (11 m)
- Draught: 13 ft 6 in (4.11 m)
- Propulsion: 2,889 ihp (2,154 kW) triple expansion steam engine, 2 shafts
- Speed: 16.5 knots (30.6 km/h; 19.0 mph)

SS Empire Peacemaker was a British convoy rescue ship that served at the end of World War II, originally laid down as the corvette HMS Scarborough Castle. Post-war she served as an Army transport ship before being scrapped in 1955.

== Ship history ==
The ship was ordered from Fleming & Ferguson Ltd. of Paisley on 23 January 1943 as a Castle-class corvette. She was launched on 8 September 1944 as Scarborough Castle (K536), but further work was then cancelled, and she was eventually completed as a convoy rescue ship in January 1945. Under the ownership of the Ministry of War Transport, and managed by the Ellerman City Line, she sailed on eight convoys between early February and the end of the war in Europe in May 1945. During that time she rescued three survivors from an aircraft which had overrun the flight deck of the MAC ship MV Empire MacAlpine.

Post-war she was transferred to the Transport Branch of the Royal Army Service Corps for service as a troop transport. In October 1945 she sailed from the Clyde to Arkhangelsk to repatriate a Royal Navy Shore Party. In January 1946 she made three voyages between Southampton and St. Helier, Jersey, carrying returning service personnel.

In 1952 Empire Peacemaker, Empire Shelter and Empire Lifeguard provided a shuttle ferry service for Army personnel between Port Said, Egypt, and Famagusta, Cyprus, as well as making occasional troop movement voyages to Libya and Malta.

Empire Peacemaker was finally laid up at Falmouth, Cornwall, in 1954. In July 1955 she was sold to a Belgian shipbreaker and was towed to Antwerp, and was broken up by Jos de Smedt in Burght in December.

=== Convoys ===
Empire Peacemaker sailed on the following convoys:

- OS/KMS-110KM — River Clyde to Gibraltar (February 1945)
- MKS-82G — Gibraltar to Liverpool (February 1945)
- OS/KMS-114KM — Southend to Gibraltar (March 1945)
- MKS-86G — Gibraltar to Liverpool (March 1945)
- OS/KMS-118KM — Clyde to Gibraltar (March 1945)
- MKS-90G — Gibraltar to Liverpool (March 1945)
- ON 296 — Liverpool to New York City (April 1945)
- HX 354 — New York City to Liverpool (May 1945)

== See also ==
- Scarborough Castle in Scarborough, North Yorkshire.
