= SS Empire Blessing =

Cargo ship which was built in 1943 by Bartram & Sons Ltd, Sunderland

History
- Name: Empire Blessing
- Owner: Ministry of War Transport
- Operator: W Runciman & Co Ltd
- Port of registry: (United Kingdom) Sunderland
- Builder: Bartram & Sons Ltd, Sunderland
- Yard number: 298
- Launched: 1 October 1943
- Completed: January 1944
- Out of service: 19 March 1945
- Identification: UK Official Number 180054; Code Letters GCTW
- Fate: Mined and sunk, 19 March 1945

General characteristics
- Tonnage: 7,064 GRT; 4,885 NRT
- Length: 431 ft (131.37 m)
- Beam: 56 ft 3 in (17.15 m)
- Depth: 35 ft 2 in (10.72 m)
- Propulsion: Triple expansion steam engine

Empire Blessing was a cargo ship which was built in 1943 by Bartram & Sons Ltd, Sunderland. She was built for the Ministry of War Transport (MoWT) and operated under the management of W Runciman & Co Ltd. In March 1945, Empire Blessing struck a mine in the Scheldt and sank.

== Description ==
Empire Blessing was a 7,064 GRT cargo ship. She was built by Bartram & Sons Ltd, Sunderland, as yard number 298. The ship was launched on 1 October 1943 and completed in January 1944. She was 431 feet (131.37 m) long, with a beam of 56 feet 3 inches (17.15 m) and a depth of 35 feet 2 inches (10.72 m). The ship was powered by a triple expansion steam engine which had cylinders of 24 1/2 inches (62 cm), 39 inches (99 cm) and 70 inches (180 cm) diameter by 48 inches (120 cm) stroke. It was manufactured by Worthington Simpson Ltd, Newark-on-Trent.

== Career ==
Empire Blessing was a member of a number of convoys during the Second World War.

ON 220

Convoy ON 220 sailed from Loch Ewe on 15 January 1944, bound for Canada and the United States. Empire Blessing set off in the convoy, but returned to Loch Ewe.

ONS 29

Convoy ONS 29 sailed from Oban on 13 February 1944, bound for Canada and the United States.

HX 291

Convoy HX 291 departed Halifax, Nova Scotia on 10 May 1944 and arrived at Liverpool on 27 May. Empire Blessing was carrying a cargo of sugar and was bound for the Inverness Firth to await further orders.

Empire Blessing was involved in the Normandy Landings in June 1944. On 19 March 1945, Empire Blessing struck a mine in the River Scheldt at Knocke, Belgium (51°24′N 3°17′E) and sank. On 13 February 1954, MV Seablue (formerly Empire Seablue) struck the wreck of Empire Blessing and was holed. Although attempts were made to beach Seablue, she sank 5 nautical miles (9.3 km) west south west of Vlissingen, Netherlands.

== Official Numbers and Code Letters ==
Official Numbers were a forerunner to IMO Numbers. Empire Blessing had the UK Official Number 180054 and used the Code Letters GCTW.
