= SS Empire Rest =

British convoy rescue ship

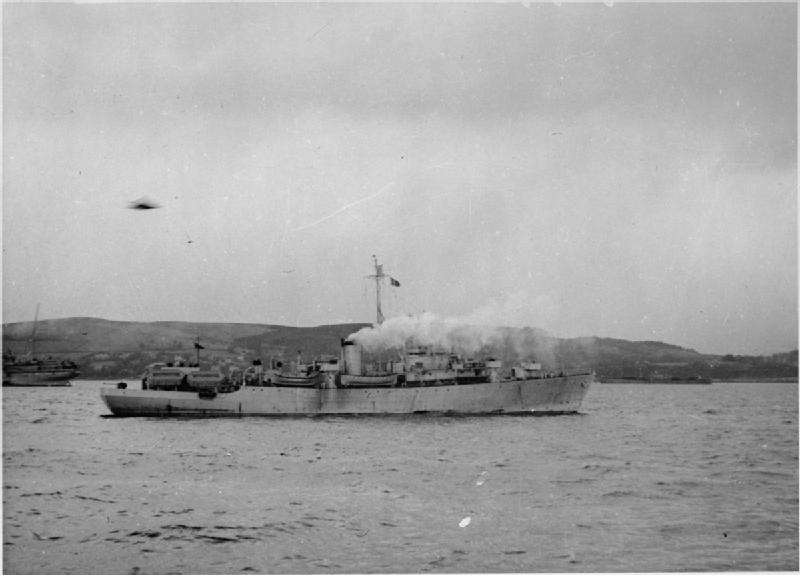
- Empire Rest

History

United Kingdom
- Name: SS Empire Rest
- Owner: Ministry of War Transport
- Operator: Ellerman City Line
- Ordered: 9 December 1942
- Builder: Ferguson Brothers (Port Glasgow) Ltd., Port Glasgow
- Laid down: 1943
- Launched: 19 June 1944, as Rayleigh Castle
- Completed: 26 October 1944, as Empire Rest
- In service: November 1944
- Out of service: July 1948
- Identification: Official number: 169516; Call sign: GJCW
- Fate: Sold for scrap, 1951

General characteristics
- Class & type: Castle-class corvette, converted to convoy rescue ship
- Tonnage: 1,333 GRT
- Length: 252 ft (76.8 m)
- Beam: 36 ft (11 m)
- Draught: 13 ft 5 in (4.1 m)
- Installed power: 2 × Admiralty 3-drum boilers; 2,880 ihp (2,148 kW)
- Propulsion: 2 shafts; 2 triple-expansion steam engines
- Speed: 16.5 knots (30.6 km/h; 19.0 mph)
- Armament: 1 × single 12 pdr (3 in (76 mm)) AA gun; 5 × single 20 mm (0.8 in) AA guns

SS Empire Rest was a convoy rescue ship built for the Royal Navy during World War II, originally laid down as the Castle-class corvette Rayleigh Castle. Post-war she served as a transport ship until 1948, was sold in 1951, and scrapped in 1952.

== Design and description ==
The Castle-class corvette was a stretched version of the preceding Flower class, enlarged to improve seakeeping and to accommodate modern weapons. The convoy rescue conversions had an overall length of 252 feet (76.8 m), a beam of 36 feet (11 m) and a draught of 13 feet 5 inches (4.1 m). They had a tonnage of 1,333 gross register tons (GRT). The ships were powered by a pair of triple-expansion steam engines, each driving one propeller shaft using steam provided by two Admiralty three-drum boilers. The engines developed a total of 2,880 indicated horsepower (2,150 kW) and gave a maximum speed of 16.5 knots (30.6 km/h; 19.0 mph). The convoy rescue ships were given an armament of a single 12-pounder (3 in (76 mm)) anti-aircraft (AA) guns and five 20-millimeter (0.8 in) Oerlikon AA guns on single mounts.

== Construction and career ==
The ship was ordered from Ferguson Brothers (Port Glasgow) Ltd. of Port Glasgow on 9 December 1942 as a Castle-class corvette. She was laid down in 1943 and launched on 19 June 1944 as Rayleigh Castle (K695), but further work was then cancelled, and she was completed as a convoy rescue ship on 26 October 1944. Under the ownership of the Ministry of War Transport, and managed by the Ellerman City Line, she sailed on eleven convoys between November 1944 and June 1945, but made no rescues. In November 1945 she sailed to Kiel to repatriate Royal Navy personnel, and was also employed as an transport ship in the Mediterranean in 1947, taking illegal Jewish immigrants from Haifa to internment camps on Cyprus in October that year.

In July 1948 she was laid up at Falmouth, Cornwall, and offered for sale in October 1949. She was eventually bought by Lloyds Albert Yard & Motor Boat Packet Services Ltd. in October 1951. She arrived at Thos. W. Ward of Briton Ferry, Wales, for scrapping on 6 June 1952.

=== Convoys ===
Empire Rest sailed on the following convoys:

- OS-95 km/KMS-69G – River Clyde to Gibraltar (November 1944)
- MKS-68G/SL-177MK – Gibraltar to Liverpool (November 1944)
- OS-100 km – Liverpool to Gibraltar (December 1944)
- MKS-72G – Gibraltar to Liverpool (December 1944)
- OS-104 km – Liverpool to Gibraltar (January 1945)
- MKS-76G – Gibraltar to Clyde (January 1945)
- ON 283 – Southend to New York City (February 1945)
- HX 341 – NYC to Liverpool (March 1945)
- ON 294 – Southend to NYC (April 1945)
- HX 352 – NYC to Liverpool (May 1945)
- ON 304 – Southend to NYC (June 1945)

== See also ==
- Rayleigh Castle in Rayleigh, Essex.

== Bibliography ==
- Goodwin, Norman (2007). Castle Class Corvettes: An Account of the Service of the Ships and of Their Ships' Companies. Liskeard, UK: Maritime Books. ISBN 978-1-904459-27-9.
- Lenton, H. T. (1998). British & Empire Warships of the Second World War. Annapolis, Maryland: Naval Institute Press. ISBN 1-55750-048-7.
- Rohwer, Jürgen (2005). Chronology of the War at Sea 1939–1945: The Naval History of World War Two (Third Revised ed.). Annapolis, Maryland: Naval Institute Press. ISBN 1-59114-119-2.
