= Lothringen (oil tanker) =

WWII-era oil tanker

- Papendrecht post war.

History

Netherlands
- Name: Papendrecht (1940–1941)
- Port of registry: Rotterdam
- Builder: Rotterdamsche Droogdok Maatschappij
- Yard number: 220
- Laid down: 18 April 1939
- Launched: 10 April 1940
- Fate: Requisitioned by Kriegsmarine

Germany
- Name: Lothringen
- Port of registry: Hamburg
- In service: May 1941
- Out of service: June 1941
- Fate: captured

United Kingdom
- Name: RFA Empire Salvage
- Port of registry: London
- In service: 1941
- Out of service: 1946
- Identification: United Kingdom Official Number 159160; Pennant Number A159; Code Letters BGTY
- Fate: returned to owners

Netherlands
- Name: Papendrecht
- Port of registry: Rotterdam
- In service: 1946
- Out of service: 15 April 1964
- Identification: Code Letters PGQZ
- Fate: broken up at Onomichi, Japan by Onomichi Zosen

General characteristics
- Type: Tanker
- Tonnage: 10,746 GRT, 6,400 NRT, 15,597 DWT
- Length: 496 ft 2 in (151.23 m) pp; 514 ft 3 in (156.74 m) oa
- Beam: 73 ft 0 in (22.25 m)
- Draught: 28 ft 3.75 in (8.63 m)
- Depth: 35 ft 5 in (10.80 m)
- Installed power: 8-cylinder, 4-stroke Stork-Hesselman diesel engine
- Propulsion: Screw
- Speed: 12.5 knots (23.2 km/h; 14.4 mph)
- Crew: 35
- Armament: 2 x 3.7 cm, 3 x 2 cm guns (as Lothringen)

Lothringen was an oil tanker ordered for Dutch shipowner Phs. Van Ommeren under the name Papendrecht in Rotterdam. On 16 May 1940, the Kriegsmarine seized her when the ship was still under construction and she was renamed Lothringen. She was commissioned on 23 January 1941. The ship became the property of Erste Deutsche Walfang-Gesellschaft of Hamburg who converted her into a support ship for naval operations by the German battleship Bismarck and cruiser Prinz Eugen in the Atlantic. On 15 June 1941, Lothringen was captured by the British light cruiser HMS Dunedin and taken into service of the Admiralty, crewed by the Royal Fleet Auxiliary. It was renamed Empire Salvage in 1941 and served the Allies for the remainder of the war. After the war, it was handed back to its owners.

== Description ==
The ship was 514 feet 3 inches (156.74 m) long overall (514 feet 3 inches (156.74 m) between perpendiculars), with a beam of 73 feet 3 inches (22.33 m). It had a depth of 35 feet 5 inches (10.80 m) and a draught of 28 feet 3.75 inches (8.63 m). It was assessed at 10,476 gross register tons (GRT), 6,400 net register tons (NRT).

The ship was powered by a four-stroke Single Cycle Single Acting diesel engine which had eight cylinders of 28.75 inches (73.0 cm) bore by 63 inches (160 cm) stroke. The engine was built by Gebroeders Stork &Co, N.V., Hengelo, Overijssel. It drove a single screw propeller. Rated at 3,700 brake horsepower (2,800 kW), the engine could propel the ship at 12 knots (22 km/h; 14 mph).

== Construction ==
Papendrecht was built as a tanker by the Rotterdam Droogdock Maatschappij, Rotterdam, South Holland for Van Ommeren's Scheepsvaart Maatschappij, Rotterdam. Yard number 220, it was laid down on 18 April 1939. The ship was launched on 19 April 1940. It was seized in May by the Kriegsmarine and renamed Lothringen. Completion was on 9 December 1940. The ship's port of registry was Hamburg.

== Axis service ==
=== Crew ===
Lothringen had a crew of 90, of which 45 were Kriegsmarine sailors. The rest were 35 sailors of the German mercantile marine. The senior naval officer aboard was the ship's doctor.

=== Early history ===
The sailors joined the Lothringen at Rotterdam. The guns were mounted and the ship was fueled. On 7 March 1941 the ship sailed for the port of Cherbourg, France, arriving in the afternoon of 8 March. Lothringen then visited Brest harbour, then Saint-Nazaire on 20 March followed by La Pallice on 11 May.

=== Outfitting and supplies ===
For re-supply of U-boats Lothringen took on:

- 32 torpedoes
- 1,000 tons of diesel oil for U-boats
- Fuel oil for surface craft, received from the tanker Rheum that taken together amounted to 11,000 tons.
- Provisions and fresh water.
- metal drums of lubricating oil for U-boats.

=== Capture ===
On 11 May 1941, Lothringen sailed from La Pallice, the deep-water port of La Rochelle, France. The ship was due to rendezvous with a U-boat on 17 June 1941, however on the early morning of the 15 June Lothringen was sighted at position 19°49′N 38°30′W, north west of the Cape Verde Islands, by Fairey Swordfish aircraft of the aircraft carrier HMS Eagle while on patrol as part of Operation Salvage looking for commerce raiders and U-boat supply ships in the South Atlantic. The Swordfish attacked with machine-gun fire and 250 lb (110 kg) bombs damaging the ship's lifeboats. The lack of seaworthy boats meant that the crew never scuttled the ship and Naval Intelligence at the time described it as the first time a ship surrendered to aircraft. The ship was captured on the same day at 17:00 by the Danae-class light cruiser HMS Dunedin.

When the Lothringen was captured, it provided valuable new techniques and design in replenishment at sea and specifically a new type of buoyant rubber hose.

== Allied service ==
Lothringen was taken by a prize crew to Bermuda. The ship was passed to the Ministry of War Transport and renamed Empire Salvage. Her port of registry was changed to London. The United Kingdom Official Number 159160 and Code Letters BGTY wer allocated. In September, it left Bermuda, crewed by the Royal Fleet Auxiliary and sailed to Halifax, Nova Scotia, Canada and in October sailed from there to the United Kingdom as part of Convoy HX 153. Empire Salvage was used in refuelling experiments with other British ships before fitting out with armament. Empire Salvage returned to Halifax and served there as "Station Oiler". For Operation Husky, Empire Salvage was in the Mediterranean refuelling ships in Algiers harbour and the Gulf of Salerno.

In late 1944, Empire Salvage transferred to the Far East supporting British operations there around Ceylon. The Empire Salvage was transferred back to the Dutch government but chartered by the Ministry of War Transport for continued operations.

== Post war ==
On 15 May 1946 Empire Salvage was handed back to Van Ommeren's Scheeps at Rotterdam. After a refit which included adding a boat deck amidships went into commercial service as Papendrecht.

The ship's port of registry was Rotterdam and the Code Letters PGQZ were allocated. From 23 November 1963 it was used as a storage tanker for molasses in Beira, Mozambique and the following year sold to Kinoshita & Co., Tokyo for breaking up, which occurred in February 1964.
