= ST Marinia =

Marinia was the name of a number of tugs.

- ST Marinia, the former Empire Aid
- ST Marinia, the former Empire Mary.
- ST Marinia, a 392 GRT tug built in 1955.
