= SS Empire Shelter =

World War II merchant ship of the United Kingdom

History

United Kingdom
- Name: Empire Shelter
- Owner: Ministry of War Transport
- Operator: Ellerman City Line
- Ordered: 19 January 1943
- Builder: George Brown & Co., Greenock
- Laid down: 1943, as HMS Barnard Castle (K594)
- Launched: 5 October 1944
- Completed: 17 April 1945, as Empire Shelter
- Out of service: 1954
- Identification: Official number: 169520; Call sign: GJCZ
- Fate: scrapped, 29 July 1955

General characteristics
- Class & type: Castle-class corvette, converted to convoy rescue ship
- Tonnage: 1,333 GRT
- Length: 252 ft (76.8 m)
- Beam: 36 ft (11 m)
- Draught: 13 ft 5 in (4.1 m)
- Installed power: 2 × Admiralty 3-drum boilers; 2,880 ihp (2,148 kW)
- Propulsion: 2 shafts; 2 triple-expansion steam engines
- Speed: 16.5 knots (30.6 km/h; 19.0 mph)
- Armament: 1 × single 12 pdr (3 in (76 mm)) AA gun; 5 × single 20 mm (0.8 in) AA guns

SS Empire Shelter was a convoy rescue ship built for the Royal Navy during World War II, originally laid down as the Castle-class corvette HMS Barnard Castle (pennant number K594). Completed a month before the end of the war in May 1945, she made a few short voyages before she was reduced to reserve. The ship later served as a barracks ship and then as a troopship before she was sold for scrap in 1955.

== Design and description ==
The Castle-class corvette was a stretched version of the preceding Flower class, enlarged to improve seakeeping and to accommodate modern weapons. The convoy rescue conversions had an overall length of 252 feet (76.8 m), a beam of 36 feet (11 m) and a draught of 13 feet 5 inches (4.1 m). They had a tonnage of 1,333 gross register tons (GRT). The ships were powered by a pair of triple-expansion steam engines, each driving one propeller shaft using steam provided by two Admiralty three-drum boilers. The engines developed a total of 2,880 indicated horsepower (2,150 kW) and gave a maximum speed of 16.5 knots (30.6 km/h; 19.0 mph). The convoy rescue ships were given an armament of a single 12-pounder (3 in (76 mm)) anti-aircraft (AA) guns and five 20-millimeter (0.8 in) Oerlikon AA guns on single mounts.

== Construction and career ==
The ship was ordered from George Brown & Co. of Greenock on 9 December 1942 as a Castle-class corvette. She was laid down in 1943 and launched on 5 October 1944 as Barnard Castle (K594), but further work was then cancelled, and she was completed as a convoy rescue ship on 17 April 1945. Under the ownership of the Ministry of War Transport, and managed by the Ellerman City Line, she sailed on six convoys over the next month, but made no rescues. On 22 May 1945 the ship was briefly placed in reserve before she became an accommodation ship for the Third Submarine Flotilla based in Holy Loch. Empire Shelter later served as a troopship. By 1955 she had been laid up in the River Fal and was sold for scrap that year. The ship arrived at Burght, Belgium, on 29 July to begin demolition.

== Bibliography ==
- Goodwin, Norman (2007). Castle Class Corvettes: An Account of the Service of the Ships and of Their Ships' Companies. Liskeard, UK: Maritime Books. ISBN 978-1-904459-27-9.
- Lenton, H. T. (1998). British & Empire Warships of the Second World War. Annapolis, Maryland: Naval Institute Press. ISBN 1-55750-048-7.
- Rohwer, Jürgen (2005). Chronology of the War at Sea 1939–1945: The Naval History of World War Two (Third Revised ed.). Annapolis, Maryland: Naval Institute Press. ISBN 1-59114-119-2.
