= Convoy rescue ship =

Ship designated to rescue survivors during WW2

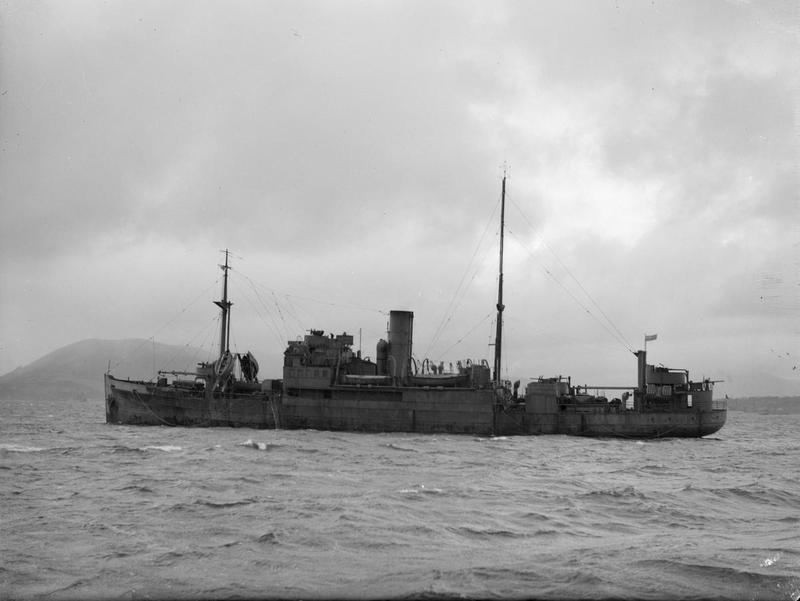
The convoy rescue ship, SS Gothland, in 1943.

During the Second World War, convoy rescue ships accompanied some Atlantic convoys to rescue survivors from ships that had been attacked. Rescue ships were typically small freighters with passenger accommodation converted to rescue service. This involved enlarging galley and food storage areas and providing berthing and sanitary facilities for approximately 150 men. Preparation for service included the installation of scrambling nets along the sides, and the substitution of boats suitable for open sea work for normal lifeboats. Rescue ships normally included a small operating room for an embarked naval doctor and sick bay staff.

== Service ==
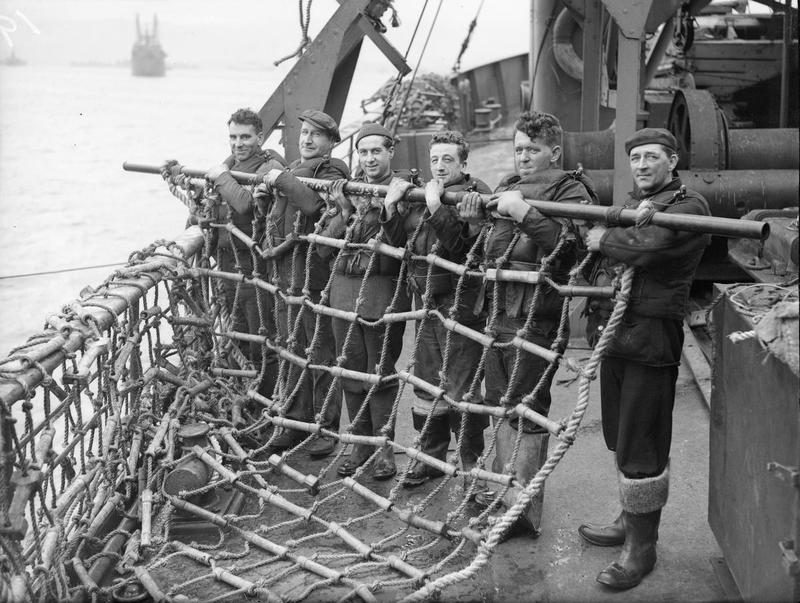
The crew of Gothland with a scramble net used to pick up survivors.

The first specially equipped rescue ship went into service in January 1941. When rescue ships were unavailable, large, ocean-going tugboats or converted trawlers were sometimes used. By the end of the war 30 rescue ships had been built or converted. They participated in 797 convoys and rescued 4,194 survivors from 119 ships. Seven rescue ships were lost, six to enemy action (three to U-boats and three to aircraft).

== Origins ==
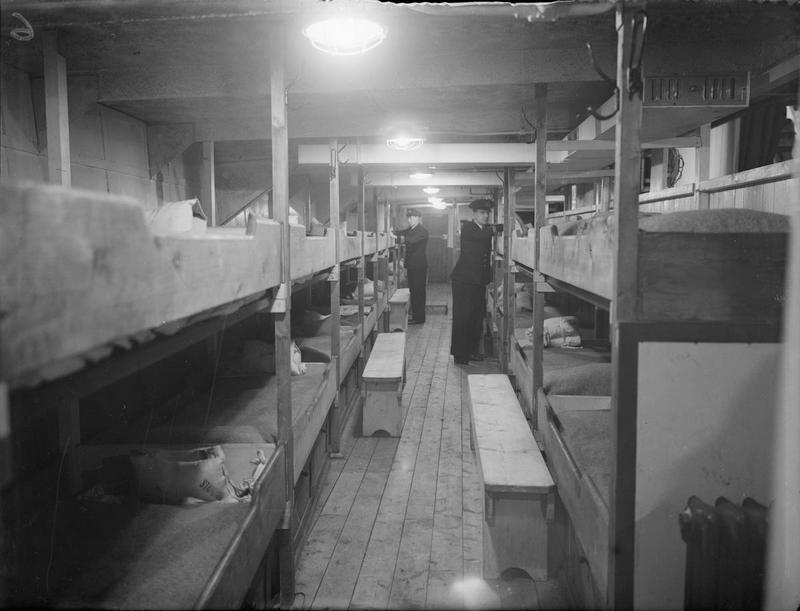
Survivors' quarters aboard a rescue ship in 1943.

In 1940 Admiral Sir Max Horton (later Commander-in-Chief Western Approaches Command) broached the idea of rescue ships with the Admiralty. The concept was to have merchant vessels that would accompany convoys but not carry cargo; they would instead have the role of saving the lives of seamen from ships sunk by enemy action. The rescue ship would take its position at the rear of one of the central columns of ships. From this position it could observe damaged ships falling astern of the convoy and quickly rendezvous to transfer survivors. The rescue ships would also be able to provide surgical or other treatment as required. This would free the cargo vessels of the convoy to continue on their way and escorts to focus on countering the attacking U-boats or aircraft.

The convoy rescue ship was a response to early experience. Each merchant ship in a convoy was assigned a station so that the convoy formation would consist of several columns of three to five ships. The lead ships of the columns were spaced at intervals of 1,000 yd (910 m) along a line perpendicular to the convoy course. Each ship in the column followed the ship ahead at a distance of 800 yd (730 m). The typical convoy would be approximately 5.0 to 6.2 mi (8 to 10 km) wide and 1.9 mi (3 km) long. The rescue plan for early convoys was to have the last ship of each column rescue survivors of other ships in that column. If the last ship in column was hit, the rescue task fell to the escorting warships. In practice, the escorts performed rescue tasks more often than the 25 per cent suggested by random hits on a four-ship column because some merchant ships refused to leave the protection of the convoy formation to fall back and remain a stationary target while rescuing survivors. Merchant ships were not well suited to manoeuvre to pick up survivors and those attempting rescue were hampered by lack of rescue equipment.

For the role the Admiralty sought out small, quick, manoeuvrable vessels; it drew many from among the Clyde Shipping Company's coastal passenger transports. The requisitioned passenger ships had a speed of 11 to 12 kn (20 to 22 km/h; 13 to 14 mph), which enabled them, after completing their rescue operations, to catch up with the convoys travelling at 10 kn (19 km/h; 12 mph). Although these vessels had not been built for the Atlantic or the Arctic, none was lost to Atlantic storms; one did ice-up and founder off the coast of Newfoundland.

The rescue ships were not hospital ships and so were legitimate targets. The Admiralty armed them with AA guns for protection when they were separated from the convoy and vulnerable to enemy attack. In addition to equipment for rescuing and treating survivors, rescue ships carried High-frequency direction finding (HF/DF, "Huff-Duff") to assist in the location of U-boats. The rescue ship's position at the rear of the convoy provided good triangulation in combination with the HF/DF installed on the escort leader typically patrolling in front of the convoy. The Rescue Ship Service was organised by Lieutenant-Commander L. F. Martyn RNVR, who later co-authored a book highlighting the successes and challenges of the rescue ships.

== List of convoy rescue ships ==
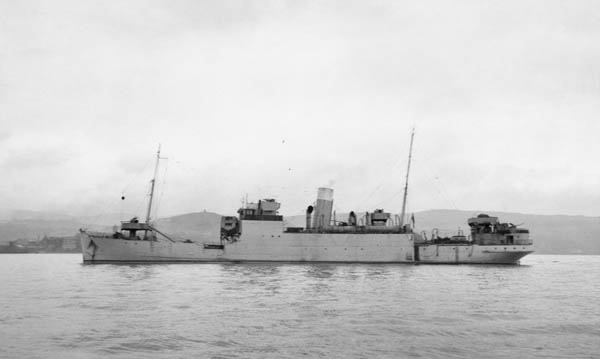
Rathlin

The rescue ships were:

- Aboyne 1,020 GRT, built 1937, in rescue service from 11 June 1943, sailed with 26 convoys, rescued 20 survivors.
- Accrington 1,678 GRT, built 1910, in rescue service from 26 July 1942, sailed with 36 convoys, rescued 141 survivors.
- Beachy 1,600 GRT, built 1936, in rescue service from January 1941, sailed with 5 convoys, sunk by aircraft 11 January 1941 while assigned to Convoy HG 49.
- Bury 1,686 GRT, built 1911, in rescue service from 27 December 1941, sailed with 48 convoys, rescued 237 survivors.
- Copeland 1,526 GRT, built 1923, in rescue service from 29 January 1941, sailed with 71 convoys, rescued 433 survivors.
- Dewsbury 1,686 GRT, built 1910, in rescue service from 29 September 1941, sailed with 43 convoys, rescued 5 survivors.
- Dundee 1,541 GRT, built 1934, in rescue service from 8 August 1943, sailed with 24 convoys, rescued 11 survivors.
- Eddystone 1,500 GRT, built 1927, in rescue service from 11 June 1943, sailed with 24 convoys, rescued 64 survivors.
- Empire Carpenter
- Empire Comfort 1,333 GRT, converted Castle-class corvette built 1945, in rescue service from 25 February 1945, sailed with 8 convoys.
- Empire Lifeguard 1,333 GRT, converted Castle-class corvette built 1944, in rescue service from 7 March 1945, sailed with 6 convoys.
- Empire Peacemaker 1,333 GRT, Castle-class corvette built 1945, in rescue service from 10 February 1945, sailed with 8 convoys, rescued 3 survivors.

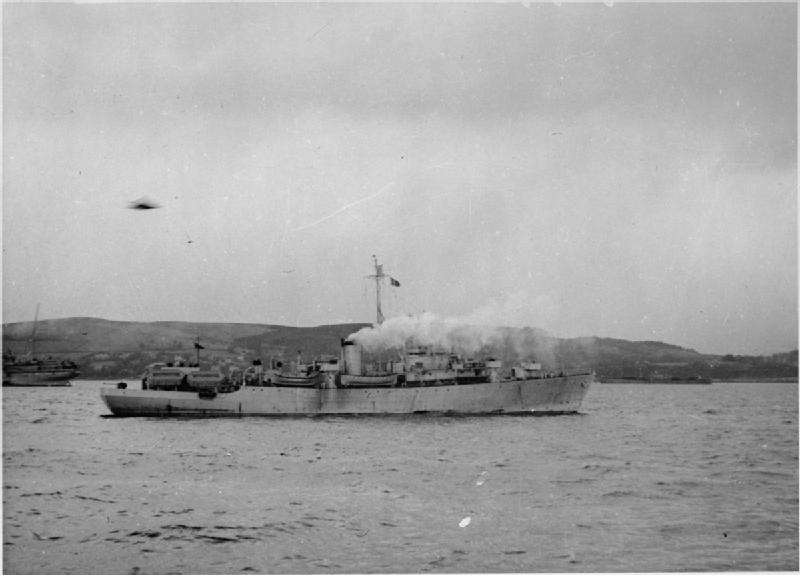
Empire Rest, a converted corvette.

- Empire Rest 1,327 GRT, Castle-class corvette built 1944, in rescue service from 12 November 1944, sailed with 11 convoys.
- Empire Shelter 1,336 GRT, Castle-class corvette built 1945, in rescue service from 16 April 1945, sailed with 6 convoys.
- Fastnet 1,415 GRT, built 1928, in rescue service from 7 October 1943, sailed with 25 convoys, rescued 35 survivors.
- Goodwin 1,569 GRT, built 1917, in rescue service from 28 April 1943, sailed with 25 convoys, rescued 133 survivors.
- Gothland 1,286 GRT, built 1932, in rescue service from 5 February 1942, sailed with 41 convoys, rescued 149 survivors.
- Hontestroom 1,875 GRT, built 1921, in rescue service from 11 January 1941, sailed with 12 convoys, rescued 86 survivors,withdrawn from rescue service May 1941.
- Inanda, 5,985 GRT, built 1925, one voyage as part of Convoy OB 119.
- Melrose Abbey 1,908 GRT, built 1929, in rescue service from 11 February 1942, sailed with 46 convoys including Convoy SC 121, rescued 85 survivors.
- Perth 2,258 GRT, built 1915, in rescue service from 5 May 1941, sailed with 60 convoys, rescued 455 survivors.
- Pinto 1,346 GRT, built 1928, in rescue service from 12 May 1942, sailed with 10 convoys, rescued 2 survivors, sunk with loss of 16 crewmen by U-482 8 September 1944 while assigned to Convoy HX 305.
- Rathlin 1,599 GRT, built 1936 painting, in rescue service from 2 October 1941, sailed with 47 convoys, including Convoy PQ 17, rescued 634 survivors.

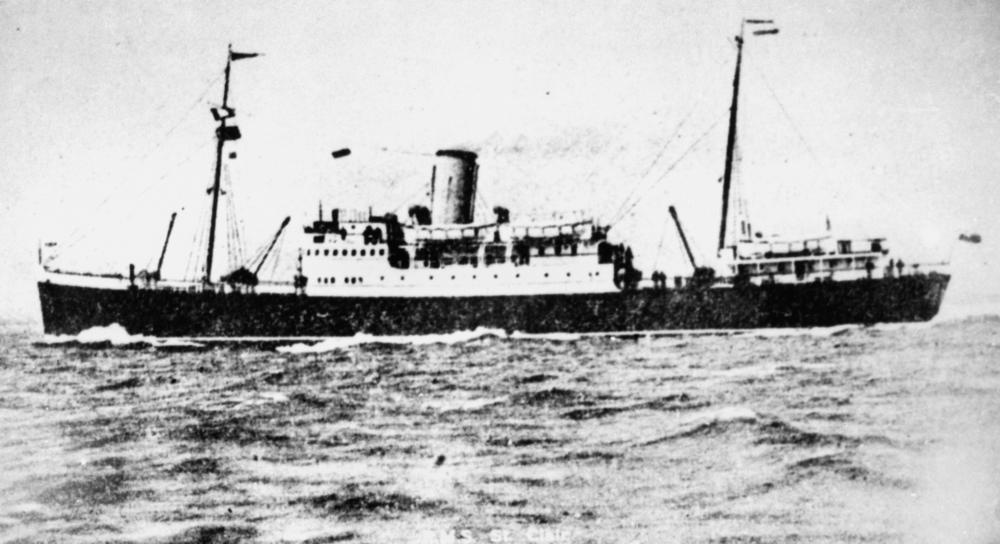
SS St Clair.

- St Clair 1,636 GRT, built 1937, in rescue service from 1 July 1944, sailed with 14 convoys.
- St Sunniva 1,368 GRT, built 1931, in rescue service from 7 December 1942, sailed with Convoy ON 158 and probably capsized from topside ice 23 January 1943. There were no survivors from the crew of 64.
- SS Stockport 1,683 GRT, built 1911, in rescue service from 22 October 1941, sailed with 16 convoys including Convoy SC 107, rescued 413 survivors, sunk by U-604 23 February 1943 while assigned to Convoy ON 166. There were no survivors from the crew of 63 and survivors previously rescued from other ships.
- Syrian Prince 1,989 GRT, built 1936, in rescue service from 18 November 1943, sailed with 19 convoys.
- Tjaldur 1,130 GRT, built 1916, in rescue service from 26 October 1941, sailed with 3 convoys, withdrawn from rescue service December 1941.
- Toward 1,571 GRT, built 1923, in rescue service from 24 October 1941, sailed with 45 convoys, rescued 341 survivors, sunk by U-402 7 February 1943 while assigned to Convoy SC 118. Two survivors and 54 crewmen were lost.
- Walmer Castle, 906 GRT, built 1936, in rescue service from 12 September 1941, sailed with Convoy OG 74 and rescued 81 survivors before being sunk by Focke-Wulf Fw 200 aircraft of I/KG 40 on 21 September 1941. Eleven crewmen and 20 of the survivors were lost.
- Zaafaran 1,567 GRT, built 1921 as SS Philomel, in rescue service from 23 March 1941, sailed with 26 convoys, rescued 220 survivors, sunk by aircraft with loss of one crewman during the battle of Convoy PQ 17 on 5 July 1942.
- Zamalek 1,565 GRT, built 1921 as SS Halcyon, in rescue service from 26 February 1941, sailed with 68 convoys, including Convoy PQ 17 and Convoy SC 130, rescued 665 survivors. Also participated in Convoy QP14.
