= List of Empire ships (A) =

== Empire Abbey ==
Empire Abbey was a 7,032 GRT refrigerated cargo ship built in 1943 by Shipbuilding Corporation Ltd, Newcastle upon Tyne and managed by Elder & Fyffes Ltd. Sold to Royal Mail Lines and renamed Teviot in 1946. Sold to Mullion & Co., Hong Kong in 1960 and renamed Ardellis. Sold to Hai An Shipping Co., Hong Kong and renamed Tung An in 1963. Scrapped in Taiwan in 1967.

== Empire Abercorn ==
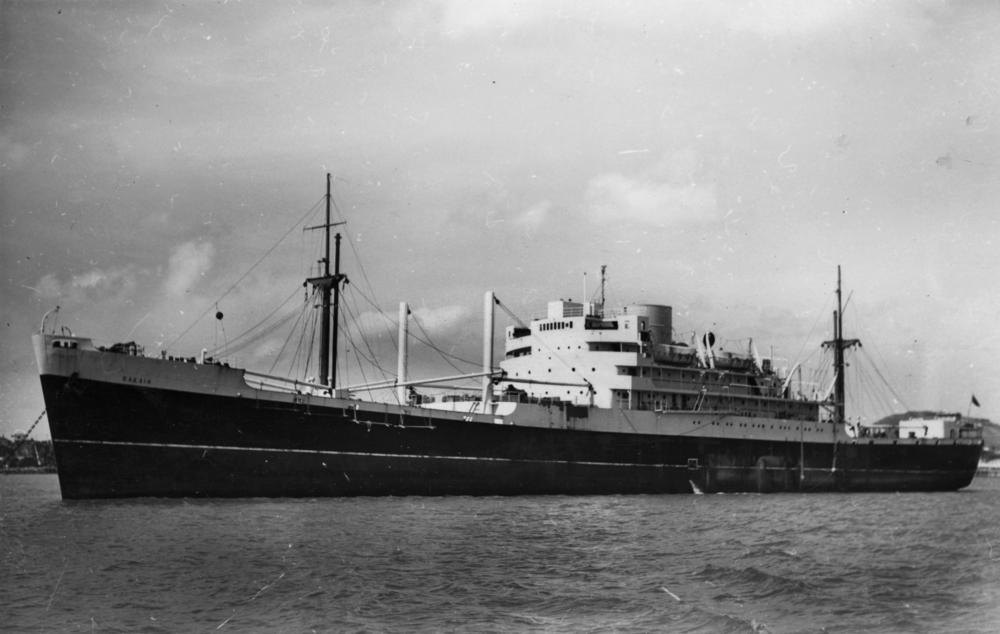
Rakaia, ex-Empire Abercorn

Empire Abercorn was an 8,563 GRT refrigerated cargo ship built in 1945 by Harland & Wolff, Belfast and managed by the New Zealand Shipping Company of London. Sold to New Zealand Shipping Co. in 1946 and renamed Rakaia. Sold to Federal Steam Navigation Co. in 1966. Scrapped in Hong Kong in 1971.

== Empire Ability ==
Empire Ability was a 7,603 GRT cargo ship built in 1931 by Deutsche Schiff- und Maschinenbau AG, Bremen. Originally owned by Hansa Line, Bremen and named Uhenfels. Captured by HMS Hereward off Freetown 5 November 1940. Renamed Empire Ability, managed by Elder Dempster Lines. Sunk by U-96 27 June 1941 at 23°50′N 21°10′W.

== Empire Ace ==
Empire Ace was a 276 GRT coastal tug built by Cochrane & Sons, Selby. Launched on 12 September 1942 and completed in December 1942. Sent to Malta where she was sunk in an air raid on 15 March 1944. Salvaged on 10 May and repaired. To the Admiralty in 1947 and renamed Diligent. To the Secretary of State for Defence in 1961 and renamed Empire Ace. On loan to the US Navy. To Ministry of Defence in December 1964. Ran aground at Campbeltown on 11 November 1968 and abandoned. Refloated in June 1969 but a constructive total loss. Scrapped at Campbeltown in 1971.

== Empire Activity (I) ==
Empire Activity was a 5,287 GRT cargo ship built in 1919 by Swan Hunter and Wigham Richardson Ltd., Wallsend. Originally named Belgian and owned by Frederick Leyland Line, Liverpool. Sold in 1934 to Achille Lauro, Naples and renamed Amelia Lauro. Seized at Immingham 10 June 1940. Renamed Empire Activity in 1941, managed by Galbraith, Pembroke & Co. Wrecked off Newfoundland 3 October 1943.

== Empire Activity (II) ==
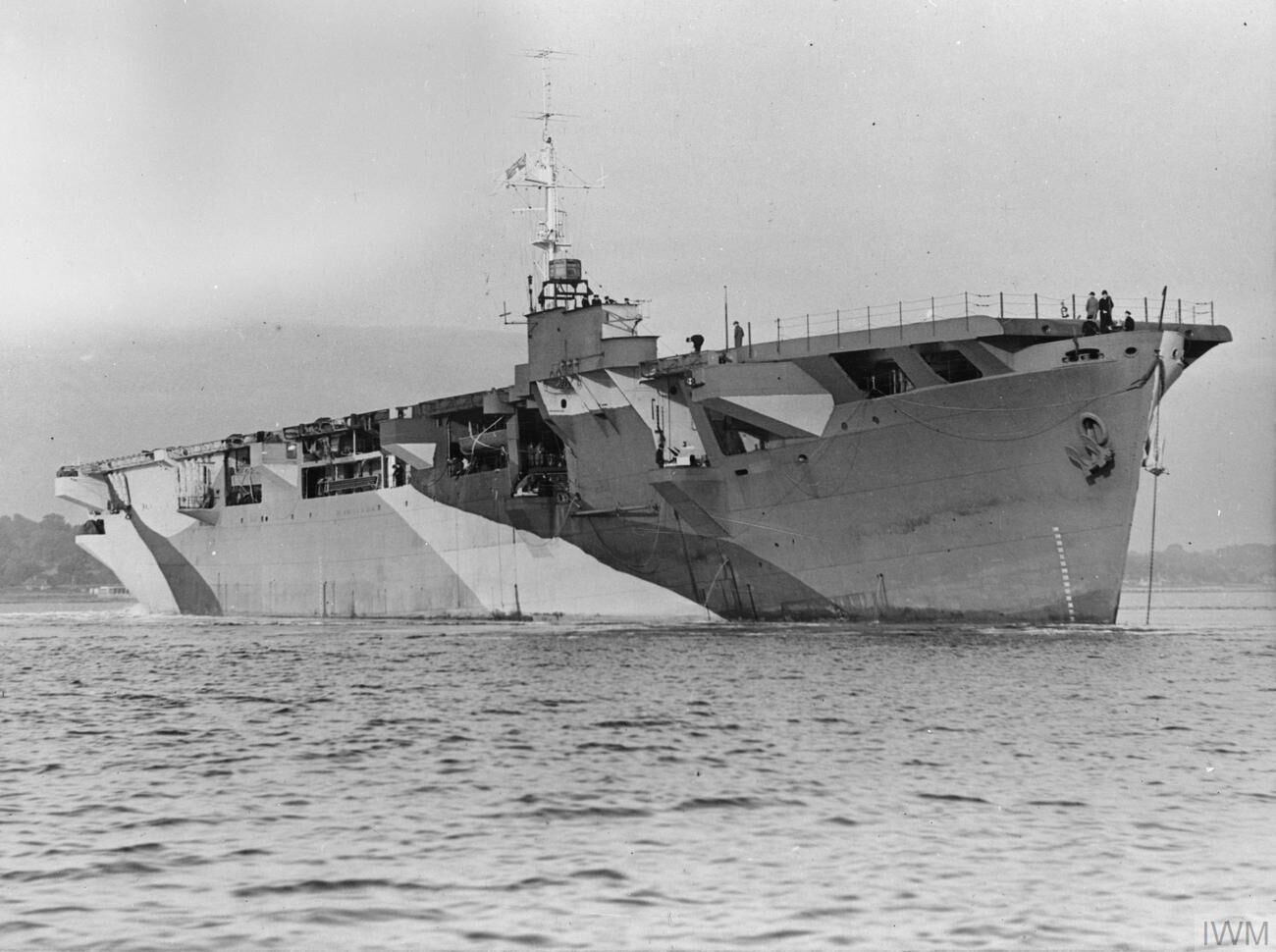
HMS Activity, ex-Empire Activity

Empire Activity was a 14,250 GRT refrigerated cargo ship built 1940–42 by Caledon Shipyards, Dundee. She was laid down as Telemachus and requisitioned as Empire Activity. Completed as escort aircraft carrier HMS Empire Activity, quickly renamed HMS Activity. Later converted to merchantman MV Breconshire, scrapped in Mihara, Japan in April 1967

== Empire Addison ==
Empire Addison was a 7,010 GRT cargo ship built in 1940 by Lithgows Ltd., Port Glasgow. Operated by T & J Harrison, Liverpool. Sold in 1945 to T & J Harrison and renamed Philosopher. Sold in 1959 to Concordia Shipping Corporation, Liberia and renamed Aiolos. Scrapped in Hong Kong in 1963.

== Empire Aden ==
Empire Aden was a 7,308 GRT cargo ship built in 1945 by Bartram & Sons Ltd., Sunderland and managed by H Hogarth & Sons. Management passed to A Weir & Co., London in 1946. Sold to A Weir & Co. in 1948 and renamed Etivebank. Sold to Alcyone Shipping Co., London in 1956 and renamed Alcyone Fortune. Sold to Pan Norse Steamship Co., Panama in 1958 and renamed Northern Venture. Ran aground off Okinawa 9 June 1967 and declared a total loss.

== Empire Admiral ==
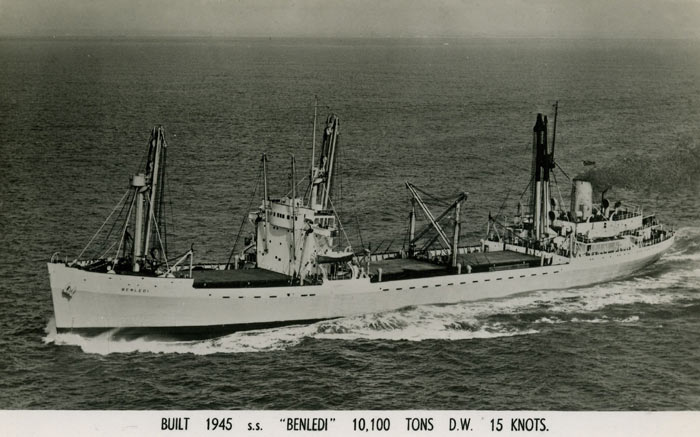
Benledi, ex-Empire Admiral (1951)

Empire Admiral was a 7,842 GRT cargo ship built in 1945 by Vickers-Armstrongs Ltd, Barrow in Furness and managed by Alfred Holt & Co. Management passed to Glen Line in 1945 and to Kaye, Son & Co., London in 1947. Sold in 1947 to Dalhousie Steam and Motorship Co and renamed Peter Dal. Sold in 1951 to Ben Line Steamers, Edinburgh, passing to E G Thomson Ltd in 1953. Sold in 1963 to Andros Navigation Co, Nassau and renamed Andros Tommeno. Sold to Frank Shipping Co., Liberia in 1963 and then to Unique Maritime Corporation, Liberia in 1966 and renamed Unique Carrier. Scrapped in Taiwan in 1969.

== Empire Adur ==
Empire Adur was a 1,479 GRT cargo ship built in 1920 by J. F. Duthie & Company, Seattle. Originally named Griffdu, owned by Universal Steamship & Barge Co., Seattle. Sold to The Charles Nelson Co., San Francisco in 1925 and then to the Union Lumber Co., San Francisco in 1935 and renamed Noyo. Sold in 1940 to Thia Niyom Panich Co., Bangkok and renamed Nang Suang Nawa. To MoWT in 1942 and renamed Empire Adur, managed by Singapore Straits Steamship Co. Sold to Thai Maritime Navigation Co., Bangkok in 1948 and renamed Nang Suan Nawa. Lost at sea in 1955 whilst being towed by tug Albacore en route to Hong Kong for scrapping.

== Empire Adventure ==
Empire Adventure was a 5,145 GRT cargo ship built in 1921 by Northumberland Shipbuilding Co Ltd, Sunderland. Originally named Eastney, owned by Romney Steamship Co. Ltd., London. Sold in 1924 to L Dreyfus et Compagnie, France and renamed Germaine L-D. sold in 1931 to Società Anonima di Navigazione Corrado, Genoa and renamed Andrea. Seized off Newcastle upon Tyne in June 1940 and renamed Empire Adventure. Sunk by U-138 on 20 September 1940 off Islay.

== Empire Advocate ==
Empire Advocate was a 5,787 GRT cargo ship built in 1913 by Joh. C. Tecklenborg AG, Wesermünde. Originally named Solfels, owned by Hansa Line, Bremen. Taken as a War prize in 1919, managed by H Hogarth & Sons. Sold in 1920 to Lancashire Shipping Co. Sold in 1932 to Achille Lauro & Co., Naples and renamed Angelina Lauro. Seized in Liverpool 23 June 1940 and renamed Empire Advocate, managed by Galbraith, Pembroke & Co., London. Scrapped at Bo'ness in 1945.

== Empire Aid ==
Empire Aid was a 479 GRT oceangoing tug built by Clelands (Successors) Ltd, Wallsend. Launched on 27 November 1943 and completed in April 1944. Managed by Overseas Towage & Salvage Co for MoWT. Sold in 1952 to Overseas Towage & Salvage Co and renamed Marinia. Sold in 1954 to Kuwait Oil Co. Ltd and renamed Huda. Sold in 1965 to H H Deeb, Kuwait. Scrapped in Basrah, Iraq in 1967.

== Empire Airman (I) ==
Empire Airman was a 6,561 GRT cargo ship built in 1915 by Stabilimento Tecnico Triestino, Trieste. Originally named Teodo and owned by the Italian Government Ministry of Transport. Passed to the Ministry of Marine in 1924 and renamed Barbana. Sold in 1936 to Società Anonima di Navigazione Garibaldi, Genoa and renamed Barbana G. Captured off Newcastle upon Tyne 10 June 1940. To MoWT, renamed Empire Airman. Torpedoed and sunk by U-100 on 21 September 1940 at approximately 54°00′N 18°00′W.

== Empire Airman (II) ==
Empire Airman was a 9,813 GRT tanker built in 1942 by Sir J Laing & Sons Ltd, Sunderland. Managed by Eagle Oil Co. Sold in 1946 to Eagle Oil & Transport Co. and renamed San Wenceslao. Scrapped in Hong Kong in 1959.

== Empire Albany ==
Empire Albany was a 306 GRT coaster built by Richards Ironworks Ltd., Lowestoft. Sold in 1946 to Mrs P Dowds, Ireland. Departed Port Talbot on 20 November 1946 for Rosslare but never arrived. Presumed to have foundered.

== Empire Albatross ==
Empire Albatross was a 4,714 GRT cargo ship built in 1919 by Bethlehem Steel Corporation, Sparrows Point. Originally named Hoxie and operated by United States Shipping Board, Baltimore. Passed to United States Maritime Commission in 1937 and then to MoWT in 1940 and renamed Empire Albatross. Managed by Sir W Reardon Smith & Sons and then by Dene Management Co. Sold in 1942 to the Belgian Government and renamed Belgian Fisherman, managed by L Dens et Compagnie, Antwerp. Sold in 1946 to Compagnie Royale Belgique-Argentine SA and renamed Belgique. Sold in 1950 to Hendrik Fisser AG, Emden and renamed Martha Hendrik Fisser. Scrapped in Hamburg in 1958.

== Empire Albion ==
Empire Albion was a 9,875 GRT cargo liner which was built by Caledon Shipbuilding & Engineering Co. Ltd., Dundee. Launched on 23 May 1944 and completed in September 1944 as Terbroch for the Netherlands Government. Sold in 1946 to Nederlands Amerikaansche Stoomboot Maatschappij, Rotterdam and renamed Eemdijk. Sold in 1960 to Orient Mid-East Line and renamed Orient Merchant. Ran aground in Lake Erie near Port Colborne, Ontario, Canada. Refloated on 8 May 1965, declared a constructive total loss. Sold to Compagnia Navigazione Labrador S.A., Panama and renamed Zambezi. Arrived at Kaohsiung, Taiwan for breaking on 19 November 1967.

== Empire Alde ==
Empire Alde was a 3,675 GRT refrigerated cargo ship built in 1934 by Bremer Vulkan Schiff- und Maschinenbau, Bremen. Originally named Pelikan and operated by F. Laeisz, Hamburg. To German Navy in 1940. Seized at Brunsbüttel in 1945. To MoWTin 1946 and renamed Empire Alde, managed by Kaye, Sons & Co. Sold to Elders & Fyffes Ltd in 1946 and renamed Pelikan. Renamed Pacuare in 1947 and scrapped at Troon in 1959.

== Empire Alderney ==
Empire Alderney was a 288 GRT coastal tanker built in 1944 by J Harker Ltd., Knottingley. Sold in 1946 to Norsk Tankanlaeg A/S, Norway and renamed MIL 50. Sold in 1955 to Partenrederei Max S, Germany and renamed Max S. Sold in 1958 to Marina Mercante Nicaragüense, Nicaragua.Sold in 1959 to Compagnia Maritima Mundial, Nicaragua. Sold in 1980 to Trafford Holdings Ltd., Cayman Islands.

== Empire Aldgate ==
Empire Aldgate was a 3,485 GRT heavy lift ship built in 1945 by William Gray & Co. Ltd., West Hartlepool. Sold in 1946 to the Rodney Steamship Co., London and renamed Thackeray. Sold in 1951 to Silvertown Services Ltd and renamed Sugar Refiner. Sold in 1958 to Valck & Monkton, Valparaíso and renamed San Patrico. Sold in 1962 to World Maritime Co., Liberia who sold her in 1965 to Altair Maritime Corporation, Liberia. Abandoned at Tarragona in 1965 and scrapped at Cartagena in 1967.

== Empire Alfred ==
Empire Alfred was a 242 GRT oceangoing tug built by J S Watson Ltd., Gainsborough. Launched on 5 September 1944 and completed in October 1944. Sold in 1946 to the French Government and renamed Muscle. Sold in 1951 to Les Abeilles Compagnie des Remorquage Sauvignon, Le Havre and renamed Abeille No. 22. Scrapped at Le Havre in June 1969.

== Empire Allenby ==
Empire Allenby was a 9,904 GRT cargo ship built by J L Thompson & Sons Ltd, Sunderland. Managed by Prince Line. Sold in 1946 to Union Castle Mail Steamship Co. Ltd. and renamed Drakensberg Castle. Scrapped in Hong Kong in 1959.

== Empire Alliance ==
Empire Alliance was a 9,909 GRT tanker built in 1945 by Sir J Laing & Sons Ltd, Sunderland and managed by Anglo-Saxon Petroleum Co., London. Sold in 1945 to British Tanker Co and renamed British Dragoon. Scrapped at Blyth in 1962.

== Empire Almond ==
Empire Almond was a 6,860 GRT cargo ship built in 1941 by Taikoo Dockyard & Engineering Co Ltd, Hong Kong and managed by W Runciman & Co. Ltd. Management passed to Coolham Steamship Co. Ltd. in 1943. Sold to Kaye, Son & Co., London in 1946 and renamed Marquita. Renamed Marshland in 1951, sold in 1960 to Polish Steamship Company, Szczecin and renamed Huta Zgoda. Converted to a floating warehouse in 1969 and renamed MP-Zozie-12 Scrapped at Faslane in 1978.

== Empire Amethyst ==
Empire Amethyst was an 8,032 GRT tanker built in 1941 by Furness Shipbuilding Ltd, Haverton Hill-on-Tees. Torpedoed and sunk by U-154 on 13 April 1942 at 17°40′N 74°50′W.

== Empire Andrew ==
Empire Andrew was a 138 GRT estuary tug built by R Dunston Ltd., Thorne. Launched on 27 November 1943 and completed in February 1944. Sold in 1948 to the Polish Government and renamed Dzik. On shipping registers until 1961 when relegated to port work only, scrapped at an unknown date.

== Empire Anglesey ==
Empire Anglesey was a 288 GRT coastal tanker built in 1945 by J Harker Ltd., Knottingley. Sold in 1946 to A/S Tankskibsrederiet, Köpenhamn, Denmark and renamed Abadan. Sold in 1961 to Celtic Coasters Ltd., Dublin, Ireland and renamed Renee J. Scrapped in Cork in 1969.

== Empire Ann ==
Empire Ann was a 232 GRT coastwise tug built in 1942 by A Hall & Co. Ltd., Aberdeen. Launched on 9 January 1943 and completed in April 1943. Sent to Malta during the Second World War. Sold in 1947 to United Steel Companies, Sheffield and operated by Workington Harbour & Dock Board, renamed Solway. Arrived for scrapping at Fleetwood on 21 April 1977.

== Empire Annan ==
Empire Annan was a 2,385 GRT cargo ship built in 1935 by Schichau F GmbH, Elbląg. Originally owned by Kohlen-Import & Poseidon Co., Königsberg and named Masuren. Seized in 1945 at Copenhagen and renamed Empire Annan. To United States Maritime Commission in 1947 and sold to Fanmaur Shipping & Trading Co., New York. Sold in 1950 to T N Ephianiades, Greece and renamed Thomas N Ephiphaniades. Sold in 1952 to J Blumenthal, Hamburg and renamed Helga Boge. Sold in 1960 to Koehn & Bohlmann Rederei, Hamburg and renamed Fuhlsbuttel. Scrapped at Bremerhaven in 1964.

== Empire Antelope ==
Empire Antelope was a 4,753 GRT cargo ship built in 1919 by Todd Drydock and Construction Company, Tacoma. Originally owned by United States Shipping Board and named Ophis. Renamed Bangu in 1928. To United States Maritime Commission in 1937 and MoWT in 1941, renamed Empire Antelope. Torpedoed and sunk by U-402 on 2 February 1942 at 52°26′N 45°22′W.

== Empire Antigua ==
Empire Antigua was a 7,331 GRT cargo ship built in 1946 by Shipbuilding Corporation Ltd, Newcastle upon Tyne. Managed by Dodd, Thompson & Co. Sold in 1946 to the South Georgia Co. and renamed Culross. Laid up at Gairloch in 1958. Sold in 1960 to Navigazione y de Comercio Apolo Ltda, Lebanon and renamed Akastos. Reflagged to Greece in 1961 and Cyprus in 1966. Sold in 1967 to Blue Cross Transocean Co., Athens. Renamed Marina in 1968 and scrapped in Hamburg.

== Empire Anvil ==
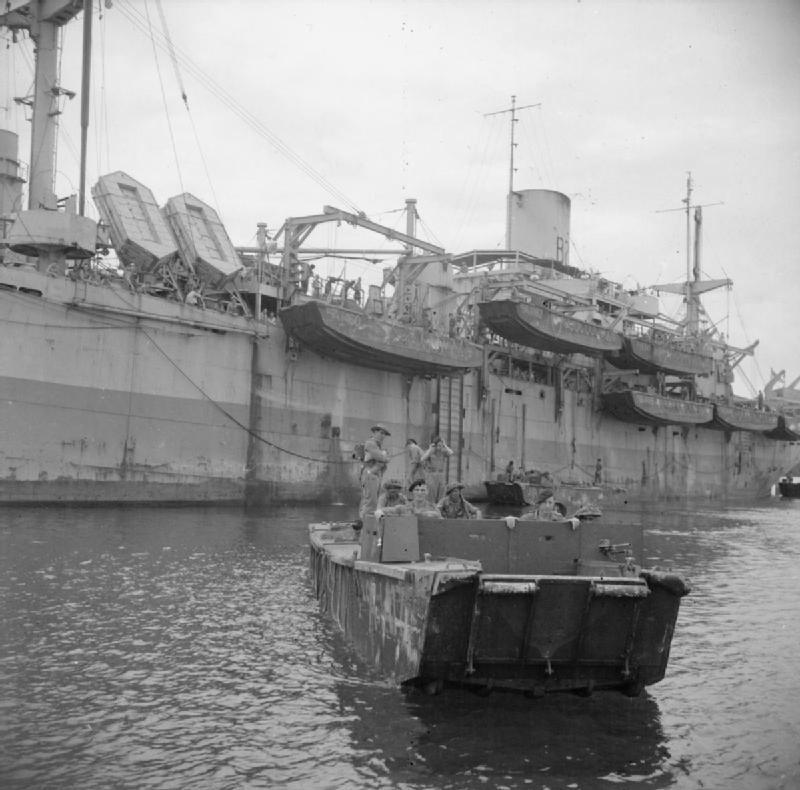
A Landing Craft Assault (LCA) leaving HMS Rocksand

Empire Anvil was a 7,177 GRT landing ship built in 1943 by the Consolidated Steel Corporation in Wilmington, Los Angeles. Laid down as Cape Argos and completed as Empire Anvil. To MoWT in 1944, managed by Furness, Withy & Co. To the Royal Navy in 1944 as HMS Rocksand. Returned to MoWT in 1946 and renamed Empire Anvil, again managed by Furness, Withy & Co. To United States Maritime Commission in 1947. Renamed Cape Argos in 1948. The proposed sale to China in 1948 was postponed and she was renamed Empire Anvil in 1950 and laid up in James River, Virginia. Sold in 1960 to China Merchants Steam Navigation Co., Taiwan, and renamed Hai Ya. Sold in 1973 to Yangming Marine Transport, Taiwan. Scrapped at Keelung in 1974.

== Empire Archer ==
Empire Archer was a 7,031 GRT cargo ship built in 1942 by Caledon Shipbuilding & Engineering Company, Dunbar and managed by Raeburn & Verel Ltd. Sold in 1946 to H Hogarth & Sons, Glasgow and renamed Baron Murray. Sold in 1959 to Cathay Shipping Corporation, Panama, and renamed Cathay. Scrapped at Yokosuka in 1963.

== Empire Ardle ==
Empire Ardle was a 2,798 GRT cargo ship laid down by Flensburger Schiffbau-Gesellschaft, Flensburg as Sasbeck and seized uncompleted at Lübeck. To MoWT in 1946 as Empire Ardle. Sold to Rodney Steamship Co., London in 1947 and renamed Lewis Hamilton. Sold in 1950 to C H Abramsen, Stockholm and renamed Indus. Sold in 1968 to C Hultstrom, Stockholm and then to Seabird Navigation Incorporated, Liberia, and renamed Falcon. Sold in 1969 to Lilly Navigation Corporation, Panama and renamed Sea Falcon. Sold to Seabird Navigation Incorporated in 1970, scrapped at Avilés in 1971.

== Empire Ariel ==
Empire Ariel was a 129 GRT estuary tug built in 1942 by R Dunston Ltd., Thorne. Launched on 20 September 1942 and completed in November 1942. Sold in 1947 to Compagnie Rem. Les Tuyaux Bleus, Bordeaux and renamed Ariel. Sold in 1951 to J Lasry & Sons, Oran and renamed Jolasry 5. Sold in 1956 to D Tripcovich & Co., Italy, and renamed Velox. Sold in 1976 to Marittima Farsoura, Italy, renamed Manuella F and converted to a barge.

== Empire Arnold ==
Empire Arnold was a 7,045 GRT cargo ship built in 1942 by William Gray & Co Ltd, West Hartlepool. Managed by Sir R Ropner & Co. Torpedoed and sunk by U-155 on 4 August 1942 at 10°45′N 52°30′W.

== Empire Arquebus ==
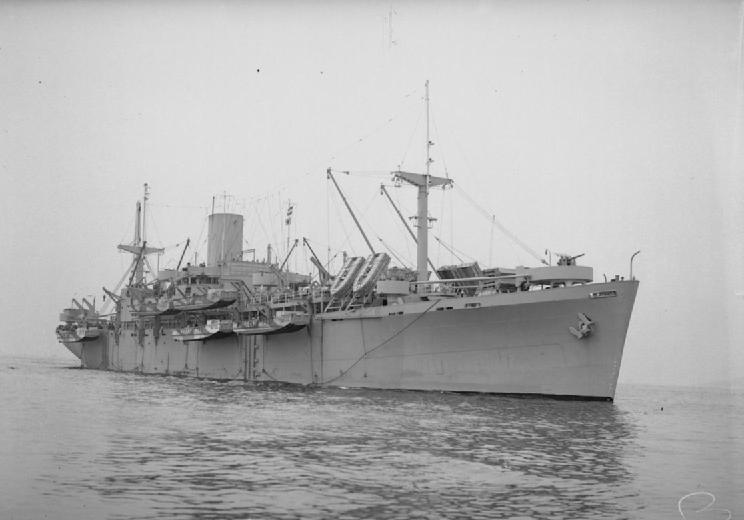
HMS Cicero, ex-Empire Arquebus

Empire Arquebus was a 7,177 GRT landing ship laid down as Cape St Vincent for United States War Shipping Administration and completed in 1944 by Consolidated Steel Corporation, Wilmington as Empire Arquebus. Managed by Donaldson, Brothers and Black Ltd., To Royal Navy in 1944 and renamed HMS Cicero. Returned to MoWT in 1945 and renamed Empire Arquebus under the management of Donaldson, Brothers and Black Ltd. To United States War Shipping Administration in 1946. Sold that year to Société Misr. de Navigatione Maritime, Egypt and converted to a passenger ship, renamed Al Sudan. Sold in 1959 to Egyptian Government and then sold in 1961 to United Arab Maritime Co., United Arab Republic. Sold in 1973 to Egyptian Navigation Co., Egypt. Arrived in Suez in 1980 for scrapping but still extant in 1984.

== Empire Arrow ==
Empire Arrow was a 3,766 GRT intermediate tanker built in 1945 by J L Thompson & Sons, Sunderland. Sold in 1947 to British Tanker Co. and renamed British Bugler. Sold in 1958 to Compagnie d'Armement Maritime, Djibouti and renamed Montmajour. Sold in 1963 to Greek Tanker Shipping Co., Piraeus and renamed Mantinia. Laid up in Piraeus in 1978, scrapped at Kynosoúra in 1981.

== Empire Arthur ==
Empire Arthur was a 780 GRT coastal tanker built in 1942 by Grangemouth Dockyard Co. Ltd. Capsized and sank off Freetown 22 November 1943 and declared a total loss. Salvaged in 1948 and repaired, becoming Merula, owned by Ape Azionara Petroliere, Italy. Sold in 1951 to F T Everard & Sons and renamed Adherity. Scrapped at Nieuw Lekkerkerk, Netherlands in 1962.

== Empire Arun ==
Empire Arun was a 5,490 GRT cargo ship built in 1922 by Stabilimento Tecnico Triestino, Trieste. Originally owned by Lloyd Triestino and named Savoia. Captured on 11 February 1941 by Royal Navy at Kismayu, Italian Somaliland. To MoWT in 1942 and renamed Empire Arun, managed by Union-Castle Mail Steamship Co. Sold in 1947 to Goulandris Bros., London and renamed Granlake. Sold in 1949 to Compagnia Maritima del Este, Panama and renamed Dryad. sold in 1951 to Hikari Kisen K.K., Tokyo and renamed Shiranesan Maru. Sold in 1953 to Mitsi Kinkai Kisen K.K., Tokyo and then in 1955 to Hokuyo Suisan K.K., Tokyo. Sold in 1962 to Nichiro Gyogyo K.K., Tokyo and renamed Dainichi Maru. Scrapped at Utsumi-Machi, Japan in 1969.

== Empire Ash ==
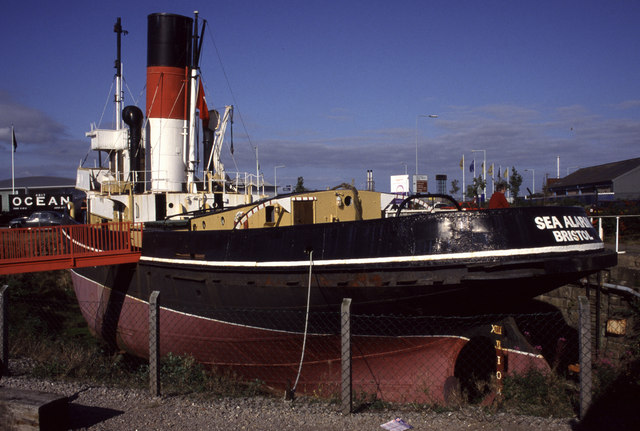
Tug Sea Alarm, ex-Empire Ash (1997)

Empire Ash was a 263 GRT oceangoing tug built in 1941 by John Crown & Sons Ltd, Sunderland. Launched on 13 August 1941 and completed in October 1941. Sold in 1946 to Clyde Shipping Co Ltd and renamed Flying Fulmar. sold in 1956 to C J King & Sons Ltd, Bristol and renamed Sea Alarm. To Welsh Industrial and Maritime Museum in 1973, restored 1978.

Scrapped upon the closure of the museum, but engine saved. Questions were asked by the Select committee on Welsh Affairs about the scrapping of the tug as there was public outcry at the time.

== Empire Asquith ==
Empire Asquith was a 7,082 GRT cargo ship built in 1944 by Shipbuilding Corporation Ltd, Newcastle upon Tyne. Managed by R Chapman & Son. Management passed to Counties Ship Management Ltd., London in 1946, and Empire Asquith was sold to them in 1947, renamed Brockley Hill. Sold in 1951 to Crest Shipping Co., Nassau, and renamed Starcrest. Sold in 1957 to Compagnia de Navigazione Phoenix, Panama and renamed Argosy, flying the Liberian flag. Sold in 1958 to Codemar Compagnia de Empresas Maritimas, Panama. Sold in 1960 to Ipar Transport Co., Istanbul and renamed Nezihi Ipar. Laid up in Istanbul in 1962 and scrapped there in 1970.

== Empire Athelstan ==
Empire Athelstan was a 7,803 GRT heavy lift ship built in 1946 by Vickers-Armstrongs Ltd., Barrow in Furness and initially managed by P Henderson & Co. passing to Alfred Holt & Company later in 1946. Sold in 1947 to Ben Line Steamers and renamed Benalbanach. To Ministry of Transport in 1965, managed by British India Steam Navigation Co. To Board of Trade Sea Transport Branch in 1969 and then sold to Mercur Shipping Enterprise, Panama and renamed Dragon Castle. Sold in 1975 to Cuatebol Shipping S.A., Panama. Scrapped at Split, Yugoslavia in 1975.

== Empire Atoll ==
Empire Atoll was a 692 GRT refrigerated coaster built in 1941 by Ardrossan Dockyard Ltd, Ardrossan. The only refrigerated coaster built during the war. Capacity 50,604 cubic feet (1,432.9 m^{3}) refrigerated cargo space. Launched on 12 July 1941 and completed in 1942. Sold in 1946 to Coast Lines Ltd., and renamed Hadrian Coast. Sold in 1967 to E Davidou, Greece. Ran aground at Mehidia, Morocco on 10 January 1970 after suffering engine trouble and declared a total loss.

== Empire Attendant ==
Empire Attendant was an 8,441 GRT passenger ship built in 1921 by Barclay, Curle & Co., Glasgow. Originally owned by British India Steam Navigation Co. and named Domala. Beached in the Solent 2 February 1940 after being bombed and set on fire. Rebuilt as a cargo ship for MoWT and renamed Empire Attendant, managed by Andrew Weir & Co Ltd (Bank Line). Torpedoed and sunk on 15 July 1942 by U-582 at 23°48′N 21°51′W.

== Empire Audacity ==
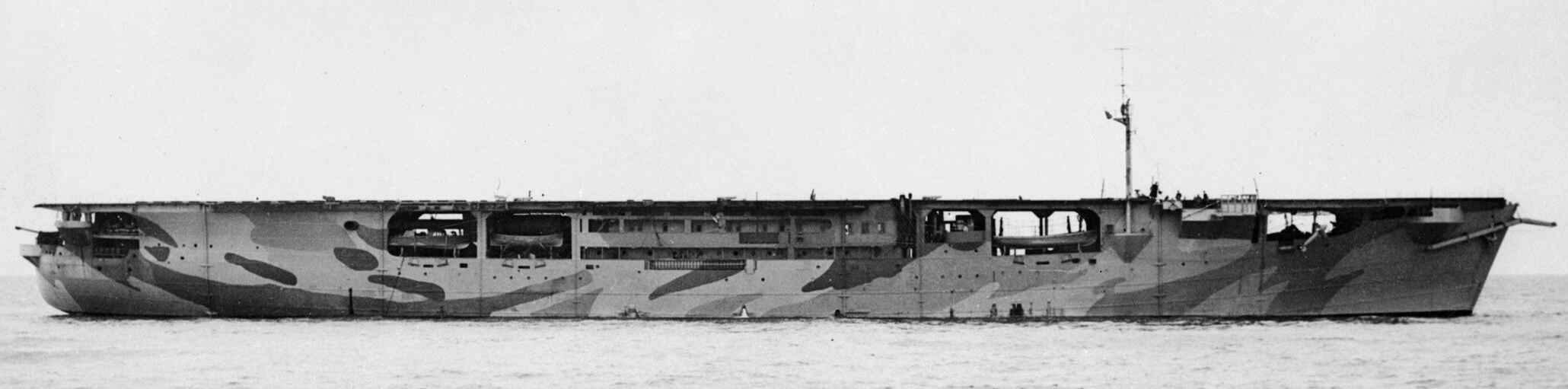
HMS Audacity, ex-Empire Audacity

Empire Audacity was a 5,537 GRT cargo ship built in 1939 by Bremer Vulkan, Bremen. Originally named Hannover and owned by North German Lloyd Line. Captured on 7 March 1940 by Royal Navy off Dominica. To MoWT, renamed Sinbad, then Empire Audacity, managed by Cunard White Star Line. Converted to an escort aircraft carrier in 1941, to Royal Navy as HMS Audacity. Torpedoed and sunk on 23 December 1941 by U-751 at 43°45′N 19°54′W.

== Empire Audrey ==
Empire Audrey was a 657 GRT coastal tanker built in 1943 by G Brown & Co Ltd, Greenock. Launched on 23 February 1942 and completed in June 1943. Sold in 1946 to F T Everard & Sons Ltd., London, and renamed Audacity. Grounded on 11 January 1967 near the Terschelling Bank Light Vessel, Netherlands (52°21′N 05°06′E). Her bottom was damaged and she was flooded. Refloated on 21 January and towed to Harlingen where temporary repairs were carried out. Towed to Greenhithe, Kent 25 January. Sold for scrap at a later date. Scrapped in August 1969 at Boom, Belgium.

== Empire Austen ==
Empire Austen was a 7,057 GRT cargo ship built in 1942 by Lithgows Ltd, Port Glasgow. Managed by Honeyman & Co until 1946 when management passed to Counties Ship Management (CSM). She was sold to CSM in 1949 and renamed Frinton. Sold to Crest Shipping Co., Nassau in 1951 and renamed Freecrest. Sold in 1955 to International Navigation Corporation, Liberia and renamed Fairwater. Sold in 1961 to Surrendra Private Ltd., Calcutta and renamed APJ Usha. Scrapped in India 1961.

== Empire Avocet ==
Empire Avocet was a 5,963 GRT refrigerated cargo ship built in 1919 by the Moore Shipbuilding Co., Oakland. Originally owned by United States Shipping Board and named Cotati. To United States Maritime Commission in 1937 and MoWT in 1942, managed by New Zealand Shipping Co. Torpedoed and sunk on 29 September 1942 by U 125 at 04°05′N 13°23′W.

== Empire Ayr ==
Empire Ayr was a 5,064 GRT cargo ship built in 1943 by Öresundsvarvet, Landskrona. Originally owned by J T Essberger, Hamburg and named Eberhart Essberger. Seized at Kiel in 1945, to MoWT, renamed Empire Ayr. Sold to USSR 1946 and renamed Dmitry Donskoy. Scrapped in USSR 1974.

== See also ==
The above entries give a precis of each ship's history. For a fuller account see the linked articles.

== Sources ==
- Mitchell, W H; Sawyer, L A (1990). The Empire Ships (Second ed.). London, New York, Hamburg, Hong Kong: Lloyd's of London Press Ltd. ISBN 1-85044-275-4.
