= MV Tuscan Star =

A number of motor vessels have been named Tuscan Star, including:

- MV Tuscan Star (1930), a British cargo ship in service 1930–42
- MV Tuscan Star (1945), a British cargo ship in service 1947–48
