= SS Tung An =

A number of ships have been named Tung An, including:

- SS Tung An (1903), a Chinese cargo ship in service 1946–49
- SS Tung An (1943), a Hong Kong registered cargo ship in service 1963–66
