= SS Alcyone Fortune =

A number of steamships were named Alcyone Fortune, including –

- SS Alcyone Fortune (1942), in service 1948–51
- SS Alcyone Fortune (1943), in service 1952–53
- SS Alcyone Fortune (1945), in service 1956–58
