= SS Marina =

SS Marina may refer to a number of ships.

- SS Marina (1900), a Donaldson Line steamship torpedoed in 1916 by U-55.
- SS Marina (1935), a Kaye, Son & Co Ltd steamship torpedoed in 1940 by U-48 in Convoy OB 213. Two of Marina's crew were killed in the explosion.
- SS Marina (1941), C-1-A cargo ship, USMC then A. H. Hull & Co.
- SS Marina (1945), built as SS Empire Antigua. Carried the name Marina shortly before scrapping in 1968.
