= Pacuare =

Pacuare may refer to:

- The Pacuare River, in Costa Rica
- MV Pacuare, a refrigerated ship in service with Fyffes Line from 1946-59
