= Fairwater =

Fairwater may refer to:

- Fairwater, Cardiff, Wales
  - Fairwater (Cardiff electoral ward)
  - Fairwater railway station
- Fairwater, Double Bay, a heritage-listed house in Double Bay, Sydney, Australia
- Fairwater, Torfaen, Wales
- Fairwater, Wisconsin, U.S.A.
- SS Fairwater, a ship
- Sail (submarine), a vertical extension on most submarines that houses the periscopes, masts, and in some cases the conning tower
