= MV Timaru Star =

MV Timaru Star may refer to:

- MV Timaru Star (1945)
- MV Timaru Star (1967)
- MV Timaru Star (2004)
