= HMS Farnham Castle =

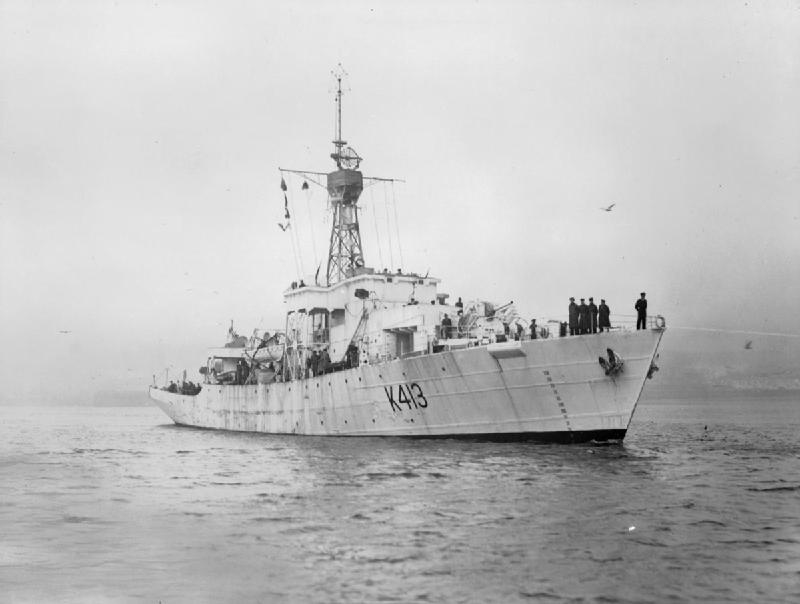
- Oblique front view of Farnham Castle, 1945

History

United Kingdom
- Name: Farnham Castle
- Namesake: Farnham Castle
- Builder: John Crown & Sons Ltd
- Laid down: 25 June 1943
- Launched: 25 April 1944
- Commissioned: 31 January 1945
- Out of service: 24 May 1945
- Identification: Pennant number: K413
- Fate: Scrapped, 31 October 1960

General characteristics (as built)
- Class & type: Castle-class corvette
- Displacement: 1,010 long tons (1,030 t) (standard)
- Length: 252 ft (76.8 m)
- Beam: 33 ft (10.1 m)
- Draught: 13 ft 9 in (4.2 m) (deep load)
- Installed power: 2 Admiralty 3-drum boilers; 2,880 ihp (2,150 kW)
- Propulsion: 1 shaft, 1 triple-expansion engine
- Speed: 16.5 knots (30.6 km/h; 19.0 mph)
- Range: 6,500 nmi (12,000 km; 7,500 mi) at 15 knots (28 km/h; 17 mph)
- Complement: 99
- Sensors & processing systems: Type 145 and Type 147 ASDIC; Type 272 search radar; HF/DF radio direction finder
- Armament: 1 × QF 4 in (102 mm) DP gun; 2 × twin, 2 × single 20 mm (0.8 in) AA guns; 1 × 3-barrel Squid anti-submarine mortar; 1 × depth charge rail and 2 throwers; 15 depth charges

HMS Farnham Castle (K413) was a Castle-class corvette built for the Royal Navy during the Second World War. Completed in 1945, she spent the rest of the war escorting Arctic convoys to the Soviet Union. The ship was reduced to reserve on 24 May and scrapped in 1960.

== Design and description ==
The Castle-class corvette was a stretched version of the preceding Flower class, enlarged to improve seakeeping and to accommodate modern weapons. The ships displaced 1,010 long tons (1,030 t) at standard load and 1,510 long tons (1,530 t) at deep load. The ships had an overall length of 252 feet (76.8 m), a beam of 36 feet 9 inches (11.2 m) and a deep draught of 13 feet 9 inches (4.2 m). They were powered by a four-cylinder triple-expansion steam engine driving one propeller shaft using steam provided by two Admiralty three-drum boilers. The engine developed a total of 2,880 indicated horsepower (2,150 kW) and gave a speed of 16.5 knots (30.6 km/h; 19.0 mph). The Castles carried enough fuel oil to give them a range of 6,500 nautical miles (12,000 km; 7,500 mi) at 15 knots (28 km/h; 17 mph). The ships' complement was 99 officers and ratings.

The Castle-class ships were equipped with a single QF 4-inch (102 mm) Mk XVI dual-purpose gun forward, but their primary weapon was their single three-barrel Squid anti-submarine mortar. This was backed up by one depth charge rail and two throwers for 15 depth charges. The ships were fitted with two twin and a pair of single mounts for 20-millimeter (0.8 in) Oerlikon AA guns. Provision was made for a further four single mounts if needed. They were equipped with Type 145Q and Type 147B ASDIC sets to detect submarines by reflections from sound waves beamed into the water. A Type 272 search radar and a HF/DF radio direction finder rounded out the Castles' sensor suite.

== Construction and career ==
Farnham Castle was laid down at John Crown & Sons in Sunderland on 25 June 1943 and launched on 25 April 1944 before being commissioned on 31 January 1945. After working up, she joined Convoy JW 65 on 12 March. The ship formed part of the close escort of the return convoy, RA 65 on 23 March. Farnham Castle was assigned to the close escort of Convoy JW 66 on 16 April and then RA 66 on 29 April. She arrived at the Clyde on the day that Germany surrendered, 8 May. The ship was reduced to reserve on 24 May. Farnham Castle arrived at Gateshead on 31 October 1960 to be broken up.

== Publications ==
- Campbell, N. J. M. (1980). "Great Britain (including Empire Forces)". In Chesneau, Roger (ed.). Conway's All the World's Fighting Ships 1922–1946. Conway Maritime Press. pp. 2–85. ISBN 0-85177-146-7.
- Colledge, J. J.; Warlow, Ben & Bush, Steve (2020). Ships of the Royal Navy: The Complete Record of all Fighting Ships of the Royal Navy from the 15th Century to the Present (5th revised and updated ed.). Seaforth Publishing. ISBN 978-1-5267-9327-0.
- Goodwin, Norman; compiled by (2007). Castle Class Corvettes: An Account of the Service of the Ships and of Their Ships' Companies. Maritime Books. ISBN 978-1-904459-27-9.
- Lenton, H. T. (1998). British & Empire Warships of the Second World War. Naval Institute Press. ISBN 1-55750-048-7.
