= HMS Hollyhock (K64) =

Flower-class corvette

Coordinates: 07°21′N 81°57′E

History

United Kingdom
- Name: HMS Hollyhock
- Builder: John Crown & Sons Ltd
- Laid down: 27 November 1939
- Launched: 19 August 1940
- Commissioned: 19 November 1940
- Identification: Pennant number: K64
- Fate: Sunk 9 April 1942

General characteristics
- Class & type: Flower-class corvette

HMS Hollyhock was a Flower-class corvette that served in the Royal Navy. During her career, she was frequently used for escorting convoys. She was captained by Lt. Thomas Edward Davies.

== Career ==
Hollyhock was ordered from John Crown & Sons Ltd on 31 August 1939, laid down on 27 November 1939, and launched on 19 August 1940. She was commissioned into the Royal Navy on 19 November 1940.

Hollyhock's career began with conducting and participating in exercises from 4 December 1940 to 7 December 1940. Early in March 1941, she escorted the convoy SC 23 and was damaged by strong weather, but was repaired shortly afterwards.

On 19 April 1941, she escorted the convoy HX 119, which had departed from Halifax 13 days earlier on 6 April 1941. She aided convoy OB 318 on 10 May 1941, and towed the Aelybryn to Reykjavik after it had been damaged by torpedoes. Hollyhock then escorted convoy HX 124 on 11 May 1941.

Between 8 June and 8 July 1941, Hollyhock escorted OB 331, OB 340, SC 33 and HX 134. On 8 July 1941, she sailed to Glasgow to be fitted with new equipment. She was fitted with a refrigerator and air cooling so as to be better suited for a tropical environment, and was also fitted with a 271 RDF Radar and minesweeping gear. After she had been fitted with the new equipment on 9 October, she soon departed from Liverpool for Freetown on 13 October, escorting convoy OS 9. Upon arriving in Freetown on 9 November, she would be a part of training exercises, along with HMS Severn, Brilliant, Bridgewater and Turcoman.

On 28 November 1941, she left Freetown, escorting the convoy WS 12Z on its voyage to Durban. The convoy arrived 18 December, and she would spend the next month escorting other convoys in the area. During this time, she was repaired and had her boilers cleaned while in Simonstown on 15 December. It was also during this time that Japan entered the war (7 December 1941).

On 28 February 1942, convoy SU 1 departed from Colombo and was escorted by the Hollyhock part of the way, before parting ways. HMS Hollyhock and Express returned to Colombo, arriving on 3 March 1942, and the rest of Convoy SU 1 arrived in Freemantle on 15 March 1942. Afterwards, Hollyhock escorted HMS Ranchi from 7-11 March, Convoy C 7 on the 13th to 20th and then finally HMS Holxa, an isles-class trawler.

At the very end of March the Hollyhock was nominated to carry out the task of escorting ships that were laying mines. At the start of April, she began this duty. It was also around this time that the Japanese navy increased aggression, starting with the bombing of an allied air base in Colombo on 5 April 1942. Many aircraft were destroyed, along with the armed merchant cruiser HMS Hector and destroyer HMS Tenedos. On 8 April, the Japanese First Carrier Fleet, consisting of five aircraft carriers, four battlecruisers, two heavy cruisers, and nine destroyers, were spotted advancing for an attack on Trincomalee, where Hollyhock was currently situated. She, along with a few others were given the orders to depart from Trincomalee and sail southwards, and to be 40 miles from Trincomalee by the dawn of 9 April.

On 9 April 1942, Hollyhock was escorting the SS Athelstane as they and a few others fled southwards from Trincomalee. Japanese reconnaissance aircraft from the Haruna soon sighted the convoy, and shortly thereafter, 85 Japanese dive bombers and 3 Japanese fighter aircraft were deployed from the Japanese First Carrier Fleet. At around 12 o'clock, Hollyhock was bombed by Japanese naval aircraft launched from the carrier Sōryū in the Indian Ocean, 30 miles SSE of Batticaloa, Ceylon (7.30N 81.56E). Nine total aircraft attacked Hollyhock and Athelstane, and Hollyhock was soon sunk after being bombed. It was reported that she sunk in five minutes, due to multiple bombs going down her funnels. Her captain, two officers, and fifty ratings on board lost their lives. After Hollyhock had been sunk, the Japanese aircraft targeted the Athelstane and she was soon sunk as well, but all crew aboard survived, and even helped some of the crew from Hollyhock. Some of the survivors from Hollyhock and Athelstane were able to make it to the coast of Ceylon alive. During the same engagement, the aircraft carrier Hermes and the Australian destroyer Vampire that were part of the convoy going south from Trincomalee were also sunk.
