= National Waterfront Museum =

Museum in Swansea, Wales

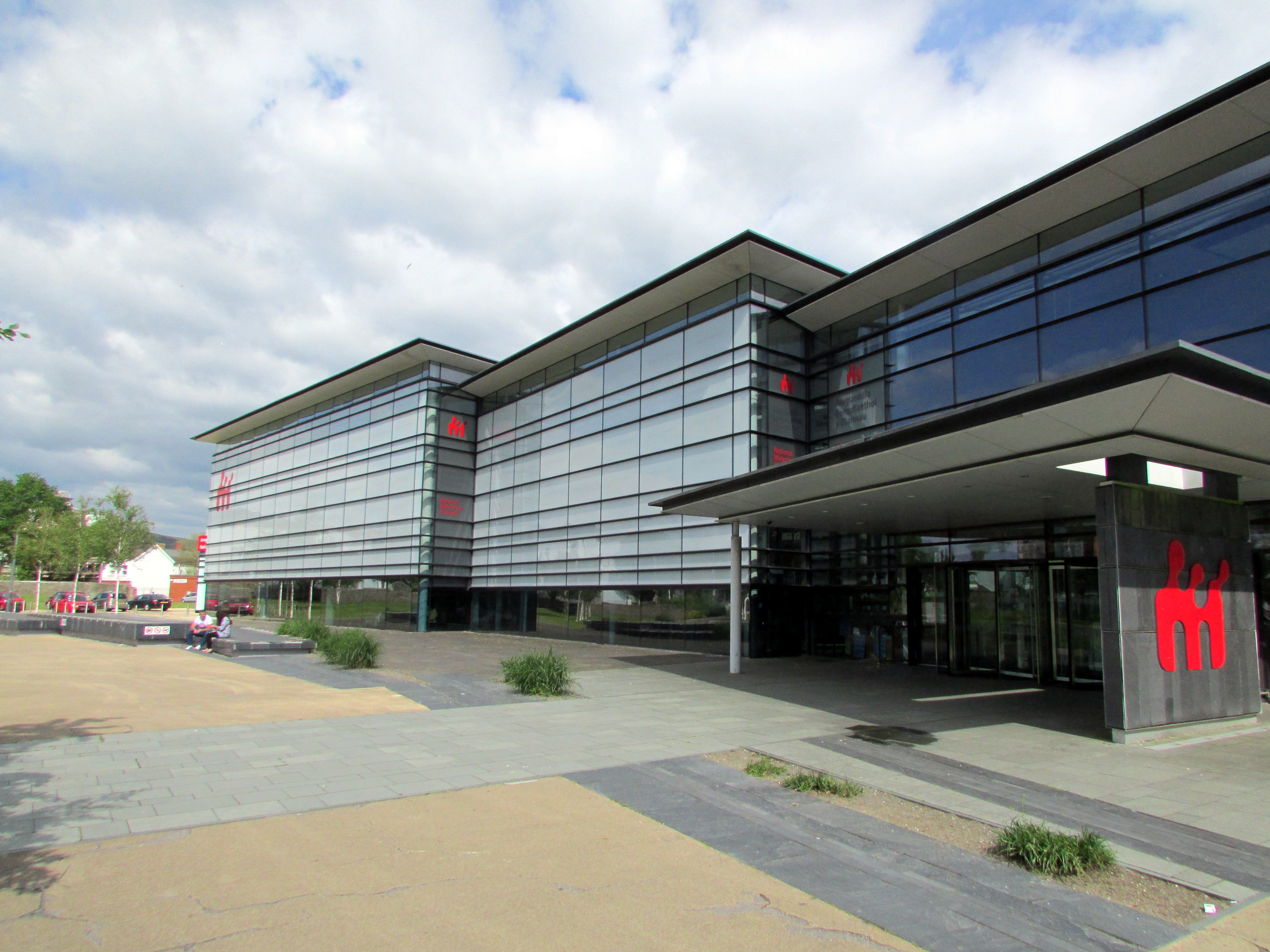
- National Waterfront Museum

- Museum location in Swansea, Wales
- Location: Swansea, Wales
- Coordinates: 51.616843°N 3.938820°W
- Type: Maritime museum, Industry
- Website: museum.wales/swansea/

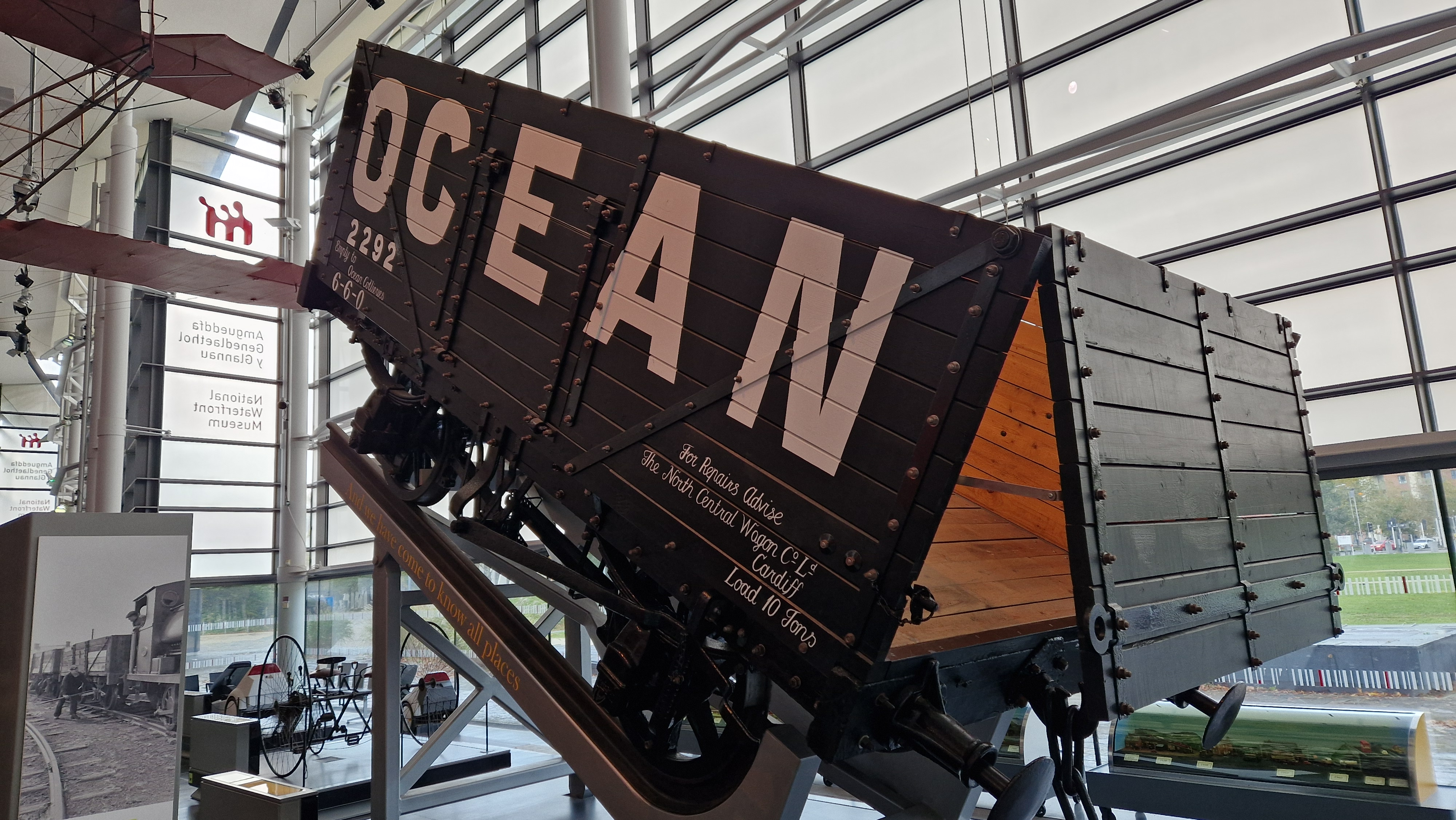
Mineral wagon at the National Waterfront Museum

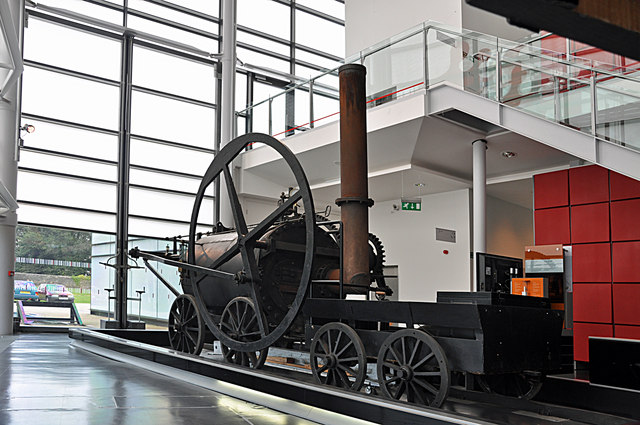
Replica of Richard Trevithick's steam locomotive, Pen-y-Darren

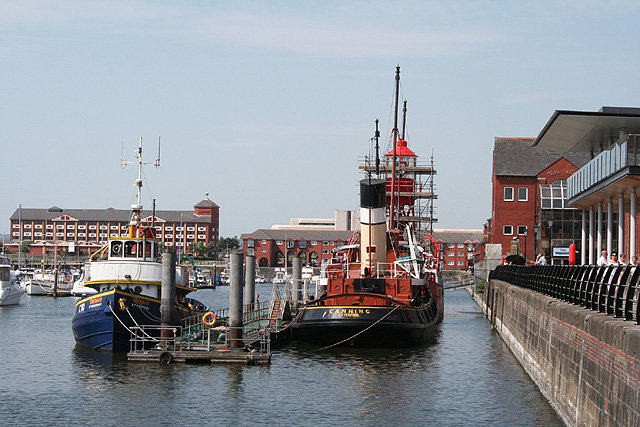
National Waterfront Museum and marina

The National Waterfront Museum, Swansea or NWMS (Welsh: Amgueddfa Genedlaethol y Glannau) is a museum in Swansea, Wales, forming part of Amgueddfa Cymru – Museum Wales. It is an Anchor Point of ERIH, The European Route of Industrial Heritage.

== Construction and development ==
Building and exhibition design was carried out by Wilkinson Eyre and Land Design Studio respectively, following an Architectural Design Competition managed by RIBA Competitions. The £33.5 million museum, which secured funding from the Welsh Development Agency and £11 million from the Heritage Lottery Fund was opened in October 2005.

== Description and contents ==
Consisting of a major new slate and glass building integrated with an existing Grade II listed warehouse (formerly the Swansea Industrial and Maritime Museum), the new museum deals with Wales' history of Industrial Revolution and innovation by combining significant historical artifacts with modern technologies, such as interactive touchscreens and multimedia presentation systems.

Concerns have been raised about the lack of accessibility for the new museum, although it is one of the first museums in the United Kingdom to feature multilingual voiceovers, as well as British Sign Language captioning on all interactive content.

== See also ==
- Welsh Industrial and Maritime Museum (1977 to 1998)
