= SS Cockaponset =

Steam cargo ship

History

United States
- Name: Cockaponset
- Owner: USSB (1919–1936); MARCOM (1936–1941); MoWT (1941)
- Operator: Williams, Dimond & Co. (1919–1920); Lykes Brothers (1922–1924); Daniel Ripley & Co. (1924–1930); Lamport & Holt (1941)
- Ordered: 16 November 1917
- Builder: Pacific Coast Shipbuilding Company, Bay Point
- Yard number: 3
- Laid down: 15 June 1918
- Launched: 4 May 1919
- Sponsored by: Mrs. John T. Scott
- Commissioned: 11 November 1919
- Maiden voyage: 28 December 1919
- Home port: San Francisco
- Identification: US Official Number 219030; Code letters LTFG (1919–1933); Call sign KJGC (1934–1941)
- Fate: Sunk, 20 May 1941

General characteristics
- Type: Design 1015 cargo ship
- Tonnage: 5,995 GRT; 4,443 NRT; 9,627 DWT
- Length: 402.5 ft (122.7 m)
- Beam: 53.0 ft (16.2 m)
- Draft: 26 ft 6 in (8.08 m) (loaded)
- Depth: 32.0 ft (9.8 m)
- Installed power: 2,800 shp
- Propulsion: Kerr Turbine Co. steam turbine, double reduction geared to one screw
- Speed: 11 knots (13 mph; 20 km/h)

Cockaponset was a steam cargo ship built in 1918–1919 by Pacific Coast Shipbuilding Company of Bay Point for the United States Shipping Board as part of the wartime shipbuilding program of the Emergency Fleet Corporation (EFC) to restore the nation's Merchant Marine. The vessel was largely employed on the Gulf Coast of the United States to Europe route until 1930 when she was laid up. In late 1940 the ship together with 15 other vessels was acquired by the British government to alleviate significant shortage of tonnage due to an ongoing German U-boat campaign. In May 1941 the freighter was torpedoed and sunk on her first war trip to the United Kingdom.

== Design and construction ==
After the United States entry into World War I, a large shipbuilding program was undertaken to restore and enhance shipping capabilities both of the United States and their Allies. As part of this program, EFC placed orders with nation's shipyards for a large number of vessels of standard designs. Design 1015 cargo ship was a standard cargo freighter of approximately 9,400 tons deadweight designed by Moore Shipbuilding Co. and adopted by USSB.

Cockaponset was part of the order for 10 vessels placed by USSB with Pacific Coast Shipbuilding Co. on 16 November 1917 and was laid down at shipbuilder's yard on 15 June 1918 and launched on 4 May 1919 (yard number 3), with Mrs. John T. Scott, wife of vice-president of the Pacific Coast Shipbuilding Co., being the sponsor. Just as with many other vessels being built for the Shipping Board, her name was picked by Mrs. Woodrow Wilson who often chose Native American words for naming purposes.

The ship was shelter-deck type, had two main decks and was built on the Isherwood principle of longitudinal framing providing extra strength to the body of the vessel. The freighter had four main holds and also possessed all the modern machinery for quick loading and unloading of cargo from five large hatches, including ten winches and a large number of derricks. She was also equipped with wireless apparatus, had submarine signal system installed and had electrical lights installed along the decks.

As built, the ship was 402.5 feet (122.7 m) long (between perpendiculars) and 53.0 feet (16.2 m) abeam, a depth of 32.0 feet (9.8 m). Cockaponset was originally assessed at 5,995 GRT and 4,443 NRT and had deadweight of approximately 9,627. The vessel had a steel hull with double bottom throughout with exception of her machine compartment, and a single turbine rated at 2,800 shp, double-reduction geared to a single screw propeller that moved the ship at up to 11 knots (13 mph; 20 km/h). The steam for the engine was supplied by three single-ended Scotch marine boilers fitted for both coal and oil fuel.

The sea trials were held in the San Francisco Bay on 26 and 27 December 1919 with the ship performing satisfactorily. Following their successful completion, the ship departed on her maiden voyage to Rotterdam.

== Operational history ==
While the steamer was still under construction she was allocated by the USSB on 15 August 1919 to Williams, Dimond & Co. to serve on the West Coast to Europe routes. Upon delivery to the USSB the ship loaded 8,200 tons of general cargo consisting mostly of canned and dried fruit, brandy and wine and was initially supposed to depart for France and Belgium at the end of November. In the early morning of December 9 a fire was discovered in No.2 hold and a fire-fighting system was employed. However, the flames fueled by the casks of brandy stored in the hold soon spread to hold No.3 and a fireboat was dispatched to assist in fighting the fire. The flames were finally extinguished by noon and the cargo had to be discharged to assess the damage. The cause of the fire was never established but was believed to be caused by a lit cigarette thrown in the holds by one of the stevedores. After being further delayed by foggy weather, Cockaponset finally sailed out for her maiden voyage on 28 December 1919 bound for Le Havre, Rotterdam and Antwerp. Upon reaching her destinations and unloading of her cargo, the freighter left Antwerp on 24 March 1920 bound for the West Coast where she was to take cargo of grain and flour. On her way back she first called at Pensacola and Mobile to discharge part cargo of potash and to load general cargo and iron pipes and continued on to San Francisco. On May 28 she received a distress call from another USSB steamer, SS City of Omaha, who laid disabled about 120 miles off Cabo San Lucas with boiler problems. Cockaponset took the disabled vessel in tow and brought her into San Pedro on June 4. Cockaponset sailed out from San Pedro on June 10 on the last leg of her journey and arrived at San Francisco a few hours later finalizing nearly 30,000-mile long maiden journey. For her next trip Cockaponset departed San Francisco on June 28 laden with 7,400 tons of flour bound for Alexandria. She returned from her trip back to New York on October 11 and remained berthed in port before being laid up at the end of 1920 and relocated to Prall's Island in January 1921.

On 12 August 1922 it was reported that the Shipping Board had decided to reactivate many vessels due to ongoing coal emergency to bring coal from Great Britain. Three vessels were allocated to Gulf operators, with Cockaponset being assigned to Lykes Brothers. At the time of allocation the freighter was berthed at New Orleans where she was sent for reconditioning from New York at the end of July 1922. The freighter eventually departed New Orleans on September 13 with general cargo bound for England and arrived at London on October 5, then proceeding to Hull reaching it on October 16. Upon return she loaded 2,471 tons of phosphate pebble at Tampa, continued on to New Orleans to embark general cargo and left for United Kingdom in early January 1923. She made one more trip to England in April 1923 with 2,675 tons of phosphate rock from Tampa and general cargo from Mobile and New Orleans. On that trip she started experiencing engine problems and arrived at Gravesend with her machinery defective on 26 May 1923 and had to be towed into port to unload cargo and undergo repairs. She continued to experience problems with pumps and engine but managed to departed for New Orleans on July 16. On August 20 when she was off Great Isaac's Key in the Bahamas she became disabled due to water in her fuel oil. She was taken into tow on August 22 by another steamer, SS Radnor, and brought into Key West for repairs. After refueling, cleaning boilers and other miscellaneous repairs, the freighter departed Key West on August 30 and arrived at New Orleans a week later. She was scheduled for another trip to England, but it never materialized and the ship remained idle berthed in New Orleans for almost a year.

On 8 August 1924 it was reported that the Shipping Board had allocated Cockaponset to Daniel Ripley & Co., a subsidiary of Lykes Brothers acquired by them in 1923, to serve on their Galveston to French Atlantic ports as part of their Texas Star Line. The ship arrived at Galveston on August 21 to load 136,000 bushels of wheat in addition to 10,364 bales of cotton and cleared from port on August 30 bound for Ghent, Antwerp and Le Havre. Cockaponset remained a part of Texas Star Line through the early part of 1927 carrying wheat and cotton to ports in Low Countries and occasionally to Bremen.

In early March 1927 Cockaponset while on her return trip to United States became disabled about 480 miles east southeast of Galveston due to engine problems. Another Shipping Board vessel, SS West Cobalt, sped up to her aid, took the disabled freighter in tow and safely brought her into Galveston on March 10. After unloading and quick repairs, the ship sailed for Mobile but again became disabled due to a loss of turbine shaft on March 28 and had to be towed in. The vessel was subsequently laid up in Mobile for the remainder of 1927 and most of 1928.

At the end of November 1928 it was reported that Cockaponset was again allocated to Daniel Ripley & Co. and was brought in to Galveston from Mobile to undergo extensive repairs. The vessel continued sailing largely on the same routes carrying the same cargo. For example, on 27 August 1929 she cleared from Galveston for the Low Countries carrying 184,000 bushels of wheat in addition to other cargo. The freighter continued sailing on her trade routes through the first half of 1930, but was eventually laid up.

=== Sinking ===
On 14 November 1940 the U.S. Government through the Maritime Commission offered fifteen old World War I era laid up vessels in their possession for sale to the British firms. The ships were offered on "as is, where is" basis, and the ownership had to be transferred within six months of purchase. On 13 December 1940 the bidding process for 16 vessels was opened, and the next day a variety of British shipping operators through their New York agent made a joint bid for all the vessels in the amount of US$3,010,800 and additionally placed individual bids for each ship offered for purchase. Cockaponset was among the vessels and the bid offered for her was US$216,000. On 18 December 1940 the Maritime Commission announced that all sixteen vessels were sold to British interests for a total amount of US$3,295,800. The freighter was then taken over by the UK's Ministry of War Transport with Lamport & Holt being retained as operators. She was also transferred into British registry per requirements established by the Maritime Commission.

Following the sale, Cockaponset who was laid up in New Orleans, was brought into Galveston to undergo repairs and reconditioning. Upon the completion of the work, she sailed for Houston on 1 April 1941. From there she proceeded to Halifax where she loaded a cargo consisting of 2,700 tons of steel, 1,924 tons of carbon black, 250 tons of TNT, 223 tons of trucks in crates and 1,162 tons of general cargo. The freighter was under command of captain Benjamin Green and had a crew of forty one including the captain and two gunners armed with Lewis machine guns. Initially, Cockaponset was set to be part of convoy HX 123 which left Halifax on April 23, but she was instead moved on to next convoy, HX 124. The freighter, however, did not sail with that convoy either, and finally was able to depart with convoy HX 125 leaving Halifax on 6 May 1941. Upon departure, the vessel developed problems with her engines, and had to return into port for repairs.

She finally sailed with Convoy HX 126 in the early afternoon on May 10 bound for Liverpool escorted only by the British armed merchant cruiser Aurania. The journey was uneventful until the night of May 19. The ships in convoy were proceeding at a speed of about 8 to 9 knots (9.2 to 10.4 mph; 15 to 17 km/h), the weather was fine with great visibility. In the early morning of May 20 one of the last ships in the convoy column, SS Norman Monarch, was torpedoed which led to the whole convoy starting evasive maneuvers and laying smoke to conceal the vessels. At around 12:50 German submarine U-556 fired three torpedoes in quick succession at two large tankers, hitting them both within two minutes of each other and setting them on fire. Cockaponset resumed evasive maneuvers also trying to stay clear of burning oil. Meanwhile, U-556 loaded her last torpedo and fired it at around 13:06 at a large freighter right in front of her. Cockaponset was struck on her starboard side near No. 4 hatch a few minutes later. The vessel immediately started taking on water and began listing, prompting the engineers to stop the engines. Two lifeboats were launched and the entire crew disembarked the freighter in orderly fashion. Cockaponset sank stern first at approximately 13:35 in approximate position 57°24′N 40°56′W. The crew was picked up by Dutch rescue ship Hontestroom in the morning of May 21 and taken to Reykjavík where they were landed on May 27.
