= Empire Activity =

Empire Activity was the name of a number of ships.

- SS Empire Activity, a cargo ship built in 1919 as SS Belgian and later in service as the Amelia Lauro, Seized at Immingham during World War Two and renamed Empire Activity, wrecked off Newfoundland in 1943
- MV Empire Activity, a refrigerated cargo ship laid down in 1940 as MV Telemachus, requisitioned as Empire Activity and converted to an escort carrier as HMS Activity, converted to merchant vessel MV Breconshire in 1947 and scrapped in 1967
