= Welsh Industrial and Maritime Museum =

Former museum in Cardiff, Wales

- Amgueddfa Diwydiant a Môr Cymru

- Location in central Cardiff
- Established: 1977
- Dissolved: 1 June 1998
- Location: Butetown, Cardiff, Wales
- Coordinates: 51.464°N 3.165°W
- Owner: National Museums and Galleries of Wales
- Public transit access: Cardiff Bute Road railway station Cardiff Bus 8

The Welsh Industrial and Maritime Museum was located in Butetown, Cardiff, Wales, prior to the Cardiff Bay regeneration in the late 1990s. The museum formed part of the National Museums and Galleries of Wales, now known as Amgueddfa Cymru – Museum Wales, and the first stage opened in 1977, and it closed just 22 years later in 1998.

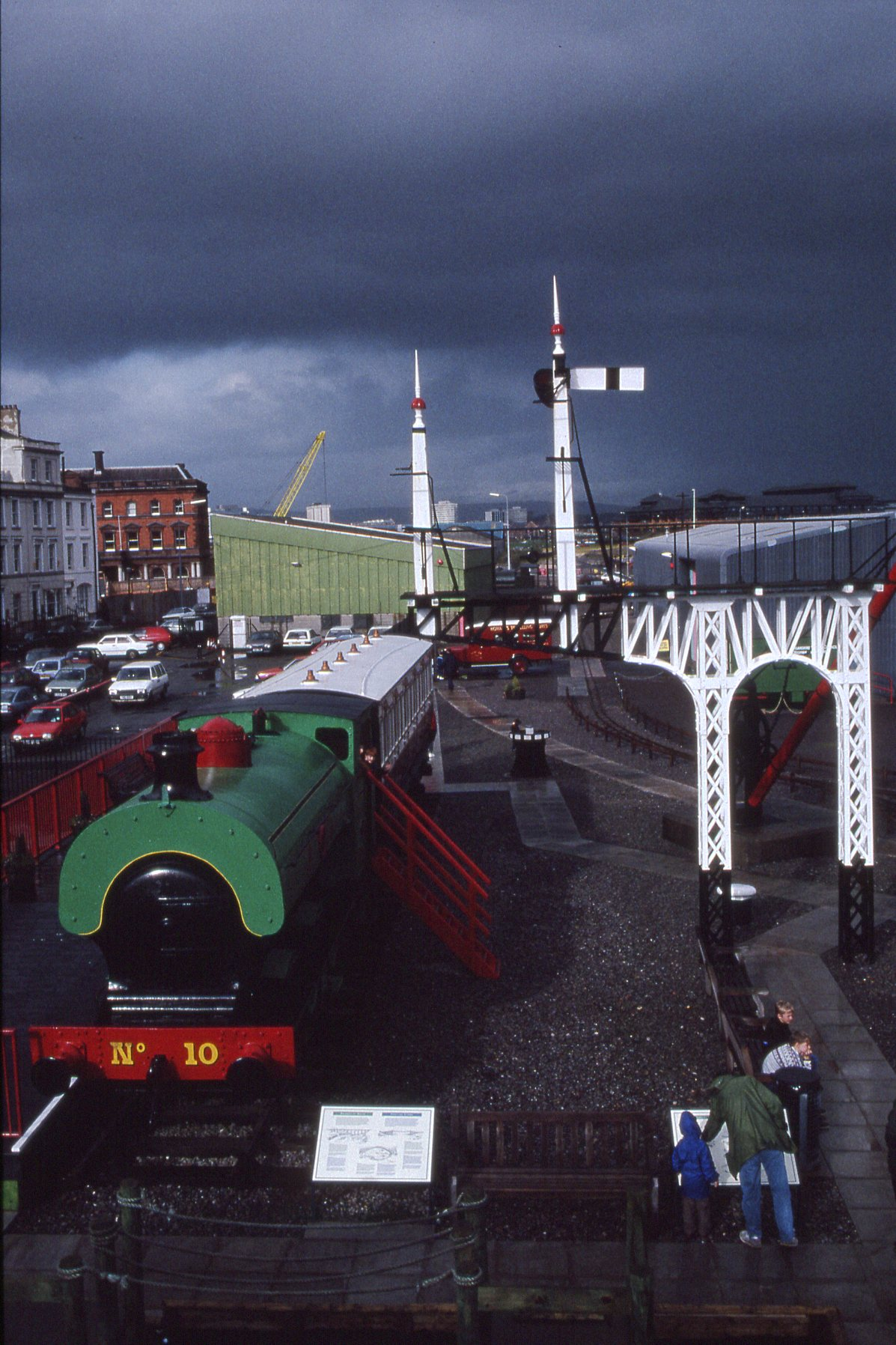
Hudswell Clarke 544 on display at the museum

== History ==
Construction of the museum began in October 1974. Exhibits included cars, a bus and tram, a lighthouse, a figurehead from HMS Hamadryad, the Sea Alarm tugboat and a replica of Richard Trevithick's 1803 locomotive, Pen-y-Darren. A permanent exhibition described the history of the docks and coal mining in South Wales.

Dr Geraint Jenkins was curator of the museum from 1978 until 1987.

The museum closed on 1 June 1998 to make way for the new Mermaid Quay shopping development. Its exhibits were redistributed to other museums and the Sea Alarm was scrapped. A new location for a similar museum, in Swansea, was not chosen until two years after the closure. The National Waterfront Museum opened in Swansea in 2005.
