= USS Surprise (PG-63) =

Temptress-class patrol gunboat (Flower-class corvette in U.S. service)

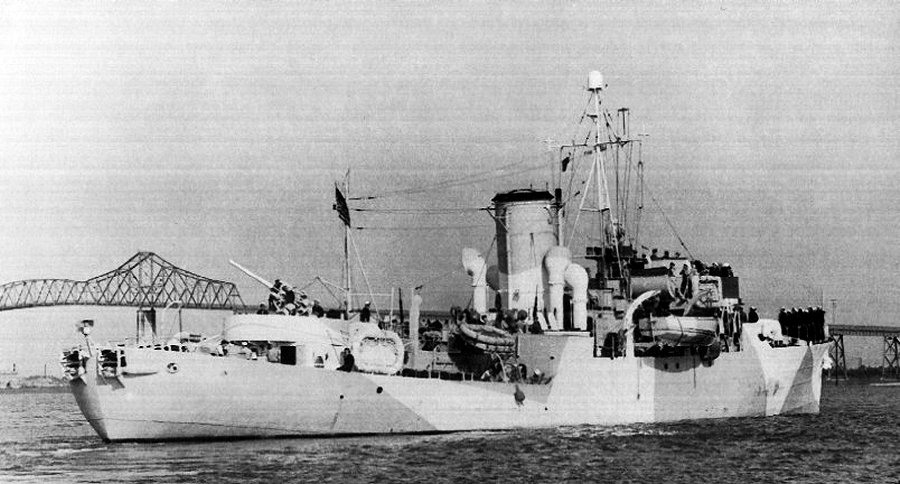
- USS Surprise (PG-63)

History

United Kingdom
- Name: HMS Heliotrope
- Namesake: Heliotrope (flower)
- Builder: John Crown & Sons Ltd, Sunderland
- Laid down: 23 October 1939
- Launched: 5 June 1940
- Commissioned: 12 September 1940
- Decommissioned: 24 March 1942
- Identification: Pennant number: K03
- Fate: Transferred to United States Navy

United States
- Name: Surprise
- Acquired: 24 March 1942
- Commissioned: 24 March 1942
- Decommissioned: 20 August 1945
- Stricken: 17 September 1945
- Identification: Hull number: PG-63
- Fate: Returned to Royal Navy 26 August 1945

United Kingdom
- Name: Heliotrope
- Acquired: 26 August 1945
- Fate: Sold into civilian service, 1947

People's Republic of China
- Name: Linyi
- Namesake: Linyi
- Acquired: 1949
- Commissioned: 1949
- Decommissioned: 1972
- Fate: Scrapped after retirement

General characteristics
- Type: Patrol gunboat
- Displacement: 925 long tons (940 t) (normal); 1,375 long tons (1,397 t) (full load)
- Length: 205 ft 2 in (62.53 m)
- Beam: 33 ft (10 m)
- Draft: 14 ft 7 in (4.45 m)
- Installed power: 2,750 ihp (2,050 kW)
- Propulsion: 1 × vertical triple expansion steam engine; 2 × boilers; 1 × screw
- Speed: 16.5 kn (19.0 mph; 30.6 km/h)
- Complement: 87 officers and enlisted men
- Armament: 1 × 4 in (100 mm) gun; 1 × 3 in (76 mm) gun; 2 × 20 mm (0.79 in) anti-aircraft autocannons; 1 × Hedgehog anti-submarine mortar; 2 × depth charge racks; 4 × depth charge projectors

USS Surprise (PG-63), the fourth American naval ship of the name, was a Temptress-class patrol gunboat during World War II. She was built as the British Flower-class corvette HMS Heliotrope, and was in service with the Royal Navy during the first years of the Battle of the Atlantic. She was loaned to and operated by the United States Navy from 1942 to 1945. After World War II, she was sold as a merchant vessel and ended her life in the Chinese navy as Lin I.

== Design and construction ==
HMS Heliotrope was built by John Crown and Sons Ltd, Sunderland, England, as part of the 1939 building programme. She was laid down on 23 October 1939 and launched on 5 June 1940. The ship was completed and entered service on 12 September 1940, being named for the flower heliotrope, the second ship of that name. As built, Heliotrope had the short forecastle that was a feature of the early Flower-class corvette, and which adversely effected their habitability. This was rectified during a refit, with the enclosed deck extended back to be level with the funnel.

== Service history ==
=== Royal Navy ===
After working up, Heliotrope was assigned to the Western Approaches Escort Force for service as a convoy escort. In this role she was engaged in all the duties performed by escort ships; protecting convoys, searching for and attacking U-boats which attacked ships in convoy, and rescuing survivors.

In 18 months service Heliotrope escorted 18 North Atlantic, eight Gibraltar and four South Atlantic convoys, assisting in the safe passage of over 750 ships.

She was involved in four major convoy battles: In October 1940 Heliotrope was part of the escort for HX 79, which was attacked by a U-boat "wolfpack", losing 12 ships sunk. In May 1941 she joined HX 126 which saw nine ships sunk and one U-boat damaged. In August 1941 she joined SL 81 which saw five ships sunk, while one U-boat was destroyed and two damaged In October 1941 she was with HG 75 which saw four ships and one escort sunk, and one U-boat destroyed.

=== US Navy ===
Heliotrope was transferred to the U.S. Navy at Hull, England, on 24 March 1942, one of a group of corvettes transferred to the U.S. Navy under reverse Lend-Lease. She was commissioned as USS Surprise the same day. She was delivered with British radars and armament installed, and over the course of her U.S. Navy service was gradually converted to U.S. standards. The 4-inch (102 mm) gun was mounted forward, the 3-inch (76 mm) gun aft.

Surprise sailed from Lisahally, County Londonderry, Northern Ireland on 24 April 1942 to escort a convoy to Boston, Massachusetts. After an overhaul, she proceeded south and for the remainder of 1942 escorted convoys in the Caribbean Sea, principally between Trinidad and Guantanamo Bay, Cuba. In January 1943, she extended her range into the South Atlantic and, into 1944, performed escort runs between Trinidad and Recife, Brazil.

Surprise then returned to the United States. In May 1944, she returned to the North Atlantic and, until after the end of World War II in Europe in May 1945, rotated between Newfoundland, Greenland, and Iceland convoy runs and weather patrol duty.

Surprise was decommissioned on 20 August 1945 at Chatham, England, returned to the Royal Navy on 26 August, and struck from the Naval Vessel Register on 17 September.

== Fate ==
She was transferred to China in 1947, and, after a period of mercantile service, she was taken into the People's Liberation Army Navy service as Linyi after converting to a gunboat, and finally retired in 1972.
