= SS Masuren =

History
- Name: Masuren (1935–45); Empire Annan (1945–50); Thomas N Epiphaniades (1950–52); Helga Böge (1952–60); Fuhlsbüttel (1960–64)
- Namesake: Masuria (1935–45); Fuhlsbüttel (1960–64)
- Owner: Kohlen-Import & Poseidon Schiffahrt AG, Königsberg (1935–45); Ministry of War Transport (1945–47); United States Maritime Commission (1947–48); Fanmaur Shipping & Trading Co, New York (1948–50); Thomas N Epiphaniades, Volos (1950–52); Johann M K Blumenthal, Hamburg (1952–59); Köhn & Bohlmann Reederei Hamburg (1959–64)
- Operator: Owner operated except: Crosby, Son & Co Ltd, London (1945–46)
- Port of registry: (Nazi Germany) Königsberg (1935–45); (Nazi Germany) Nordenhamn (1945); (United Kingdom) London (1945–46); (United States) New York (1946–50); (Greece) Volos (1950–52); (West Germany) Hamburg (1952–64)
- Builder: F Schichau GmbH, Danzig
- Yard number: 1349
- Completed: October 1935
- Out of service: 1964
- Identification: UK official number 180633 (1945–46); call sign DADE (1935–45); call sign DHQZ (1945); call sign GLTG (1945–46)
- Fate: Scrapped in Bremerhaven, 1964

General characteristics
- Tonnage: 2,383 GRT, 1,297 NRT
- Length: 281.1 ft (85.7 m)
- Beam: 44.5 ft (13.6 m)
- Draft: 15.0 ft (4.6 m)
- Depth: 18.6 ft (5.7 m)
- Installed power: 358 NHP, 223 hp (166 kW)
- Propulsion: 4-cylinder compound steam engine; plus exhaust steam turbine
- Speed: 12 knots (22 km/h)
- Crew: 27

Masuren was a 2,385 ton cargo ship which was built in 1935. She was seized by Britain in 1945 and renamed Empire Annan. In 1950 she was renamed Thomas N Epiphaniades and then Helga Böge in 1952. In 1959, she was renamed Fuhlsbüttel. She served until 1964 when she was scrapped in Bremerhaven.

== Building ==
F Schichau GmbH built Masuren at its Danzig shipyard as yard number 1349. Her launch date unrecorded but she was completed in October 1935. Schichau made her engines at its works in Elbing. Masuren was powered by a four-cylinder compound steam engine plus low-pressure steam turbine. Together they were rated at 358 NHP and gave her a speed of 12 knots (22 km/h).

== Service history ==
Her first owner was Kohlen-Import & Poseidon Schiffahrt AG and she was registered in Königsberg. Masuren served for ten years until she was seized in Copenhagen by the United Kingdom at the end of the Second World War in 1945. Her port of registry had been changed to Nordenham in that year. Ownership passed to the Ministry of War Transport, who renamed her Empire Annan, and contracted Crosby, Sons & Co to manage her. She was registered in London.

In 1947 Empire Annan passed to the United States Maritime Commission, New York who sold her in 1948 to Fanmaur Shipping & Trading Co, New York in 1948. They sold her in 1950 to Thomas N Epiphaniades, Volos, Greece who renamed her Thomas N Epiphaniades. In 1952 Thomas N Epiphaniades was sold to Johann MK Blumenthal, Hamburg and renamed Helga Böge. She served with them for seven years and was auctioned in 1959 to Koehn & Bohlmann Reederei KG, Hamburg. She was renamed Fuhlsbüttel in 1960, serving for a further four years until 1964 when she was scrapped in Bremerhaven.

== Identification ==
Masuren's call sign was DADE when she was registered in Königsberg and DHQZ when she was registered in Nordenhamn. Empire Annan had the UK official number 180633 and call sign GLTG. Official numbers were a forerunner to IMO numbers.
