= John Crown & Sons =

British shipbuilder 1847-1947

John Crown & Sons Ltd
- Company type: Private
- Industry: Shipbuilding
- Founded: 1847
- Defunct: 1947
- Fate: Acquired
- Successor: J. L. Thompson & Sons
- Headquarters: River Wear, Sunderland

John Crown & Sons Ltd, was a British shipbuilding company founded in 1847 and based on the River Wear, Sunderland.

== History ==
In its centenary year the shipyard was acquired by J.L. Thompson & Sons.

== Ships built by John Crown & Sons Ltd ==
Naval vessels

- River-class frigates
  - HMS Ettrick
- Castle-class corvettes
  - HMS Farnham Castle
  - HMS Hedingham Castle
- Flower-class corvettes
  - HMS Burdock
  - HMS Campion
  - HMS Godetia (ex Dart)
  - HMS Heliotrope
  - HMS Hollyhock
  - HMS Bullrush (mod.Type)
  - HMS Bugloss (mod.Type)
- Isles-class trawlers
  - HMS Earraid
  - HMS Filla
  - HMS Gruinard

Merchant ships

- Tugs
  - Empire Ash
  - Empire Belle
  - Empire Dolly
  - Empire Demon
  - Empire Frank
  - Empire Nicholas
  - Empire Phyllis
  - Empire Sally
  - Empire Wold
- Colliers
  - Empire Highlander
  - Empire Lambeth
  - Empire Lowlander
  - Horseferry
  - Torchbearer
- Cargo ship
  - SS Dagenham

Lightvessels

- Lightvessel
  - Light Vessel 72

== See also ==
- List of shipbuilders and shipyards
