= ST Sea Alarm =

UK tugboat built in 1941

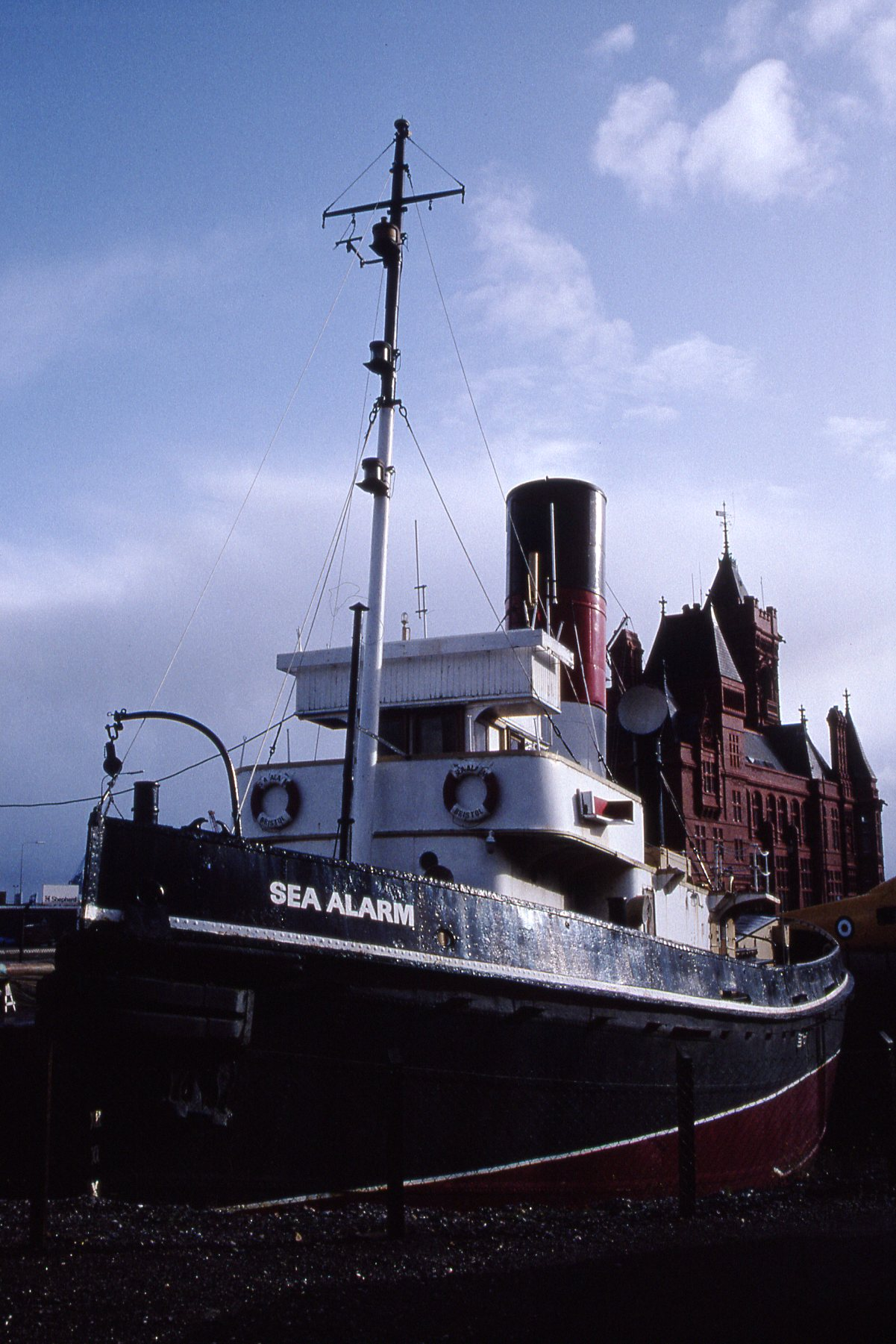
- ST Sea Alarm, formerly Empire Ash.

History
- Name: Empire Ash (1941-46); Flying Fulmar (1946-56); Sea Alarm (1956-98)
- Owner: Ministry of War Transport (1941-46); Clyde Shipping Co Ltd (1946-56); C J King & Sons Ltd, Bristol (1956-73); Welsh Industrial and Maritime Museum, Cardiff (1973-98)
- Port of registry: (United Kingdom) Glasgow (1941-56); (United Kingdom) Bristol (1956-98)
- Builder: John Crown & Sons Ltd, Sunderland
- Yard number: 201
- Launched: 13 August 1941
- Completed: 17 October 1941
- Identification: Official Number 168694; Code Letters BCRK (1941-46); IMO number: 5315943
- Fate: Scrapped 1998

General characteristics
- Tonnage: 263 GRT
- Length: 107 ft 8 in (32.82 m)
- Beam: 26 ft 2 in (7.98 m)
- Draught: 12 ft 5 in (3.78 m)
- Propulsion: 1 x triple expansion steam engine (Swan, Hunter & Wigham Richardson Ltd, Newcastle upon Tyne) 102 hp (76 kW)

ST Sea Alarm was a 263-ton tug which was built as Empire Ash in 1941 for the British Ministry of War Transport (MoWT). She was sold in 1947 and renamed Flying Fulmar. She was sold in 1956 and renamed Sea Alarm. On retirement in 1973 she became an exhibit at the Welsh Industrial and Maritime Museum in Cardiff, but was controversially scrapped in 1998 after the closure of the museum.

== History ==
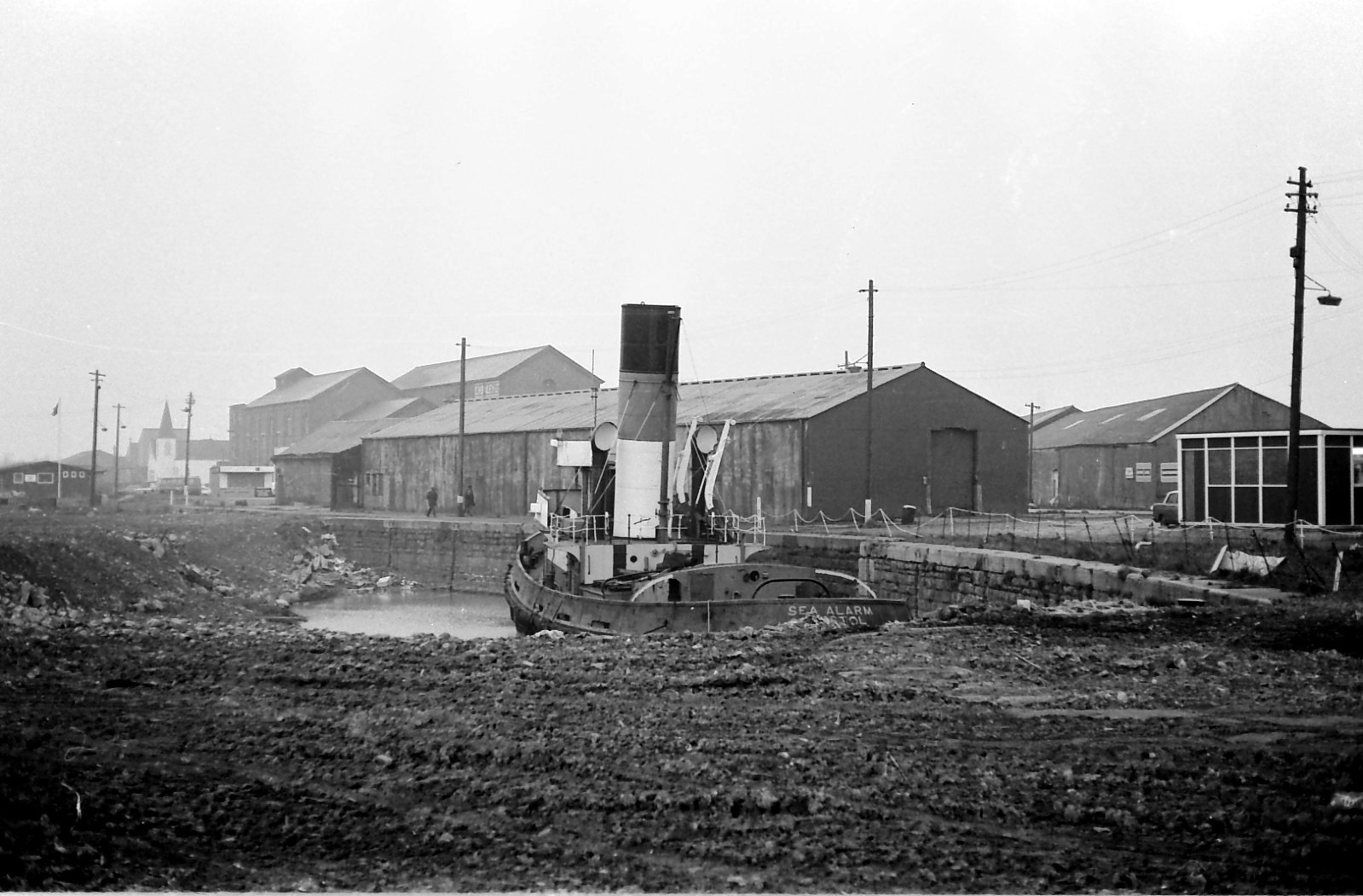
Sea Alarm laid up in Cardiff Docks in 1976, before restoration

Empire Ash was built by John Crown & Sons Ltd, Sunderland as yard number 201. She was launched on 13 August 1941 and completed on 17 October 1941. She was built for the MoWT. On 15 May 1946, Empire Ace was sold for £18,750 to Clyde Shipping Co. Ltd, Glasgow and renamed Flying Fulmar. In May 1956 she was sold to C. J. King & Sons, Bristol, and renamed Sea Alarm. She was operated under the management of the Alarm Steam Tug Co. Ltd. In January 1973 she was sold to Thos. W. Ward, Briton Ferry, for scrapping, but was resold the following month to the Welsh Industrial and Maritime Museum in Cardiff. She was restored by 1978 and was dry-docked for many years at Roath Dock. The museum closed on 1 June 1998 and Sea Alarm was scrapped apart from her engine. Questions were asked by the Select committee on Welsh Affairs about the scrapping of the tug as there was public outcry at the time.

== Official Number and code letters ==
Empire Ash had the UK Official Number 168694 and used the Code Letters BCRK. Official Numbers were a forerunner to IMO Numbers. Sea Alarm was subsequently assigned IMO number 5315943.
