= SS Empire Admiral =

World War II merchant ship of the United Kingdom

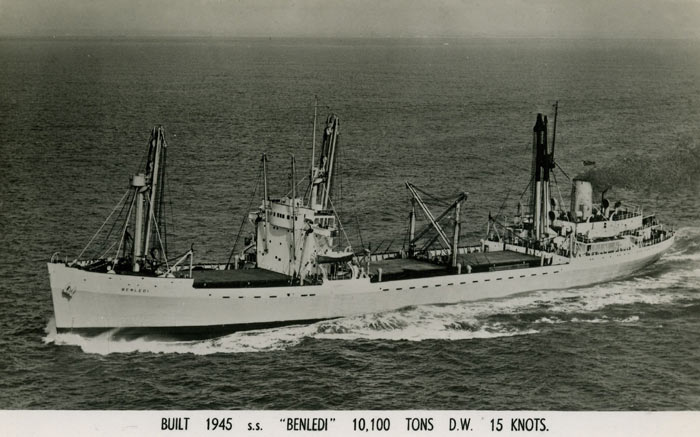
- SS Empire Admiral as SS Benledi

History
- Name: Empire Admiral (1945-47); Peter Dal (1947-51); Benledi (1951-63); Andros Tommeno (1963-66); Unique Carrier (1966-69)
- Owner: Ministry of War Transport (1945-47); Dalhousie Steam and Motorship Co, London (1947-51); W Thompson & Co, Edinburgh (1951-53); E G Thompson Ltd (1953-63); Andros Navigation Co, Nassau (1963); Frank Shipping Co Ltd, Liberia (1963-66); Unique Maritime Corporation, Liberia (1966-69)
- Operator: Alfred Holt & Co (1945); Glen Line (1945-47); Kaye & Co (1947); Dalhousie Steam and Motorship Co (1947-51); Ben Line Steamers (1951-63); Thereafter owner operated
- Port of registry: Barrow in Furness (1945-63); Bahamas (1963); Liberia (1963-69)
- Builder: Vickers-Armstrongs Ltd, Barrow in Furness
- Yard number: 859
- Launched: 26 March 1945
- Completed: August 1945
- Identification: Official Number 169038 (1945-63); Code letters GFJQ (1945-63)
- Fate: Scrapped in Taiwan, 1969

General characteristics
- Tonnage: 7,842 GRT
- Length: 451 ft (137.46 m)
- Beam: 66 ft 7 in (20.29 m)
- Depth: 31 ft (9.45 m)
- Propulsion: 2 x steam turbines driving a single screw through double reduction gearing.
- Speed: 15 knots (28 km/h)

SS Empire Admiral was a 7,842 ton steamship which was built in 1945 for the Ministry of War Transport (MoWT), she was sold in 1947 becoming Peter Dal, and sold again in 1951 and renamed Benledi. In 1953 she was sold to Bahamas and renamed Andros Tommeno, being resold later that year to Liberia. In 1966 she was resold and renamed Unique Carrier, serving until 1969 when she was scrapped in Taiwan.

== History ==
Empire Admiral was built by Vickers-Armstrongs Ltd, Barrow in Furness for the Ministry of War Transport and launched on 26 March 1945, being completed the following August. She was managed by H Hogarth & Sons initially, with management passing to A Weir & Co, London in 1946. In 1947, Empire Admiral was sold to A Weir & Co and renamed Peter Dal. On 21 October 1949, an onboard explosion killed one crew member and injured two others. Peter Dal was only slightly damaged. In 1950, Peter Dal was sold to W Thompson & Co, Edinburgh who traded as Ben Line, and was renamed Benledi. On 24 February 1950, Benledi caught fire in the Mediterranean east of Malta. The 44 crew took to the lifeboats and were rescued by the tanker British Liberty. Benledi was assisted into Malta with the help of HMS Childers, the salvage ship RFA Sea Salvor and the tug HMS Brigand. In 1953, Benledi was sold to E G Thomson Ltd, remaining within the Ben Line fleet.

In 1963, Benledi was sold to Andros Navigation Co., Nassau, Bahamas and renamed Andros Tommeno, being resold later that year to Frank Shipping Co Ltd, Liberia. In 1966, Andros Tommeno was sold to Unique Maritime Corporation, Liberia and renamed Unique Carrier, serving until 1969 when she arrived for scrapping on 27 February 1969 in Kaohsiung, Taiwan.

== Official number and code letters ==
Official Numbers were a forerunner to IMO Numbers.

Empire Admiral had the UK Official Number 169038 and used the Code Letters GFJQ.
