= MV Empire Abercorn =

Ship built in 1944

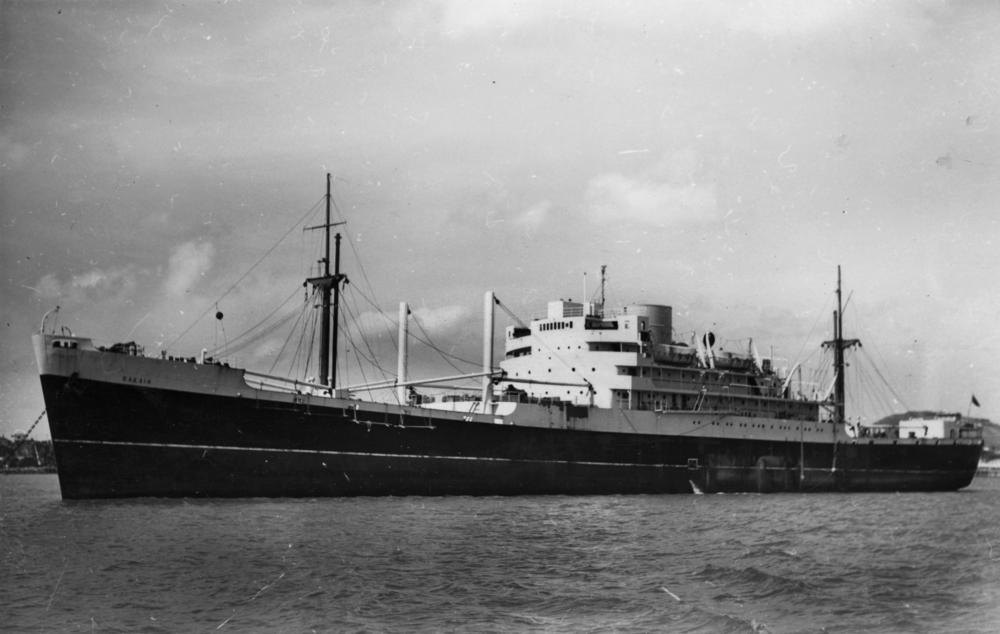
- Rakaia

History

United Kingdom
- Name: Empire Abercorn (1944–46); Rakaia (1946–71)
- Owner: Ministry of War Transport 1944–45; Ministry of Transport 1945–46; New Zealand Shipping Co 1946–66; Federal Steam Nav Co 1966–1971
- Operator: New Zealand Shipping Co 1945–68
- Port of registry: 1944: Belfast; 1946: London
- Builder: Harland & Wolff, Belfast
- Yard number: 1230
- Launched: 30 December 1944
- Completed: 30 June 1945
- In service: 1945
- Out of service: 28 March 1968
- Identification: UK official number 168539; call sign GFGW; IMO number: 5289481
- Fate: Scrapped in Hong Kong, 1971

General characteristics
- Tonnage: 8,563 GRT, 4,350 NRT, 9,633 DWT
- Length: 474 ft 2 in (144.53 m)
- Beam: 63 ft 3 in (19.28 m)
- Depth: 34 ft 2 in (10.41 m)
- Installed power: 7,500 hp (5,600 kW)
- Propulsion: 1 × Harland & Wolff two-cycle double-acting 8-cylinder diesel
- Speed: 14.5 knots (26.9 km/h)
- Capacity: 367,902 ft^{3} (10,418 m^{3}) insulated cargo space, 45 passengers (later 40 cadets)
- Sensors & processing systems: wireless direction finding; echo sounding device; gyrocompass
- Notes: sister ship: Empire Clarendon

MV Empire Abercorn was a cargo and passenger ship that was built in 1944, renamed MV Rakaia in 1946 and remained in service until 1971.

== History ==
Empire Abercorn was built by Harland & Wolff, Belfast for the MoWT and was initially managed by the New Zealand Shipping Co, London. She was sold to the New Zealand Shipping Co in 1946 and renamed Rakaia. In 1950, Rakaia was converted to a cadet training ship, and the accommodation reduced from 45 passengers to 40 cadets. Her first voyage in this role started on 10 June 1950. On 16 February 1955, a dockside fire at Wellington, New Zealand, threatened to spread to Arawa, Port Pirie, Rakaia, and Rangitoto.

On 16 October 1957, on a voyage between New York City and Liverpool, No. 8 piston rod in the engine snapped. The ship was about 300 miles (480 km) off Halifax at the time. The weather deteriorated, and the ship was rolling, making repairs difficult. To stabilize Rakaia, it was decided to jury rig a set of sails. Tarpaulin sails were made from hatch covers. Two square sails and one staysail were erected, giving approximately 2,500 square feet (230 m^{2}) of sail. The engine was reduced from eight to six cylinders, running at a maximum of 50 rpm; it took eleven days to reach Liverpool.

On 28 December 1966, Rakaia was sold to the Federal Steam Navigation Co, remaining under the management of the New Zealand Shipping Co. Her last voyage as a cadet training ship ended on 28 March 1968. Rakaia was sold to the Lee Sing Company, Hong Kong on 22 August 1971 for scrapping.

== Engine and generators ==
Empire Abercorn had an eight-cylinder, two-cycle double-acting diesel engine built by Harland & Wolff. It produced 7,500 hp at 115 rpm. Normal operating speed about 101.2 rpm, giving a fuel consumption of 28 tons per day.

Empire Abercorn had four main generators and one auxiliary generator. The main generators were "Harlandics", built by Harland and Wolff. They were powered by six-cylinder diesel engines of 335 horsepower (250 kW) producing 250 kW each; the auxiliary generator was powered by a three-cylinder diesel engine of 30 horsepower (22 kW) producing 15 kW, voltage was 220 volts.

== Official number and code letters ==
Official numbers were a forerunner to IMO Numbers.

Empire Abercorn had the UK official number 166215 and call sign GFGW. Towards the end of her life, Rakaia was given IMO Number 5289481.
