= SS Empire Arthur =

World War II merchant ship of the United Kingdom

History
- Name: Empire Arthur (1942-49); Merula (1949-51); Adherity (1951-62)
- Owner: Ministry of War Transport (1942-48); Ape Azionaria Petroliere, Italy (1949-51); F. T. Everard & Sons, London (1951-62)
- Port of registry: (United Kingdom) Grangemouth (1942-43); Italy (1949-51); (United Kingdom) London (1951-62)
- Builder: Grangemouth Dockyard
- Yard number: 439
- Launched: 5 March 1942
- Completed: June 1942
- Identification: UK Official Number 168798 (1942-43); Code letters LDWW (1942-43)
- Fate: Scrapped in 1962

General characteristics
- Tonnage: 784 GRT
- Length: 193 ft (58.83 m)
- Beam: 30 ft 7 in (9.32 m)
- Depth: 14 ft 1 in (4.29 m)
- Propulsion: 1 x triple expansion steam engine (Rowland & Co Ltd, Glasgow)

SS Empire Arthur was a 784-ton coastal tanker which was built in 1942. She saw service mainly in British coastal waters during the Second World War, and was briefly used as an auxiliary, supporting Royal Navy operations off western Africa. Her capsize in 1943 put an end to this, but she was salvaged post-war and returned to service for several companies, under the names Merula, and then Adherity, before being scrapped in 1962.

== Wartime career ==
Empire Arthur was built by Grangemouth Dockyard, Grangemouth as yard number 439. She was launched on 5 March 1942 and completed in June 1942. Empire Arthur was built for the Ministry of War Transport and managed by Rowbotham & Sons.

She was requisitioned to serve as a water carrier in October 1942, and used as an auxiliary to supply naval ships and merchants. She served in a number of convoys during the war, spent mostly sailing between British ports, particularly Methil, Oban and Southend, and several times visiting Loch Ewe, an assembly point for merchants and naval escorts assigned to the Arctic convoys. She sailed in ballast from Liverpool on 11 July 1942 as part of convoy OS 34, and arrived at Freetown on 30 July 1942. She remained stationed at Freetown until capsizing there on 22 November 1943. Two men were killed in the sinking, Master Fraser Ernest Smith and Chief Engineering Officer Andrew M. Booth, whose name was inscribed on the City of Dundee's Roll of Honour. The stricken Empire Arthur was assessed, but declared a total loss.

== Post-war ==
It was not until 1948, several years after the end of the Second World War, that the Empire Arthur was completely salvaged. She was duly repaired and returned to service in 1949, sailing with the Italian shipping firm, Ape Azionaria Petroliere as the Merula. Her service with her Italian owners was short, and by 1951 she was owned by the London-based F. T. Everard & Sons, and had been renamed Adherity. She sailed with them until 1962, when she was scrapped at Lekkerkerk, in the Netherlands.

== Official number and code letters ==
Official Numbers were a forerunner to IMO Numbers.

Empire Arthur had the UK Official Number 168798. Empire Arthur used the Code Letters LDWW.

== Notes ==
8. Registers and Indexes of Births, Marriages and Deaths of Passengers and Seamen at Sea – BT334
