= MV Empire Alderney =

World War II merchant ship of the United Kingdom

History
- Name: Empire Alderney (1943-46); Mil 50 (1946-55), Max S (1955-80)
- Owner: Ministry of War Transport (1943-46); Norsk Tankanlaeg A/S, Norway (1946-55); Partenrederei Max S, West Germany (1955-58); Marina Mercante Nicaragüense, Nicaragua (1958-59); Compagnia Maritima Mundial, Nicaragua(1959-80); Trafford Holdings Ltd, Cayman Islands (1980-)
- Operator: Owner operated except:-; T J Metcalfe (1944-46); M.Sotje, West Germany (1955-58); Manemic Lines, Nicaragua (1958-59)
- Port of registry: (United Kingdom) Goole (1943-46); Norway (1946-55); West Germany (1955-58); Nicaragua (1955-80); Cayman Islands (1980-)
- Builder: J Harker Ltd, Knottingley
- Yard number: 166
- Launched: 11 December 1943
- Completed: June 1944
- Identification: IMO number: 5229974; UK Official Number 180114 (1944-46); Code letters MQNH (1944-46)

General characteristics
- Tonnage: 288 GRT
- Length: 136 ft 4 in (41.55 m)
- Beam: 21 ft 5 in (6.53 m)
- Depth: 8 ft 5 in (2.57 m)
- Propulsion: 2 x 6-cylinder SCDA oil engines (Crossley, Manchester) 330 hp (250 kW)
- Speed: 15 knots (28 km/h)
- Capacity: 129,000 cubic feet (3,700 m^{3}) refrigerated cargo space

Empire Alderney was a 288-ton coastal tanker which was built in 1943. She was renamed Mil 50 in 1946 and Max S in 1955. Her fate is unknown, last being registered in the Cayman Islands in 1980.

== History ==
Empire Alderney was built by J. Harker Ltd., Knottingley as yard number 166. She had a 330 horsepower (250 kW) Crossley engine. Empire Alderney was launched on 11 December 1943 and completed in June 1944. She was built for the Ministry of War Transport and managed by T J Metcalf.

In 1946, Empire Alderney was sold to Norsk Tankanlaeg of Norway and renamed Mil 50. She served with them for nine years and was sold to Partenrederei Max S, West Germany in 1955, being renamed Max S. In 1958, she was sold to the Marina Mercante Nicaragüense, Nicaragua, passing to the Compagnia Maritima Mundia in 1959. Max S was last recorded as being registered to Trafford Holdings Ltd, Cayman Islands in 1980.

== Official number and code letters ==
Official Numbers were a forerunner to IMO Numbers.

Empire Alderney had the UK Official Number 180114 from 1943 to 1946 and used the Code Letters MQNH until 1946.
