= MV California Star (1945) =

Refrigerated cargo liner built in 1945

History

United Kingdom
- Name: Empire Clarendon (1945–47); Tuscan Star (1947–48); Timaru Star (1948–58); California Star (1958–69)
- Namesake: Tuscany, Italy (1947–48); Timaru, New Zealand (1948–58); California, USA (1958–69)
- Owner: Ministry of War Transport (1945); Ministry of Transport (1945–46); Frederick Leyland & Co Ltd (1946–49); Lamport and Holt Line Ltd (1949–59); Blue Star Line Ltd (1959–69)
- Operator: Peninsular & Orient Steam Navigation Co Ltd (1945–47); Blue Star Line Ltd (1947–49); Lamport and Holt Line Ltd (1949–59); Blue Star Line Ltd (1959–69)
- Port of registry: Belfast (1945–47); London (1947–69)
- Builder: Harland & Wolff Ltd, Belfast
- Yard number: 1231
- Launched: 14 May 1945
- Completed: 26 October 1945
- Identification: Call sign GKKM; UK official number 168540; IMO Number 5058002 ( –1969)
- Fate: Scrapped in 1969

General characteristics
- Class & type: refrigerated cargo liner
- Tonnage: 8,577 GRT; tonnage under deck 6,826; 6,826 NRT
- Length: 457.3 ft (139.4 m)
- Beam: 63.3 ft (19.3 m)
- Draught: 37 ft 8 in (11.48 m)
- Depth: 35 ft (11 m)
- Installed power: 2SC DA diesel engine
- Propulsion: Screw propeller
- Speed: 14 knots (26 km/h)
- Capacity: 35 passengers (1945–48); 12 passengers (1948–69)
- Sensors & processing systems: wireless direction finding; echo sounding device; gyrocompass
- Notes: sister ship: Empire Abercorn

MV California Star was an 8,577 GRT refrigerated cargo liner that was built in 1945 as Empire Clarendon by Harland & Wolff Ltd, Belfast for the Ministry of War Transport (MoWT). In 1947 she was sold and renamed Tuscan Star, then Timaru Star in 1948. She was sold again in 1950 and was renamed California Star in 1959. She was scrapped in 1969.

== Description ==
Harland and Wolff Ltd built the ship at Belfast as yard number 1231. She was launched on 4 May 1945 and completed in October 1945.

The ship was 457 feet 3 inches (139.37 m) long, with a beam of 63 feet 3 inches (19.28 m) and a depth of 30 feet 0 inches (9.14 m). Her tonnages were 8,577 gross register tons (GRT) and 6,826 net register tons (NRT). Accommodation was provided for 35 passengers. This was reduced to 12 in 1948.

The ship was propelled by a Burmeister & Wain-type two-stroke single cycle double-acting marine diesel engine that had eight cylinders of 21 1/2 inches (55 cm) diameter by 63 inches (160 cm) stroke.

== History ==
Empire Clarendon was built for the MoWT. She was a sister ship to Empire Abercorn.

On 27 November 1946, Empire Clarendon was sold to Frederick Leyland & Co Ltd. She was placed under the management of the Blue Star Line Ltd. In 1947 she was renamed Tuscan Star, followed by another renaming to Timaru Star in 1948. In 1949, she was sold to Lamport & Holt Line Ltd, Liverpool. She was renamed California Star in 1958, and sold to the Blue Star Line Ltd in 1959. With the introduction of IMO Numbers, 5058002 was allocated to California Star. In March 1968 California Star was laid up in the River Blackwater, Essex. Re-entering service by July 1968, she served until 1969, when she was sold to Tsuan Yau Steel & Iron Works Co Ltd. She arrived on 21 April 1969 at Kaohsiung, Taiwan for scrapping, which was commenced on 20 May 1969.
