= MV Pelikan =

History
- Name: Pelikan (1934-45); Empire Alde (1945-46); Pelikan (1946-47); Pacuare (1947-59)
- Owner: Afrikanische Frucht-Cie AG (1935-40); Kriegsmarine (1940-45); Ministry of War Transport (1945-46); Elders & Fyffes Ltd (1946-59)
- Operator: Reederei F Laeisz GmbH, Hamburg (1935-45); Southern Railway (1945-46); Kaye, Son and Co (1946); Elders & Fyffes Ltd (946-59)
- Port of registry: (Nazi Germany) Hamburg (1935-40); (Nazi Germany) Kriegsmarine (1940-45); (United Kingdom) London (1945-59)
- Builder: Bremer Vulkan Schiff- und Maschinenbau, Bremen
- Yard number: 712
- Launched: 1934
- Completed: January 1935
- Identification: UK Official Number 181664 (1945-59); Code letters DJNP (1935-46)
- Fate: Scrapped in Troon, 1959

General characteristics
- Tonnage: 3,264 GRT
- Length: 352 ft 8 in (107.49 m)
- Beam: 44 ft 8 in (13.61 m)
- Depth: 24 ft (7.32 m)
- Propulsion: 2 x 5 cylinder SCDA oil engines (Bremer Vulkan) 975 hp (727 kW)
- Speed: 15 knots (28 km/h)
- Capacity: 129,000 cubic feet (3,700 m^{3}) refrigerated cargo space

Pelikan was a 3,264 ton German refrigerated cargo ship built in 1934. In 1945, during the Second World War, the United Kingdom seized her and renamed her Empire Alde. She changed names twice more: back to Pelikan in 1946, and to Pacuare in 1947. She was scrapped in 1959/60.

== History ==
Pelikan was built by Bremer Vulkan Schiff- und Maschinenbau, Bremen as yard number 712 and launched in 1934, being completed in January 1935. She was owned by the Afrikanische Frucht-Cie AG and managed by F Laeisz, Hamburg. In 1940, ownership passed to the Kriegsmarine (German navy) although Lloyds Register continued to show Pelikan as a merchant ship. In May 1945 Pelikan was seized at Brunsbüttel, and ownership passed to the Ministry of War Transport; she was renamed Empire Alde, under the management of the Southern Railway and later Kaye, Sons & Co. In 1946 Empire Alde was sold to Elders & Fyffes Ltd, regaining her original name of Pelikan before being renamed Pacuare in 1947. She served until 1959, when she was sent to Troon for scrapping, arriving on 22 September.

== Official number and code letters ==
Official Numbers were a forerunner to IMO Numbers.

Pelikan used the Code Letters DJNP until 1945. Empire Alde, Pelican and Pacuare used the UK Official Number 181664 from 1945-59
