= SS Culross =

Cargo ship

History
- Name: Empire Antigua (1945-46); Culross (1946-60); Akastos (1960-68); Marina (1968)
- Owner: Ministry of War Transport (1945-46); South Georgia Co (1946-60); Navigazione y de Comercio Apolo Ltda, Lebanon (1960-67); Blue X Transocean Co, Athens (1967-68)
- Operator: Dodd, Thompson & Co (1946); Christian Salvesen, Leith (1946-58); N J Vlassopulos, Greece (1960-66); Aegis Shipping, Greece (1966-67); I Chiotakis, Greece (1967-68)
- Port of registry: (United Kingdom) Newcastle (1945-60); Lebanon (1960-61); Greece (1961-66); Cyprus (1966-68)
- Builder: Shipbuilding Corporation Ltd, Newcastle upon Tyne
- Yard number: 12
- Launched: 20 November 1945
- Completed: February 1946
- Out of service: 1968
- Identification: UK Official Number 169207 (1945-60); Code letters GDTB (1945-46)
- Fate: Scrapped 1968

General characteristics
- Tonnage: 7,331 GRT
- Length: 431 ft 2 in (131.42 m)
- Beam: 56 ft 3 in (17.15 m)
- Depth: 35 ft 6 in (10.82 m)
- Propulsion: 1 x triple expansion steam engine (J Dickinson & Sons Ltd, Sunderland)

SS Culross was a 7,331 ton cargo ship which was built as Empire Antigua in 1945. She was renamed Culross in 1946. In 1960, she was renamed Akastos, serving under a number of flags until 1968 when she was renamed Marina, being scrapped in that year.

== History ==
Empire Antelope was built by Shipbuilding Corporation Ltd, Newcastle upon Tyne as yard number 12. She was launched on 20 November 1945 and completed in February 1946. Empire Antelope was built for the Ministry of War Transport and managed by Dodd, Thompson & Co Ltd. In 1946, she was sold to the South Georgia Company, and renamed Culross She operated under the management of Christian Salvesen Ltd, Leith. In 1958, she was laid up at Gairloch. In 1960, Culross was sold to Navigazione y de Comercio Apolo Ltda, Lebanon and renamed Akastos. In 1961, she was reflagged to Greece. She was operated under the management of N J Vlassopulous, London between 1960 and 1966 when she was reflagged to Cyprus and management was transferred to Aegis Shipping Ltd, London. In 1967, Akastos was sold to the Blue Cross Transocean Co, Athens. She was renamed Marina in 1967 and scrapped in Hamburg later that year, arriving on 4 August 1968

== Official Number and code letters ==
Official Numbers were a forerunner to IMO Numbers.

Empire Antigua and Culross used the UK Official Number 169207. Empire Antigua used Code Letters GDTB.
