= SS Belgian =

Steamship

History
- Name: Belgian (1919–1934); Amelia Lauro (1934–1940); Empire Activity (1940–1941)
- Owner: F Leyland & Co Ltd (1919–1934); Achille Lauro, Naples (1934–1940); Ministry of War Transport (1940–1941)
- Operator: As owner except:-; Galbraith, Pembroke & Co Ltd (1940-41)
- Port of registry: (United Kingdom) Liverpool (1919–1934); (Italy) Naples (1934–1940); (United Kingdom) London (1940–1941)
- Builder: Swan Hunter & Wigham Richardson, Newcastle upon Tyne
- Yard number: 1139
- Launched: 29 August 1919
- In service: October 1919
- Identification: UK Official Number 140659 (1919–1934, 1940–1941); Italian Official Number 423 (1934–1940); Code letters KCQH (1919–1934); Code letters IBEZ (1934–1940); Code letters GQXX (1940–1941)
- Fate: Wrecked 3 October 1943

General characteristics
- Tonnage: 5,287 GRT
- Length: 400 ft 3 in (122.00 m)
- Beam: 52 ft 4 in (15.95 m)
- Depth: 28 ft 4 in (8.64 m)
- Propulsion: 1 × triple expansion steam engine of 517 hp (386 kW)
- Speed: 12 knots (22 km/h)

SS Belgian was a 5,287-ton steamship which was built in 1919, sold in 1934 becoming Amelia Lauro, seized in 1940 and renamed Empire Activity and wrecked in 1943.

== History ==
Belgian was built by Swan Hunter and Wigham Richardson Ltd, Wallsend and launched on 29 August 1919, being completed in October 1919. From 1919 to 1934 Belgian was owned by the Leyland Line. In 1934, she was sold to Achille Lauro, and renamed Amelia Lauro.

On 7 March 1940, Amelia Lauro was damaged by German bombing at 52°55′N 02°19′E en route from Newcastle upon Tyne to Piombino laden with coal. She was set on fire and the crew anchored her, then abandoned her. SS Titania rescued 37 of the crew, and the sloops Pintail and Londonderry assisted. Amelia Lauro was escorted to Immingham with her superstructure burnt out. One crew member was killed outright and three were wounded. One of the wounded crewmen later died from his injuries. In an expression of gratitude, Lauro Lines owner Achille Lauro donated £26. 5s to the Royal National Lifeboat Institution in appreciation of assistance rendered by the Great Yarmouth and Gorleston lifeboat in bringing 29 crew to shore. Permission was given for temporary repairs to be carried out.

As a consequence of Italy's declaration of war on 10 June 1940, Amelia Lauro was seized as a prize of war. The seizure was ratified by the prize court on 4 May 1941. Amelia Lauro was taken over by the Ministry of War Transport, being renamed Empire Activity. Galbraith, Pembroke & Co were appointed managers. On 3 October 1943, Empire Activity was wrecked on Peckford Reef Newfoundland at 49°30′38″N 53°51′30″W, one nautical mile (1.9 km; 1.2 mi) south of the Peckford Reef. She was en route from Botwood to the United Kingdom laden with zinc concentrates.

== Official Number and code letters ==
Official Numbers were a forerunner to IMO Numbers.

Belgian had the UK Official Number 140659. Amelia Lauro had the Italian Official Number 423 Empire Activity had the UK Official Number 140659.

Belgian used the Code Letters KCQH. Amelia Lauro used the Code Letters IBEZ. Empire Activity used the Code Letters GQXX.
