= SS Empire Abbey =

World War II merchant ship of the United Kingdom

History
- Name: Empire Abbey (1943-46); Teviot (1946-60); Ardellis (1960-63); Tung An (1963-66)
- Owner: Ministry of War Transport (1943-46); Royal Mail Lines (1946-60); Mullion & Co, Hong Kong (1960-63); Hai An Shipping Co, Hong Kong (1963-67)
- Operator: Elders & Fyffes Ltd (1944-46); Thereafter owner operated
- Port of registry: (United Kingdom) Newcastle upon Tyne (1944-1960); (United Kingdom) Hong Kong (1960-67)
- Builder: Shipbuilding Corporation Ltd., Newcastle upon Tyne
- Yard number: 6
- Launched: 10 December 1943
- Completed: March 1944
- In service: 1944
- Out of service: 1966
- Identification: UK Official Number 169178 (1944-60); Code letters BFKK (1944-60)
- Fate: Scrapped at Kaohsiung, Taiwan 1967

General characteristics
- Tonnage: 7,032 GRT
- Length: 430 ft 9 in (131.29 m)
- Beam: 56 ft 2 in (17.12 m)
- Depth: 35 ft 2 in (10.72 m)
- Propulsion: 1 x North East Marine Engine Co (1938) Ltd triple expansion steam engine
- Speed: 10 knots (19 km/h)

SS Empire Abbey was a refrigerated cargo ship built in 1943 and in service until 1966. She was also known as SS Teviot, SS Ardilles and SS Tung An.

== History ==
=== War service ===
Empire Abbey was built by Shipbuilding Corporation Ltd, Newcastle upon Tyne for the MoWT and launched on 10 December 1943 and completed in March 1944. She was placed under the management of Elders & Fyffes Ltd. On 26 April 1944, Empire Abbey sailed from New York as part of Convoy HX289, arriving in Liverpool on 13 May. On 23 November 1944, Empire Abbey sailed from Milford Haven as part of Convoy OS96 bound for Gibraltar, Empire Abbey was in ballast, with a final destination of Buenos Aires. On 15 February 1945, Empire Abbey was in a collision with Free French Ship L'Ardent in Cora Harbour which resulted in L'Ardent being sunk.

=== Postwar ===
In February 1946, Empire Abbey, en route to Europe laden with food, was hit by a storm off Newfoundland which lasted for over three weeks. On the 16th day of the storm, her propeller shaft broke off, leaving Empire Abbey drifting without propulsion. On the 24th day, the tug Foundation Franklin managed to take Empire Abbey in tow. A message was sent from Empire Abbey that the captain had died after thirteen days without sleep. In May 1946 she was sold to Royal Mail Line and renamed Teviot, the third Royal Mail Line ship to bear that name. In 1959, Teviot was laid up.

In 1960, Teviot was sold to Mullion & Co, Hong Kong and renamed Ardellis, She was sold to Hai An Shipping Co in 1963 and being renamed Tung An. She arrived for scrapping in Kaohsiung, Taiwan on 6 August 1967.

== Official number and code letters ==
Official Numbers were a forerunner to IMO Numbers.

Empire Abbey had the UK Official Number 169178 and used the Code Letters BFKK.
