= SS Empire Aden =

World War II merchant ship of the United Kingdom

History
- Name: Empire Aden (1945-48); Etivebank (1948-56); Alcyone Fortune (1956-58); Northern Venture (1958-67)
- Owner: Ministry of War Transport (1945-48); A Weir & Co (1948-56); Alcyone Shipping Co (1956-58); Pan Norse Steamship Co (1958-67)
- Operator: H Hogarth & Sons (1945-46); A Weir & Co (1946-56); A Vergottis (1956-58); Wallem & Co (1958-66); Wah Kwong & Co (1966-67)
- Port of registry: Sunderland (1945-58); Panama (1958-67)
- Builder: Bartram & Sons, Sunderland
- Yard number: 303
- Launched: 12 February 1945
- Completed: 14 May 1945
- Out of service: 9 June 1967
- Identification: UK Official Number 180156 (1945-58); Code letters GDMK (1945-58)
- Fate: Ran aground off Okinawa, 9 June 1967; 26°44′45″N 128°21′00″E

General characteristics
- Tonnage: 7,308 GRT
- Length: 431 ft 2 in (131.42 m)
- Beam: 56 ft 3 in (17.15 m)
- Depth: 35 ft 6 in (10.82 m)
- Propulsion: 1 x triple expansion steam engine of 510 hp (380 kW)

SS Empire Aden was a 7,308 ton steamship which was built in 1945 for the Ministry of War Transport (MoWT), she was sold in 1948 becoming Etivebank, and sold in 1956 and renamed Alcyone Fortune. In 1958, she was sold to Panama and renamed Northern Venture serving until running aground off Okinawa in 1967.

== History ==
Empire Addison was built by Bartram & Sons Ltd, Sunderland and launched on 12 February 1945, being completed on 14 May. Initially she was managed by H Hogarth & Sons, but management passed to A Weir & Co in 1946. In 1948, she was sold to A Weir & Sons, and renamed Etivebank, managed by A Vergottis. On 15 December 1950, Etivebank ran aground at Licata, Italy after an anchor chain broke in heavy weather. HMS Gravelines and RFA Sea Salvor went to her aid. On 23 February 1951, Etivebank was damaged in an incident involving the SS Texas in the Suez Canal. The owners of Texas were unsuccessfully sued for damages, a decision which was upheld on appeal.

In 1956, she was sold to Alcyone Shipping Co, London and renamed Alcyone Fortune, serving for two years before being sold to the Pan Norse Steamship Co, Panama when she was reflagged and renamed Northern Venture.

Northern Venture was managed by Wallem & Co, Hong Kong until 1966, when management passed to Wak Kwong & Co. On 9 June 1967, Northern Venture ran aground off Okinawa en route from Tsumuki to Manila. She broke in two and was declared a total loss. Northern Venture was sold for scrapping locally.

== Official number and code letters ==
Official Numbers were a forerunner to IMO Numbers.

Empire Aden had the UK Official Number 180156 and used the Code Letters GDMK.
