= SS Empire Austen =

World War II merchant ship of the United Kingdom

- SS Freecrest at Tilbury

History
- Name: Empire Austen (1942-49); Frinton (1949-51); Freecrest (1951-55); Fairwater (1955-61); APJ Usha (1961-62)
- Owner: Ministry of War Transport (1942-49); Frinton Shipping (1949-51); Crest Shipping (1951-55); International Navigation Corporation, Liberia (1955-61); Surrendra (Overseas) Private Ltd, Bombay (1961-62)
- Operator: Honeyman & Co (1942-46); Counties Ship Management (1946-51); Ivanovic & Co, London (1951-55); Tidewater Commercial Co Inc, Baltimore (1955-61); Surrendra (Overseas) Private Ltd, Bombay (1961-62)
- Port of registry: (United Kingdom) Greenock (1942-55); Liberia (1955-59); (India) Bombay (1959-62)
- Builder: Lithgow's, Port Glasgow
- Yard number: 969
- Launched: 24 March 1942
- Identification: Official Number 168983 (1942-55); Code Letters BDTF (1942-49)
- Fate: Scrapped 1962

General characteristics
- Tonnage: 7,057 GRT; 4,295 NRT; 10,050 DWT
- Length: 432 ft 2 in (131.72 m)
- Beam: 56 ft 2 in (17.12 m)
- Depth: 34 ft 2 in (10.41 m)
- Propulsion: 1 triple expansion steam engine (J G Kincaid, Greenock) 520 hp (390 kW)

Empire Austen was a 7,027 ton cargo ship which was built in 1942. She was renamed Frinton in 1949, Freecrest in 1951, Fairwater in 1955 and APJ Usha in 1961. She was scrapped in 1962.

== History ==
Empire Austen was built by Lithgows Ltd, Port Glasgow as yard number 969. She was launched on 24 March 1942 and completed in May. She was built for the Ministry of War Transport and placed under the management of Honeyman & Co.

=== War service ===
Empire Austen was a member of a number of convoys during the Second World War.

KMS 22

Convoy KMS 22 departed Gibraltar on 9 August 1943 and arrived at Port Said on 20 August. Empire Austen was on a voyage from Malta to Alexandria

MKS 27

Convoy MKS 27 departed Gibraltar on 14 October 1943 and arrived at Liverpool on 28 October. Empire Austen was carrying a cargo of cotton and military stores bound for Manchester.

OS 60

Empire Austen was listed as a member of Convoy OS 60 which departed Liverpool on 23 November 1943 and arrived at Freetown, Sierra Leone on 18 December. She did not sail with the convoy.

KMS 35

Convoy KMS 35 departed Gibraltar on 22 December 1943 and arrived at Port Said on 1 January 1944. Empire Austen was bound for Algiers.

=== Postwar ===
In 1946, management of Empire Austen passed to Counties Ship Management (CSM). In 1949 she was sold to Frinton Shipping Ltd and renamed Frinton, operating under CSM's management. Frinton was sold to Crest Shipping Co Ltd in 1951 and renamed Freecrest. She operated under the management of Ivanovich & Co Ltd, London. In 1955, Freecrest was sold to the International Navigation Corporation, Liberia and renamed Fairwater, operating under the management of Tidewater Commercial Co Inc, Baltimore. In 1961, Fairwater was sold to Surrendra (Overseas) Private Ltd, Bombay and renamed APD Usha. She was scrapped in Bombay in 1962.

== Official number and code letters ==
Official Numbers were a forerunner to IMO Numbers.

Empire Austen had the UK Official Number 168983 and used the Code Letters BDTF
