= Empire ship =

Type of British merchant ship

An Empire ship is a merchant ship that was given a name beginning with "Empire" in the service of the Government of the United Kingdom during and after World War II. Most were used by the Ministry of War Transport (MoWT), which owned them and contracted their operation to various shipping companies of the British Merchant Navy.

Empire ships came from two main sources: new construction, and capture and seizure. New Empire ships were built for the MoWT or obtained from the United States to increase Britain's shipping capacity and offset losses to German U-boats, commerce raiders, bombing and other enemy actions in the tonnage war Germany was waging against Britain's sea transport around the globe. Others were captured or seized from enemy powers and some were acquired by requisition or normal purchase or lease.

New Empire ship construction represented an big undertaking that included classes of freighters, tankers, aircraft carriers, fast cargo liners, tank landing ships, deep-sea salvage and rescue tugs and several other categories. Total production numbered in the hundreds.

Empire ships were supplements to Britain's normal peacetime merchant fleet, swelling its wartime numbers to 12,000, then the largest merchant ship fleet in the world. Approximately 4,000 ships on the British register were lost between 1939 and 1945, a considerable number being sunk during the Battle of the Atlantic.

== Introduction of standard specifications ==
Significantly before Britain entered the Second World War on 3 September 1939, preparations had been in hand to put the shipping industry of Britain on a war footing. All shipbuilders had specified the capability of their yards to produce cargo ships, cargo liners, tramps, tankers, colliers, coasters and naval ships.

The Ministry of Shipping, formed in October 1939 quickly adopted a standard naming system, applying the prefix "Empire" for all merchant ships built in Great Britain for the Government. With some exceptions, the prefix was also extended to purchased or requisitioned ships and to those acquired as prizes.

From 1 February 1940, the Admiralty took control of all shipbuilding and repairs, including merchant shipping. From that date, ships could only be built either on orders of the Admiralty or, for private owners, under licences that required the ships to be built to Admiralty specifications of wartime requirements.

== Types of ships built for the MOWT ==
=== Tramps ===
Tramp ships were built to a standardised prefabricated (PF) design. The ships were 425 feet (130 m) in length with a beam of 56 feet (17.1 m), with a deadweight of around 10,000 tons and a speed of around 10 knots (19 km/h). The first standard to be used was the PF(B) of about 7,050 GRT. These incorporated one 30-ton, two 10-ton and eight 5-ton derricks for cargo handling.

The PF(C) design was introduced in 1942 to handle heavier military equipment, and was equipped with one 50-ton, one 30-ton, five 10-ton and five 5-ton derricks. PF(C) were around 7,320 gross tons. The later PF(D) was similar to PF(C), at 7,370 tons, but could be distinguished by a full-height poop (which was only half height in the PF(C)). Some had 250,000 cubic feet (7,100 m^{3}) of refrigerated space.

=== Coasters ===
Empire F was a series of small coasters of 142 feet (43 m) in length with a gross tonnage of 410 GT. with one single diesel engine, two holds and two 1.5 tons derricks. The hull was the same as the small coastal tanker series (CHANT); despite being a completely separate class from the tankers, the dry cargo Empire Fs were always known by coasting seamen as "CHANTs", possibly because they had the same hull form and initially all the tankers were sold to foreign owners and therefore there was no conflict in nomenclature.

Accommodation was good because the five berth cabin for the DEMS gunners was available and several vessels were modified after the war to make better use of all the spaces. The major shortfall of the class was undoubtedly their poor deadweight carrying capacity coupled with their varied engine fit, particularly those with the Petters engine which caused problems in all the vessels in which they were fitted.

Four Empire F class and one Empire Shelt class vessels crossed the Atlantic in the late fifties for service on the St. Lawrence River: Empire Fairway, Empire Fabric, Empire Fang, Empire Fathom, and Empire Seagreen.

=== Coastal tankers ===
The beach craft were refuelled by a shuttle service of coastal tankers that bunkered in southern UK ports whilst five 12,000 ton tankers carried the water, two always at the beachhead with the remaining three in transit. From the two tankers at the beachhead other smaller tankers then shipped the water to depot ships and warships they also replenished the LBWs. This method of replenishment was in operation until D-Day plus forty when it became possible to use the captured channel ports. Their respective peacetime crews manned the Store and Replenishment crews of all the ships and barges albeit dressed in naval uniform; the ten CHANTS (Channel Tankers) were allocated to the Beach services of the Royal Navy.

The bulk of these ships came under the Ministry of War Transport and carried oil to the storage tanks at Port-en-Bessin, others under control of the Royal Navy carried diesel, petrol and water, all destined for the advancing armies. This particular class of ship was not renowned for its stability and when loaded had to carry much ballast, as well as cargo in their tanks they also carried up to ten tons of lubricating oil on deck and were well armed considering their vulnerability. On D-Day plus three Chant 60 turned turtle when manoeuvring under full helm, fortunately her entire crew were rescued later, carrying a full load of petrol she was towed away from the beach and sunk by a British destroyer. Chant 69, this time carrying water performed a similar evolution a short while later. It was then decided to bring all the class into the confines of the gooseberry shelters until a Royal Navy Constructor could carry out stability tests.

Others carried out sterling service, Chant 23 lying off Sword Beach had been hit by an enemy shell in her engine room and disabled but still continued to fuel anything that came alongside. Chant 7 was driven ashore after capsizing during the gales of 18/20 June when loaded with petrol and Chant 26 drove ashore on the crest of a wave, straight up the beach, through a hedge and landed in a field the right way up. After discharging her precious cargo to army bowsers she was dragged back to her natural element and towed home, the author Captain E. E. Sigart made the observation that Chant 26 was the only British merchantman to fly proudly the Red Ensign and discharge her cargo, literally in a foreign field.

Chant 24 beached at Le Hamel carrying 200 tons of oil fuel for the RAF needed for the building of runways previously LBO's had carried out this duty with the muscle power supplied by the infantry on their hand pumps. Finally some of the Chants were used as accommodation ships as there uses diminished and after the landings had been completed most returned to the UK and after the war were sold on to commercial operators.

In wartime all ships carried the prefix "Chant" followed by a number. A total of 43 were built and were named Chant 1–12; Chant 22–28; Chant 42–45 and Chant 50–69. Chant 7, Chant 61, Chant 63 and Chant 69 were lost during the war. They were all built in 1944 and had a gross register of just over 400 tons and a deadweight of 400 tons. They measured 148 ft oa by 27 ft beam. They had oil engines giving them a speed of 7½ knots. Chant 12 and Chant 28 were sold to France in 1946 retaining their names. The remaining survivors served various ship owners until their eventual scrapping mostly in the fifties and sixties.The last Chant vessel (Success III, ex-Chant 12) was scrapped in 2002.

=== Tankers ===
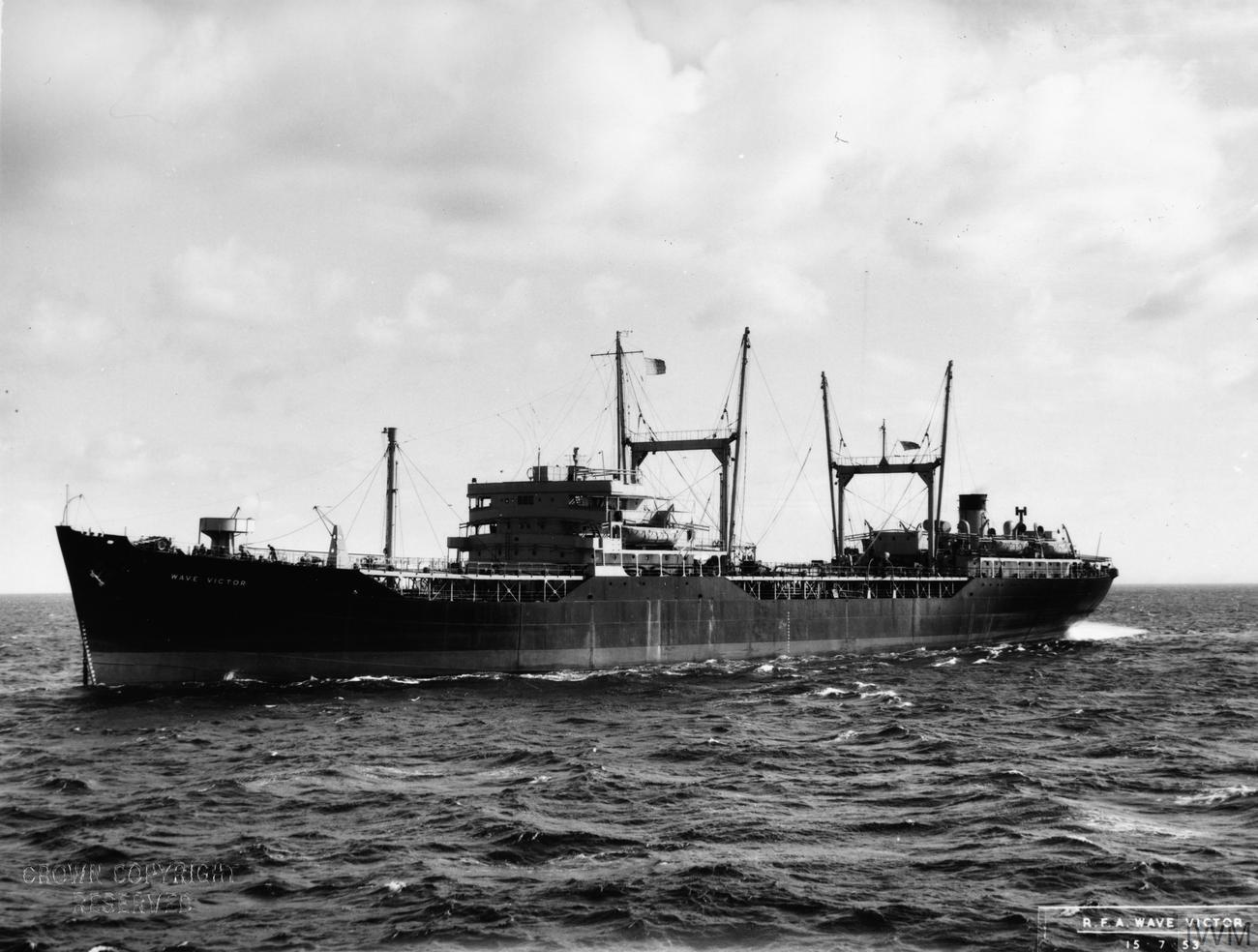
RFA Wave Victor, ex–Empire Bounty

The 'Ocean' type tankers were sometimes known as the 'Three twelves type', being about 12,000 tons deadweight with a speed of around 12 knots (22 km/h) and a fuel consumption of 12 tons per day. They were used for the transport of fuel and also for refuelling at sea. Some were fitted with triple expansion steam engines; others were diesel powered.

The 'Norwegian' type were slightly larger and were constructed only by two builders, Sir James Laing & Sons, at Sunderland (who had built the prototype) and by Furness Shipbuilding Co, Ltd. The first of the type were fitted with 3,800 horsepower (2,800 kW) triple expansion steam engines, later models with 3,300 horsepower (2,500 kW) diesel engines and finally with 4,000 horsepower (3,000 kW) diesel engines.

The design for the 'Wave' prefixed faster tankers was introduced in 1943. With a speed of 15 knots (28 km/h), these fast tankers were able to operate outside the convoys.

=== Aircraft carriers ===
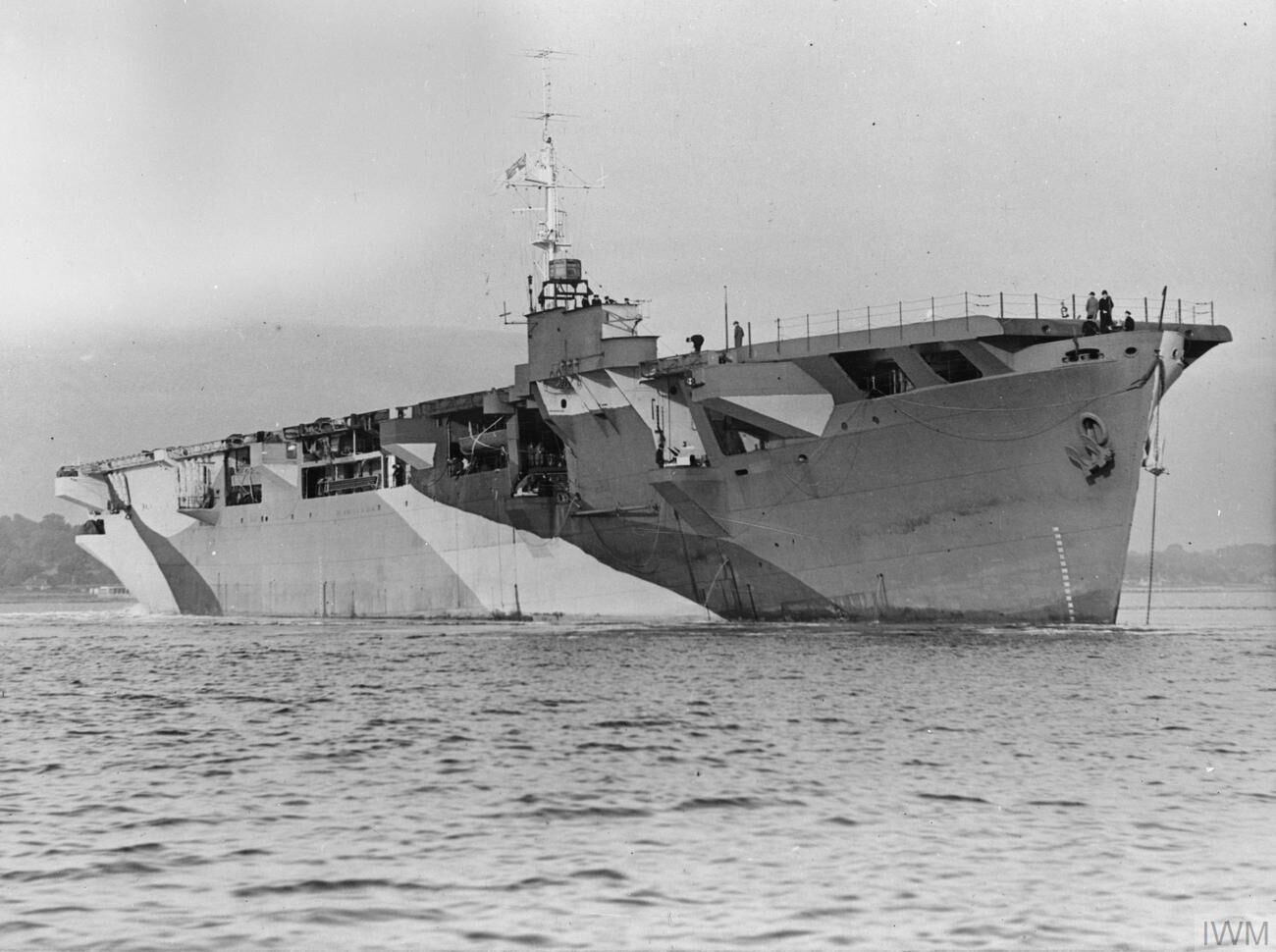
HMS Activity, formerly Empire Activity

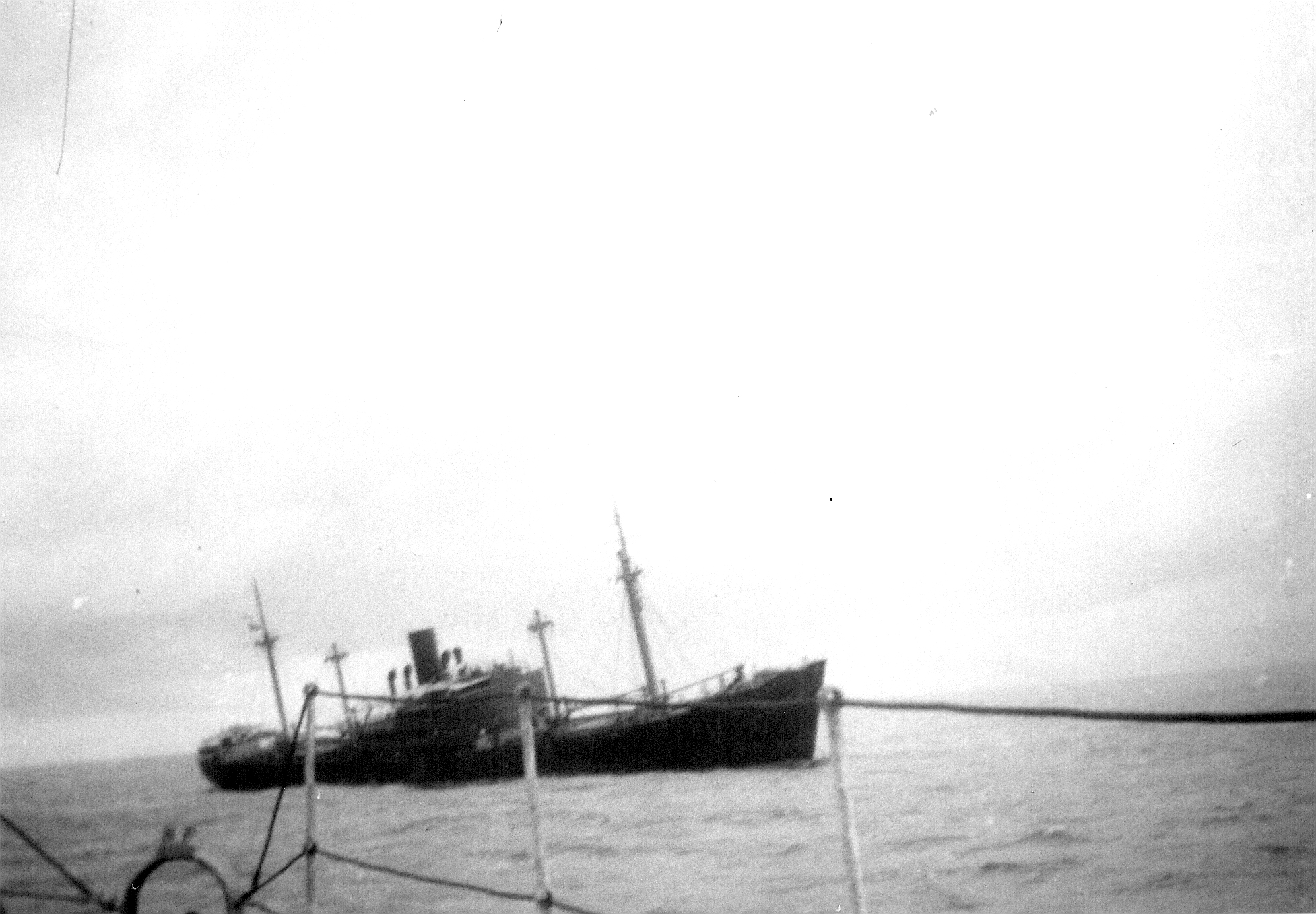
SS Hannover listing before her capture on 6 March 1940; later HMS Audacity

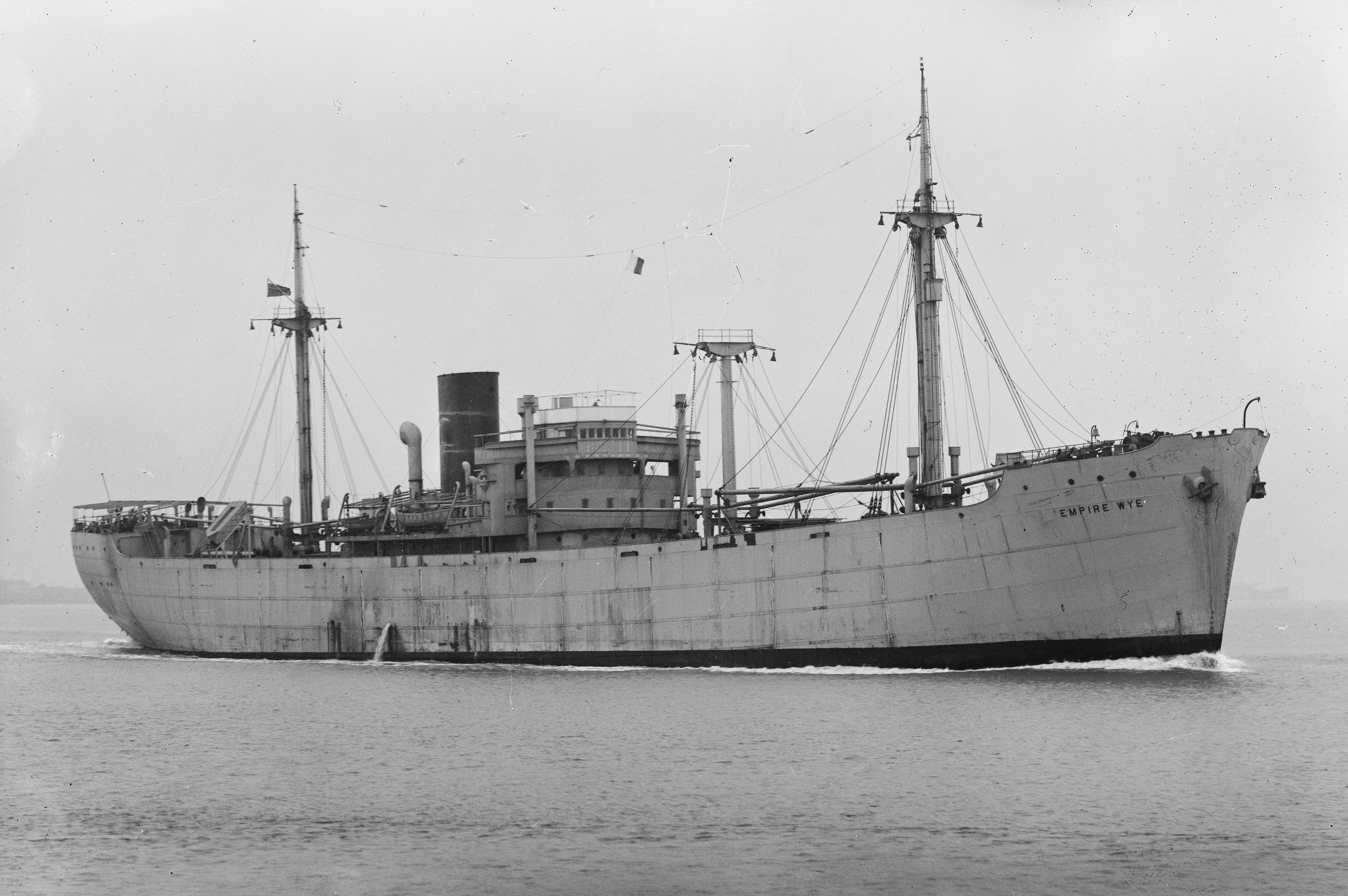
Empire Wye on the river Scheldt

Catapult-armed merchantmen or CAM ships, were merchant cargo ships operating with the convoys and converted to launch a Sea Hurricane fighter by means of a catapult. As there was no means to land the Hurricane on the ship again, it was only possible for a single launch and the aircraft then had to return to land or ditch in the sea. However they did provide important convoy cover when no other air cover was available. Eight requisitioned private ships and 27 Empire ships served as CAM ships. Ten of the Empire ships were lost in service.

Merchant aircraft carriers or MAC ships superseded the CAM ships. Their role was defensive in protection of the convoys. Unlike the CAM ships, they carried a flight deck so the aircraft were able to land again. The merchant air carriers were adapted standard grain ships or oil tankers. The grain ships had a flight deck of 413 feet (126 m) to 424 feet (129 m) ft and a breadth of 62 feet (18.9 m). A hangar on the lower deck was equipped with a lift to the flight deck and accommodated four Fairey Swordfish aircraft. The oil tankers had longer flight decks – 461 feet (141 m) – but no hangars. Three Swordfish reconnaissance planes were stowed at the aft end of the flight deck.

=== Fast cargo liners ===
In the early part of the war shipyard capacity was fully engaged with naval ships, including aircraft carriers, repairs to ships following Dunkirk, and orders for tankers and tramps. By 1941 there was criticism that ships being built were too slow. A few fast ships (capable of 15 to 16 knots (28 to 30 km/h)) were however being built; many of them with refrigerated capacity. In 1942 a new standard for a fast cargo liner of around 9,900 gross tons was introduced with a length of 475 feet (145 m) and a breadth of 64 feet (19.5 m). Thirteen "Empire"-prefixed standard class cargo liners were completed. Another was laid down intending to be given the prefix but was acquired by the Royal Netherlands Government and completed as Modjokerto.

- Non-standard cargo liners: Empire Gala (transferred on completion to the French colonial Gouvernement général de l'Indochine), Empire Pride (converted to a troopship in the shipyard), Empire Song and Empire Trust.
- Refrigerated cargo liners: Empire Abercorn, Empire Clarendon, Empire Grace, Empire Hope, Empire Might, Empire Star (originally laid down as Empire Mercia), Empire Wessex (completed as Port Hobart in 1946) and Empire Wisdom .
- 1942 onwards, standard fast cargo liners (9,900 gross tons): Empire Allenby, Empire Captain, Empire Chieftain, Empire Dynasty, Empire Haig, Empire Joy, Empire Kitchener, Empire Life, Empire Paragon, Empire Regent, Empire Rawlinson and Empire Wilson.

=== Heavy lift ships ===
The design of the heavy lift ship was based on a Norwegian design with a prefix – Bel- (Belmoira and Belpareil were two of this type) intended to carry bulky and heavy cargo such as locomotives and tugs. The ships had three large unobstructed cargo holds and heavy lifting equipment. The first pair of ships built for the Ministry of War Transport, Empire Charmian and Empire Elaine were diesel powered. The remainder, Empire Admiral, Empire Athelstan, Empire Byng, Empire Canute, Empire Ethelbert (launched as Beljeanne in 1946), Empire Marshal, Empire Viceroy and Empire Wallace, were powered by steam turbines to provide more speed and power. These ships were able to carry smaller vessels, such as tugs and landing craft, to support combat operations around the world.

=== Tugs ===
A number of Salvage and Rescue Tugs were built during the war and most were owned by the MoWT and operated by Merchant Shipping companies (notably the United Towing Co.). These ocean going vessels (armed under the DEMS programme) bore little resemblance to the small Harbour or Docking tugs seen in most large ports and often worked alongside the naval tugs of His Majesty's Rescue Tug service, the only distinctions being that they were crewed by Merchant Seamen and flew the Red Ensign instead of the White.

=== Scandinavian-type cargo ships ===
Two classes of ship were based on the Scandinavian design general cargo ship. The smaller 'three island' type of around 2,800 gross tons were built between 1941 and 1944. These vessels played an important role as crane ships in unloading the Arctic convoys at the Russian ports. In the three island class, the boiler was amidships and the cargo handling was grouped around three 'islands' on the superstructure, at the stern, bow and amidships. Ten ships were built in the later and larger (3,500 gross tons) Empire Malta class, which had the boiler aft and the cargo handling grouped around the fore- and main-mast.

- Three Island type: Empire Bard, Empire Beaconsfield, Empire Boswell, Empire Buttress, Empire Candida, Empire Carey, Empire Caxton, Empire Crusoe, Empire Dirk, Empire Dunstan, Empire Elgar, Empire Gareth, Empire Gulliver, Empire Harcourt, Empire Harmony, Empire Jessica, Empire Launcelot, Empire Lorenzo, Empire Melody Empire Mountain, Empire Newcomen, Empire Osborne, Empire Patriot, Empire Pilgrim, Empire Ransom, Empire Record, Empire Seaman, Empire Sedley, Empire Tennyson, 'Empire Thackeray, Empire Toiler, Empire Valour, Empire Warner and Empire Wolfe.
- Empire Malta class: Empire Aldgate, Empire Barbados, Empire Bermuda, Empire Caicos, Empire Jamaica, Empire Labrador, Empire Malta, Empire Newfoundland, Empire Perlis and Empire Southwark.

=== Dredgers and hoppers ===
Dredging and hopper vessels were used for the collection or discharge of aggregates for example in maintaining clear navigation channels and to acquire aggregates from the sea bed.

- Twin screw hopper dredgers: about 2,600 gross tons, length 285 feet (87 m) breadth 52 feet (15.8 m): Empire Forager and Empire Sorcerer
- Suction hopper dredger – 1,747 gross tons, length 256 feet (78 m), breadth 42 feet (12.8 m): Empire Clydesdale
- Bucket dredger – 938 gross tons, length 195 feet (59 m), breadth 40 feet (12 m): Empire Mammoth
- Twin screw hopper with bottom doors – 683 gross tons, length 167 feet (51 m) breadth 33 feet (10.1 m): Empire Dockland, Empire Downland, Empire Grassland, Empire Hartland, Empire Heathland, Empire Marshland, Empire Portland, Empire Upland and Empire Woodland
- Bucket dredger – 512 gross tons, length 160 feet (49 m) breadth 36 feet (11.0 m): Empire Champion, Empire Conjuror, Empire Moorland and Empire Sandboy

=== Tank landing ships ===
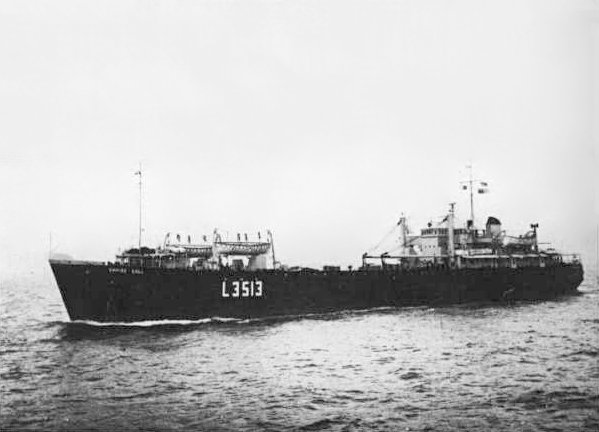
RFA Empire Gull

The tank landing ships (LST Mark 3) had a speed of eleven knots and were 4,820 tons when loaded. The length was 330 ft and the breadth 54 ft. The bridge and engines were aft. A bow ramp gave access to the interior and onto the open upper deck. 168 troops could be accommodated in narrow dormitories. Landing craft were generally only identified by number (for example LST 3512). However, some were completed as merchant ships after the end of hostilities. Seven were charted from the Ministry of War Transport as ferries and given the "Empire" prefix, operating between Tilbury and Hamburg from September 1946 and also between Preston and Larne from May 1948.

- Empire Baltic, Empire Cedric, Empire Celtic, Empire Cymric, Empire Doric, Empire Gaelic, Empire Nordic.

Twelve of the landing craft were recalled to service and given "Empire" names in 1956 during the Suez Crisis and used as military transport ferries in Malta, Aden and Singapore. These were:

- Empire Curlew, Empire Fulmar, Empire Gannet, Empire Grebe, Empire Guillemot, Empire Gull (the second ship to carry the name, the former being torpedoed in 1942). Empire Kittiwake, Empire Petrel, Empire Puffin, Empire Shearwater, Empire Skua and Empire Tern.

=== Ferries ===
Three Empire ferries (Empire Chub, Empire Dace and Empire Roach), were completed to the same design as an order from the Government of Turkey. They had ramps at both ends and could carry passengers and vehicles but could also be converted for minelaying. They were also equipped with a 25-ton derrick at the front of the superstructure amidships. They were 716 gross tons, length 179 feet (55 m) and breadth 40 feet (12.2 m).

=== Water carriers ===
Three vessels of 215 to 222 gross tons were built as water carriers. These were Empire Barnaby, Empire Billow and Empire Fulham

=== Ore carriers ===
Four vessels all of 2,922 gross tons, length 315 feet (96 m) and breadth 44 feet (13.4 m) were built as ore carriers. These were Empire Moat, Empire Ness, Empire Ridge and Empire Stream

=== Convoy rescue ships ===
Five Castle-class corvettes were completed as Empire convoy rescue ships to join 29 previously-requisitioned ships. The requisitioned passenger ships had a speed of 11 to 12 knots to enable them to catch up with the convoys travelling at 10 knots after completing their rescue operations. Convoy rescue ships were also generally armed with AA guns for protection when they were separated from the convoy and vulnerable to enemy attack. The five Empire ships were 1,333 gross tons, length 236 feet (72 m), breadth 36 feet (11.0 m) with a speed of 16 1/2 knots (30.6 km/h). After the war they were used as troopships in the Eastern Mediterranean.

- Empire Comfort, Empire Lifeguard, Empire Peacemaker, Empire Rest and Empire Shelter

== Service ==
=== War service ===
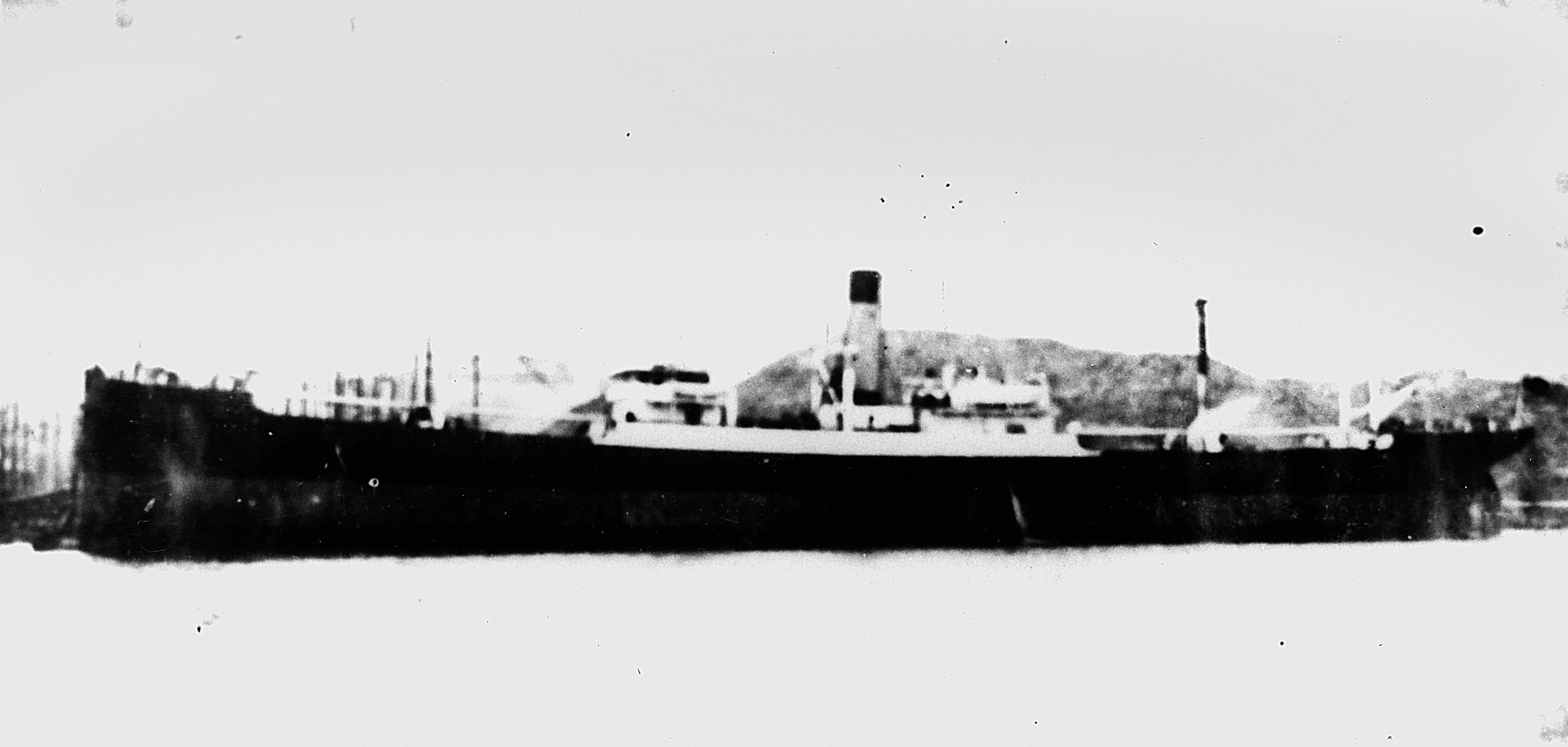
SS Empire Brigade

Empire ships were generally involved in convoy duty, including the Atlantic convoys bringing essential supplies from the United States; military convoys to North Africa; military convoys around the Cape of Good Hope to prosecute the war in the Middle East; coastal convoys around the shores of Britain; Mediterranean convoys, including those supporting the defence of Malta and Arctic convoys to North Russia.

They took an active role supporting the invasions of North Africa, Sicily and Italy and in the Normandy assault and in the assaults on German-held ports of Western Europe. In June 1944 ninety-seven Empire merchant ships were involved in the cross-channel convoys that carried troops and supplies ready for the Normandy invasion. Empire landing craft were involved in the assault phase, and Empire coasters were involved in the beaching of supplies and in ferrying cargo from the larger merchant ships anchored off-shore.

The success of the Normandy invasion depended on the successful construction of the Mulberry ports. These were prefabricated ports, constructed at Southampton, Gosport, Portsmouth, Tilbury Docks, and even as far north as Birkenhead and Hartlepool. Two hundred tugs then took three months to tow the components of the harbours from where they were constructed to assembly areas on the South Coast. Between 7 June 1944 and the end of July, the tugs towed the materials across the channel to Normandy.

Before D-Day, sixty old merchant ships and four old warships were selected as blockships, to be scuttled in a line to give protection to the small craft. The blockships were stripped before setting out in convoy across the channel. Empire tugs were used to ensure the safe crossing. On reaching Normandy they were scuttled in five groups, codenamed Gooseberry 1 to Gooseberry 5. Gooseberry 4 at Juno Beach included four Empire ships: Empire Bunting, Empire Flamingo, Empire Moorhen and Empire Waterhen. Gooseberry 5 at Ouistreham included three Empire ships: Empire Defiance, Empire Tamar and Empire Tana. Between 19 and 23 June 1944 a severe gale, damaged many of the Mulberry harbours and wrecked some of the blockships. Additional blockships were added in July 1944, including one more Empire ship, Empire Bittern, and two of the former Empire ships that had been transferred to the Norwegians: Norfalk (formerly Empire Kittiwake) and Norjerv (formerly Empire Eagle).

=== Crew ===
Empire ships were armed. There were merchant seamen gunners. Also many British and Canadian merchantmen carried volunteer naval gunners called Defensively equipped merchant ship or DEMS gunners. The American ships carried Naval Armed Guard gunners. Merchant seamen crewed the merchant ships of the British Merchant Navy which kept the United Kingdom supplied with raw materials, arms, ammunition, fuel, food and all of the necessities of a nation at war throughout World War II literally enabling the country to defend itself. In doing this they sustained a considerably greater casualty rate than almost every branch of the armed services and suffered great hardship. Seamen were aged from fourteen through to their late seventies.

=== Postwar service ===
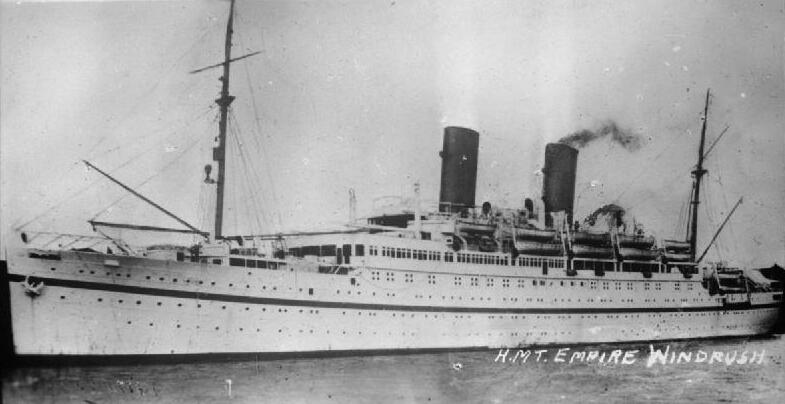
HMT Empire Windrush

At the end of the war, tankers were released from requisition as they completed voyages after 31 December 1945 and dry cargo ships after voyages completed after 2 March 1946. However, passenger and troopships were still involved in the repatriation of servicemen, prisoners of war and refugees. The government therefore converted several captured German passenger ships to Empire troop ships. These included Empire Fowey, Empire Halladale, Empire Ken, Empire Orwell, Empire Trooper and Empire Windrush.

Empire Comfort, Empire Lifeguard, Empire Peacemaker and Empire Shelter were smaller troopships operating in the Mediterranean Sea; Empire Parkeston and Empire Wansbeck operated as troopships between Harwich and the Hook of Holland.

== Losses and disposal of ships ==
In 1942, shipowners who had lost ships (either as a casualty of war or requisitioned by the Government) during the war, were able to buy ships built for the Government. Such ships were then managed by the shipowner on behalf of the Ministry of War Transport, until the end of the war. Tramps and colliers built before 1942 were sold on in this way, although some smaller ships remained unsold. Empire ships were also transferred to the representatives of governments of countries that had been invaded by Germany, in recognition of the losses suffered by the fleets of Britain's allies.

=== Ships transferred to other governments ===
Ten Empire ships and one Ocean type American tramp, Ocean Veteran, as well as a number of Liberty type ships were transferred to Belgium between the years 1941 and 1943.

- Transferred in 1941: Empire Lapwing
- Transferred in 1942: Empire Albatross, Empire Drayton, Empire Masefield, Empire Swan and Empire Selwyn.
- Transferred in 1943: Empire Ballantyne, Empire Centaur, Empire Claymore and Empire Launcelot

Twenty-nine Empire ships were transferred or built for the Netherlands and several American-built ships including Ocean Athlete, Ocean Merchant and Ocean Victory were also transferred.

- Transferred in 1942: Empire Boy, Empire Deep, Empire Halley, Empire Mavis, Empire Penguin, Empire Raleigh, Empire Rennie, Empire Robin and Empire Trust
- Transferred in 1943: Empire Courage, Empire Dyke, Empire Ford, Empire Fortune, Empire Galliard, Empire Hazlitt, Empire Iseult, Empire Reynard, Empire River, Empire Ruskin, Empire Sidney, Empire Sound, Empire Spray and Empire Toiler
- Transferred in 1944: Empire Kamal and Empire Fletcher
- Transferred in 1945: Empire Ribble
- Transferred in 1946: Empire Concrete, Empire Condee, Empire Convoy, Empire Lily

Twenty-four Empire ships were purchased by the French Government after liberation in 1945. All were transferred in 1945–46. Empire Gala and Empire Jupiter were later placed with the Gouvernement Generale de L'Indo-Chine, along with 10 Park-type Canadian-built ships.

- Empire Bute, Empire Cadet, Empire Call, Empire Crown, Empire Dorrit, Empire Driver, Empire Duke, Empire Falstaff, Empire Farmer, Empire Friendship, Empire Gala, Empire Gillian, Empire Jessica, Empire Jupiter, Empire Mull, Empire Outpost, Empire Rawlinson, Empire Sceptre, Empire Sedley, Empire Stronghold, Empire Symbol, Empire Traveller, Empire Unicorn and Empire Welfare

Nineteen Empire ships were transferred to the Norwegian Government in 1941–42.

- Empire Beaver, Empire Carey, Empire Diamond, Empire Druid, Empire Dunlin, Empire Eagle, Empire Elk, Empire Fairbairn, Empire Field, Empire Grenfell, Empire Kittiwake, Empire Latimer, Empire Onyx, Empire Pearl, Empire Penn, Empire Pict, Empire Pilgrim, Empire Ptarmigan and Empire Saxon.

More were transferred to the Norwegian Government in 1946.

- Empire Concave, Empire Concern, Empire Condover, Empire Congress, Empire Conleith, Empire Conningbeg, Empire Conqueror, Empire Constitution. Empire Ettrick.

Three Empire ships and a number of US ships were built or transferred to the Polish Government in 1942–43. One was built directly for Poland in 1942 as Bałtyk.

- Transferred in 1942: Empire Builder and Empire Roamer
- Transferred in 1943: Empire Hunter

A number of Empire ships were transferred to the Soviet Union during and after the war.

Transferred in 1944: Empire Nigel

Transferred in 1946: Empire Ayr, Empire Conclyde, Empire Concord, Empire Confederation, Empire Congleton, Empire Congreve, Empire Conisborough, Empire Conleven, Empire Connah, Empire Connaught, Empire Connemara, Empire Consett, Empire Constable^{†}, Empire Constellation, Empire Contees, Empire Contest, Empire Convention^{†}, Empire Conway, Empire Conwear, Empire Dart, Empire Dee, Empire Douglas^{†}, Empire Dovey^{†}, Empire Durant, Empire Forth^{†}, Empire Gable^{†}, Empire Gabon, Empire Gage, Empire Gala, Empire Galashiels, Empire Galaxy, Empire Galleon, Empire Gallic, Empire Galveston, Empire Gantry^{†}, Empire Garner, Empire Kennet, Empire Lea, Empire Neath, Empire Nidd, Empire Ock, Empire Orwell, Empire Tageland, Empire Tageos, Empire Tarne, Empire Tegaden, Empire Tegados, Empire Tegaica, Empire Tegalta, Empire Tegamas, Empire Tegleone, Empire Tegoria, Empire Teguda, Empire Teguto, Empire Teme, Empire Teviot, Empire Tigarth, Empire Tigbart, Empire Tigina, Empire Tigombo, Empire Tigonto, Empire Tigost, Empire Tigouver, Empire Venture, Empire Viking I, Empire Viking II, Empire Viking III, Empire Viking VI, Empire Viking VIII, Empire Viking IX, Empire Viking X, Empire Weaver, Empire Welland^{†}, Empire Wey, Empire Yare^{†}.

Transferred in 1947: Empire Cherwell

† denotes those ships transferred under the terms of the Potsdam Agreement.

=== War losses ===
One hundred and eighty two Empire ships were lost through enemy action, including to mines, submarines, enemy aircraft, E-boats and blockships. The first lost was Empire Commerce in 1940 and the last was Empire Gold in 1945. Eight Empire ships were sacrificed as blockships to support the Normandy invasion. Some of the blockships were later raised and scrapped.

A considerable number of the losses were sunk by U-boats in the Battle of the Atlantic and the fate of a number of these vessels, which had sailed and never arrived at their destinations, without sending any distress signals, was only discovered with the cessation of hostilities, and subsequent post-war research in German and Italian archives. Some U-boats responsible for particular ship sinkings were sunk before being able to report their successes.

- Empire Activity – wrecked on Peckford Reef while en route Botwood – UK, 3 October 1943
- Empire Adventure – torpedoed and sunk by U-boat while on passage Tyne – Wabana, NFL, 20 September 1940
- Empire Airman – torpedoed and sunk by U-boat about 350 miles W. of Malin Head while en route Wabana, NFL – Cardiff, 21 September 1940
- Empire Amethyst – lost without trace April 1942 about 150 miles S. of Haiti while en route New Orleans – Freetown – torpedoed and sunk by U-154 on 13 April 1942.
- Empire Arnold – torpedoed and sunk about 500 miles E. of Trinidad by U-boat, 4 August 1942
- Empire Attendant – torpedoed and sunk by U-boat off the West African coast, 15 July 1942
- Empire Banner – torpedoed by U-boat and later sunk by German aircraft off the North African coast, 7 February 1943
- Empire Barracuda – torpedoed and sunk by U-boat off Gibraltar, 15 December 1941
- Empire Beacon – struck a mine and sank off St. Ann's Head, Pembrokeshire, 5 April 1942.
- Empire Beaumont – torpedoed and sunk South of Spitsbergen by German aircraft on 13 September 1942.
- Empire Bell – torpedoed and sunk after passage from Loch Ewe to Reykjavík by U-442 on 25 September 1942.
- Empire Bison – torpedoed and sunk by U-boat in North Atlantic, 1 November 1940
- Empire Blanda – lost without trace on-route Halifax, NS, to Grangemouth, on or around 9 February 1941
- Empire Brigade – torpedoed and sunk by U-boat West of the Hebrides, 18 October 1940
- Empire Broadsword – struck mine off Normandy and sank, 2 July 1944
- Empire Buffalo – torpedoed and sunk by U-125 off Grand Cayman Island, BWI, 6 May 1942
- Empire Burton – CAM ship – torpedoed and sunk east of Cape Farewell by U-74 on 20 September 1941.
- Empire Byron – torpedoed and sunk by U-boat in Barents Sea 5 July 1942
- Empire Cloud – torpedoed by U-564 northeast of Trinidad on 19 August 1942 with the loss of three crew members. The Dutch tug Roode Zee took her in tow, but Empire Cloud sank on 21 August.
- Empire Clough – torpedoed by U-94 while en route from Loch Ewe to New York via Boston and abandoned on 10 June 1942
- Empire Comet – dropped out from convoy and disappeared on 9 February 1942 – presumed torpedoed by U-boat
- Empire Commerce – torpedoed and sunk by U-410 north west of Philippeville on 1 October 1943 – not same ship as ship of same name sunk in 1940
- Empire Conveyor – torpedoed and sunk by U-122 off Barra Head, 22 June 1940.
- Empire Corporal – torpedoed and sunk by U-boat off Cuba, 14 August 1942
- Empire Cowper – bombed and sunk by German aircraft while en route Murmansk – Iceland, 11 April 1942
- Empire Cromwell – torpedoed and sunk by U-508 off Trinidad, 28 November 1942
- Empire Crossbill – torpedoed and sunk by U-boat, 11 September 1941
- Empire Dabchick – torpedoed and sunk by U-boat about 200 miles S.E. of Sable Island, 3 December 1942
- Empire Dace – struck mine and sank at entrance to Missolonghi, Greece, 1 December 1944
- Empire Dawn – shelled and sunk by German surface raider SW of Cape Town, 12 September 1942
- Empire Day – CAM ship – torpedoed and sunk by U-198 some 200 nautical miles (370 km) east of Dar es Salaam, Tanganyika, 21 August 1944
- Empire Dell – torpedoed and sunk by U-boat in North Atlantic, 12 May 1942
- Empire Dew – torpedoed and sunk by U-boat in mid Atlantic, 12 June 1941
- Empire Drum - torpedoed and sunk by U-136 en route from New York to Alexandria via Cape Town while 280 nautical miles (520 km) south east of New York on 24 April 1942
- Empire Dryden – torpedoed and sunk by U-572 while en route to Alexandria via Table Bay at 240 nautical miles (440 km) north west of Bermuda, 20 April 1942
- Empire Dunstan – torpedoed and sunk by U-81 while in Ionian Sea off Taranto, bound for Brindisi, 18 November 1943.
- Empire Eland – lost without trace while sailing in ballast on voyage from Liverpool to Mobile and Tampa, 7 September 1941 (date of sailing) – later confirmed torpedoed and sunk by U-94 on 15 September 1941 while in mid-Atlantic
- Empire Endurance – torpedoed and sunk by U-73 south-east of the islet of Rockall, 20 April 1941
- Empire Energy – wrecked 11 miles west of Cape Norman, Belle Isle Strait, 4 November 1941
- Empire Engineer – lost without trace en route Sydney, Nova Scotia, to Newport, Montreal, 22 January 1941
- Empire Eve – torpedoed and sunk by U-414 off the Algerian Coast, 18 May 1943
- Empire Explorer – torpedoed, shelled, and sunk by U-boat between Demerara and Barbados, 8 July 1942
- Empire Frost – attacked by German aircraft off Lundy Island, 12 March taken in tow, sank after further air attacks, 13 March 1941
- Empire Fusilier – torpedoed and sunk by U-boat, 8 February 1942
- Empire Gem – torpedoed and sunk by U-boat off Cape Hatteras, 23 January 1942
- Empire Ghyll – struck mine and sank near Gunfleet, 18 October 1941
- Empire Gilbert – torpedoed and sunk by U-boat between Spitsbergen and Jan Mayen Island, 2 November 1942
- Empire Gold – torpedoed and sunk by U-boat off the Bay of Biscay, 18 April 1945
- Empire Guillemot – torpedoed and sunk by Italian aircraft off Bona, 24 October 1941
- Empire Hail – torpedoed and sunk while in convoy by U-boat in North Atlantic, 23 February 1942
- Empire Hawksbill – torpedoed and sunk by U-boat about 200 miles N. of The Azores, 19 July 1942
- Empire Heath – torpedoed and sunk by U-boat off Trinidad, 11 May 1944
- Empire Heritage – torpedoed and sunk by U-482 off Malin Head, 8 September 1944
- Empire Heron – torpedoed and sunk by U-boat in North Atlantic, 15 October 1941
- Empire Homer – blown ashore and wrecked on Sandray Island while in ballast en route Greenock to New York, 15 January 1942
- Empire Hope – attacked by Axis aircraft near Cape Son while in Malta Convoy as part of Operation Pedestal, set on fire, and later sunk by companion ships, on 13 August 1942
- Empire Howard – torpedoed and sunk by U-boat while in convoy to Russia, 16 April 1942
- Empire Hurst – bombed and sunk by German aircraft 400 miles W. of Gibraltar, 11 August 1941
- Empire Impala – lost without trace while sailing en route New York – Hull, 23 February 1943 (date of sailing)
- Empire Jaguar – torpedoed and sunk by U-boat in North Atlantic, 8 December 1940
- Empire Javelin – torpedoed and sunk by U-boat 40 miles S. of St. Catherine's Point, 28 December 1944
- Empire Kestrel – attacked by Axis aircraft and sunk by torpedo off North African Coast, 16 August 1943
- Empire Kingsley – torpedoed and sunk by U-boat off Falmouth, 22 March 1945
- Empire Kohinoor – torpedoed and sunk by U-boat about 150 miles S.W. of Monrovia, 2 July 1943
- Empire Lake – torpedoed and sunk by U-181 off East coast of Madagascar, 15 July 1943
- Empire Lakeland – strayed from convoy while en route New York – Glasgow and never seen again – presumed sunk by U-boat, 11 March 1943 (date of last sighting)
- Empire Lancer – torpedoed and sunk by U-boat in Mozambique Channel, 16 August 1944
- Empire Lawrence – bombed and sunk by German aircraft off the North Cape while en-route Reykjavík to Murmansk, 27 May 1942
- Empire Leopard – torpedoed and sunk by U-boat about 500 miles E. of Belle Isle, 2 November 1942
- Empire Light – sunk by German raider German auxiliary cruiser Pinguin N. of the Seychelles on 25 April 1941
- Empire Lytton – torpedoed and sunk by U-boat about 500 miles E. of The Canary Islands, 9 January 1943
- Empire Mahseer – torpedoed and sunk by U-boat about 100 miles out from Durban, 3 March 1943
- Empire Mallard – sunk in collision with Empire Moon near Point Armour, Belle Isle Strait, 26 September 1941
- Empire March – sunk by enemy surface raider off Tristan de Cunha, 2 January 1943
- Empire Merchant – torpedoed and sunk by U-boat off West coast of Ireland, 16 August 1940
- Empire Merlin – torpedoed and sunk by U-boat about 250 miles N.W. of the Hebrides, 25 August 1940
- Empire Mermaid – bombed by German aircraft off N.W. coast of Scotland, sinking two days later, 26 March 1941
- Empire Mersey – torpedoed and sunk by U-boat in North Atlantic, 14 October 1942. Empire Mersey had formerly been the Ramon de Larringa
- Empire Metal – bombed and sunk by German aircraft while in Bona harbour, Algeria, 2 January 1943
- Empire Mica – torpedoed and sunk by U-boat off West coast of Florida while en route Houston – UK, 29 June 1942
- Empire Mordred – mined and sunk off Ceuta, 7 February 1942
- Empire Moonbeam – torpedoed and damaged by U-211, and later sunk by U-601, while in ballast en route Glasgow – New York – Norfolk, Virginia, 11–12 September 1942
- Empire Newcomen – torpedoed and sunk by S-boat 5 miles S. of Dudgeon Light, 30 November 1941
- Empire Nomad – torpedoed and sunk by U-boat about 105 miles out from Durban bound for Trinidad, 13 October 1942
- Empire Panther – struck a mine and sank off Strumble Head, 1 January 1943
- Empire Prairie – disappeared after sailing from Halifax en route to Table Bay and Alexandria, 7 April 1942 (date of sailing). Subsequently, confirmed as having been torpedoed and sunk by U-654, about 300 miles NE of Bermuda, on 10 April 1942
- Empire Progress – torpedoed and sunk by U-boat about 200 miles N.W of the Azores while en route Glasgow – Tampa, 13 April 1942
- Empire Protector – torpedoed and sunk by U-boat near Cape Palmas while on passage from Cape Town to Freetown, 30 May 1941
- Empire Purcell – bombed and sunk by German aircraft off the North Cape while en route from Middlesbrough to North Russia via Reykjavík, 27 May 1942
- Empire Ridge – torpedoed and sunk by U-boat while on passage from Melilla to Garston, 19 May 1941
- Empire Rosebery – struck a mine and sank two miles N. of Arromanches, 24 August 1944
- Empire Sailor – torpedoed and sunk by U-boat while about 300 miles E. of Halifax, NS, 21 November 1942
- Empire Shackleton – torpedoed and sunk by U-boat while in convoy from Liverpool to Halifax, NS, 28 December 1942
- Empire Sky – torpedoed and sunk by U-boat about 300 miles W. of the North Cape while on passage from Hull via Reykjavík to Archangel, 6 November 1942
- Empire Soldier – sunk due to collision with the F. J. Wolfe while en route from New York to Halifax, NS, and Hull, 16 September 1942
- Empire Song – sunk due to explosion of cargo of munitions while off Malta, 9 May 1941
- Empire Spring – disappeared after convoy dispersed and never seen again, 15 February 1942 (date of last sighting)
- Empire Springbuck – torpedoed and sunk by U-boat in North Atlantic while out from Sydney, NS., bound for Leith and London, 10 September 1941
- Empire Stanley – torpedoed and sunk by U-boat about 200 miles S.E. of Madagascar, 17 August 1943
- Empire Star – torpedoed and sunk by U-boat in North Atlantic, 23 October 1942
- Empire Statesman – disappeared on a voyage from Freetown to Middlesbrough via Oban after reporting engine trouble on the 21st, 19 November 1940 (date of sailing)
- Empire Steel – torpedoed and sunk by U-boat in North Atlantic, 24 March 1942
- Empire Stevenson – torpedoed by German aircraft and blew up while on passage from Hull to Russia via North Cape, 13 September 1942
- Empire Stream – torpedoed and sunk by U-boat about 800 miles W. of Cape Finisterre, 25 September 1941
- Empire Sun – torpedoed and sunk by U-boat about 150 miles S. of Halifax, NS, while en route from Portland, Maine to UK, 7 February 1942
- Empire Surf – torpedoed and sunk by U-boat about 600 miles E. of the Orkney Islands, 14 January 1942
- Empire Thunder – torpedoed and sunk by U-boat off Stornoway, 6 January 1941
- Empire Tiger – lost in storm en route from Philadelphia and Halifax, NS, bound for the Clyde, distress call received 27 February 1941
- Empire Tower – torpedoed and sunk by U-boat about 250 miles W. of Cape Finisterre, 5 March 1943
- Empire Turnstone – torpedoed and sunk by U-boat in the North Atlantic, 22 October 1942
- Empire Union – torpedoed and sunk by U-boat in North Atlantic while en route London to Saint John, NB, 26 December 1942
- Empire Volunteer – torpedoed and sunk by U-boat about 250 miles W. of the Hebrides, 15 September 1940
- Empire Wagtail – torpedoed and sunk by U-boat about 900 miles E. of Cape Finisterre, 28 December 1942
- Empire Wave – torpedoed and sunk by U-boat about 500 miles E. of Cape Farewell, 2 October 1941
- Empire Whale – torpedoed and sunk by U-boat while in convoy in Bay of Biscay, 29 March 1943
- Empire Wildebeeste – torpedoed and sunk by U-boat while on passage from Hull to Baltimore when about 600 miles W. of Philadelphia, 24 January 1942.

=== Post-war disposal ===
In 1946 numerous British-built Empire ships, as well as ex-German prize ships were offered for sale or for three- or five-year charter.

== Survivors ==
At least three Empire ships survive today:

1. Empire Sandy, built as a tug, has been converted to a schooner and is active on the Great Lakes.
2. ST Cervia, a tug built as Empire Raymond, is preserved as a museum ship at Ramsgate, Kent.
3. The 2,471 GRT former Empire Forth, a cargo ship built in Germany in 1939 as Mars, was renamed Vityaz and is preserved at Kaliningrad, Russia.

The tug Laut Sawu (ex-Empire Humphrey) was still in active service in Indonesia in 2004. The tug Poetto (ex-Empire Stella) was still in service in Italy in 2004.

Of the numerous Empire ships that have been wrecked over the years, at least two have become features on tourist beaches. The 7,055 GRT former Empire Trumpet, latterly Khoula F, has been beached on the coast of Kish Island on the Persian Gulf since 1966. She is a sight popular with Iranian tourists, particularly at sunset. The 7,355 GRT former Blue Star Line ship Empire Strength, latterly E Evangelia, has been beached at Costinești, Romania, since 1968.

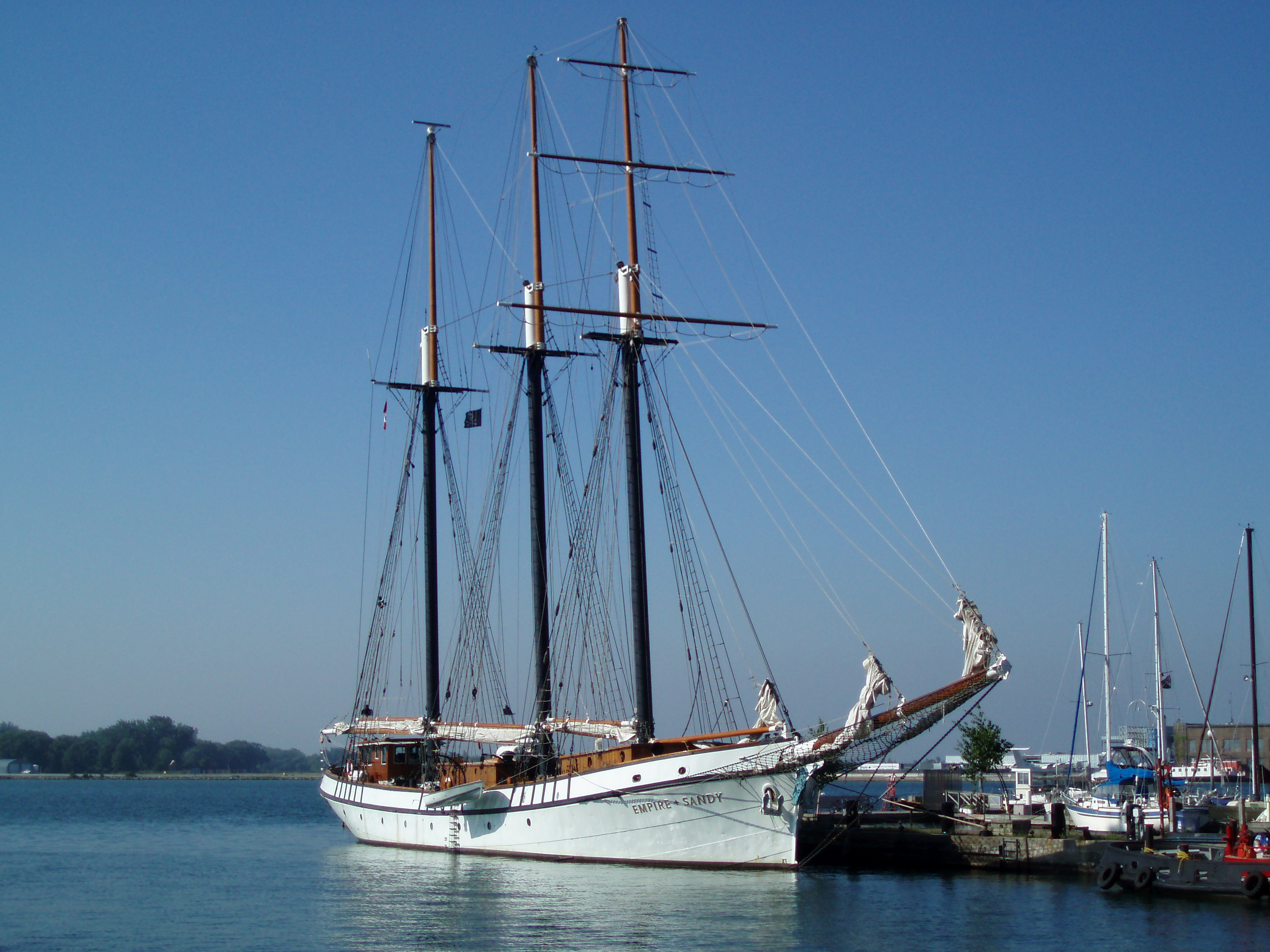
Empire Sandy

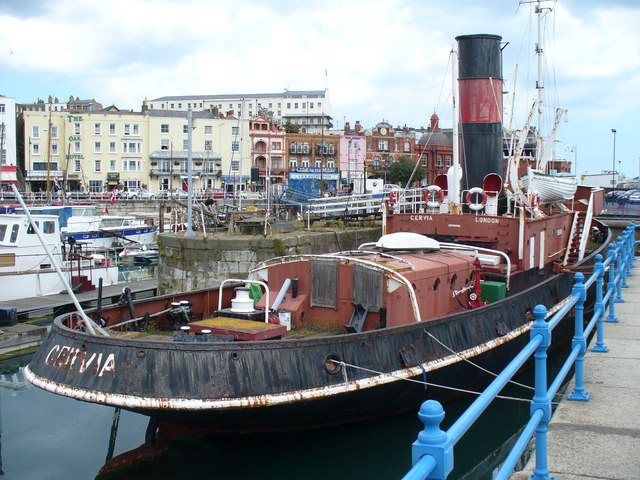
ST Cervia, ex–Empire Raymond

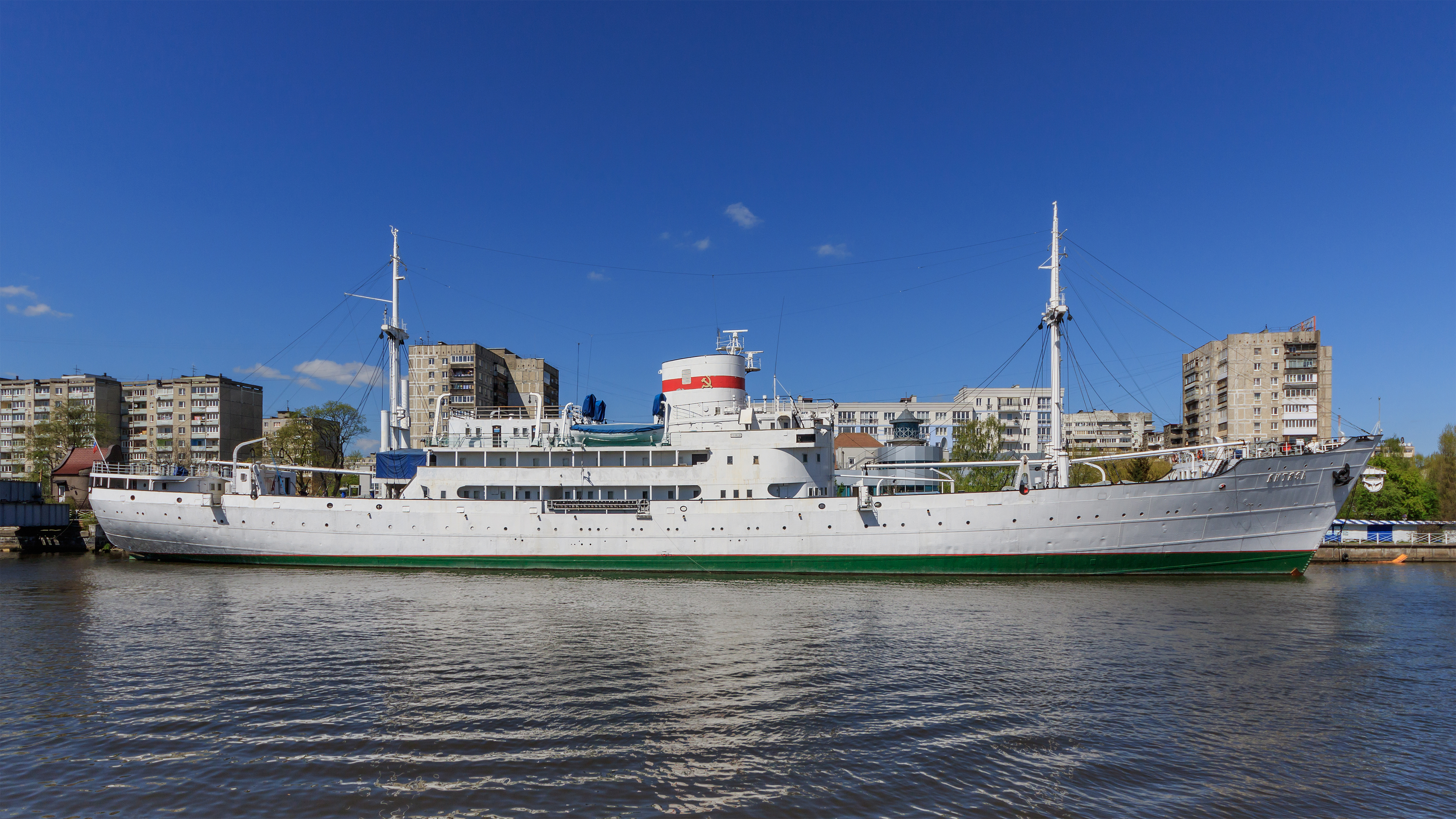
Vityaz, ex–Empire Forth

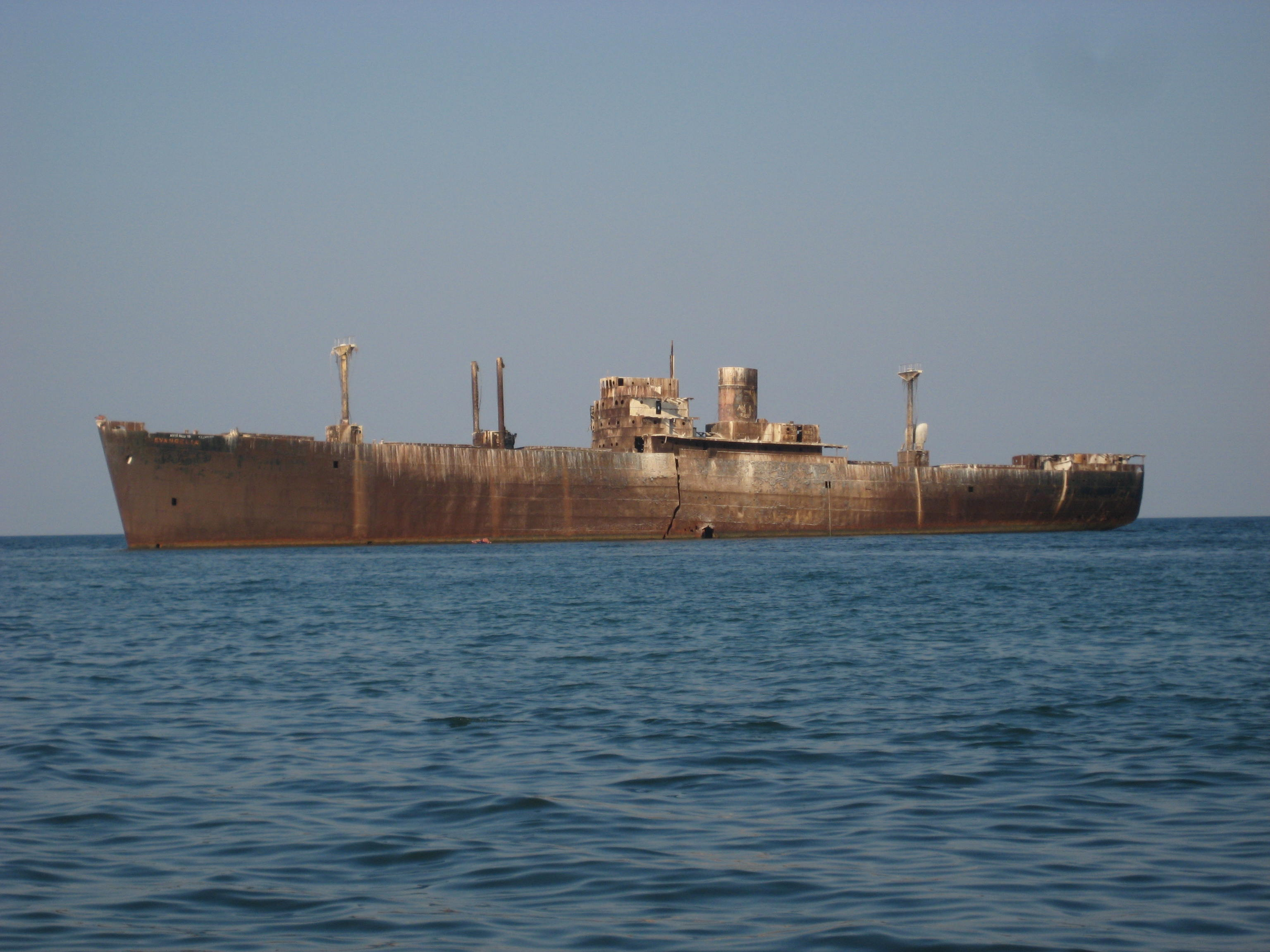
E Evangelia, ex–Empire Strength

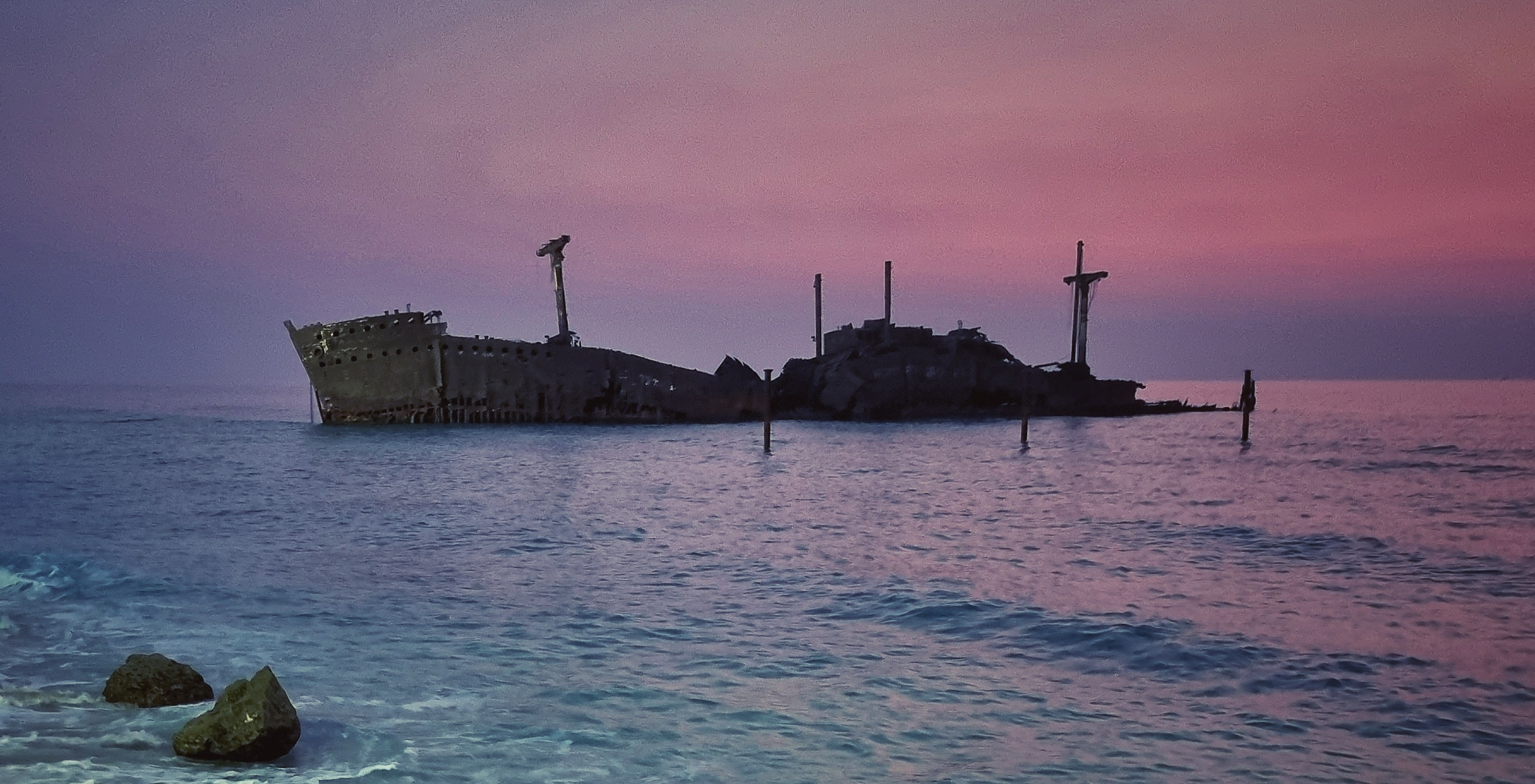
Khoula F, ex–Empire Trumpet

== See also ==
- Liberty ship
- List of Empire ships
- List of ship classes of World War II
- List of ships of World War II
- Park ships
- Victory ship

== Bibliography ==
- Dear, Ian (2016). The Tattie Lads: The Untold Story of the Rescue Tug Service in both World Wars and its Battle to Save ships, lives and cargoes. London: Conway (Bloomsbury Publishing). ISBN 978-1-84-486401-0.
- Hocking, Charles (1994). Dictionary of Disasters At Sea during the Age of Steam, including Sailing Ships and Ships of War lost in Action, 1824−1962 (3rd ed.). Uckfield: Naval & Military Press. ISBN 978-0-94-813068-7.
- Miciński, Jerzy; Huras, Bohdan; Twardowski, Marek (1999). Księga statków polskich 1918–1945. Tom 3 [A book of Polish ships 1918−1945] (in Polish). Vol. III. Gdańsk: Polnord Wydawnictwo Oskar. ISBN 83-86181-45-1.
- Mitchell, W. H.; Sawyer, L. A. (1965). Empire Ships of World War II. Liverpool, UK: Sea Breezes. OCLC 9432681.
- Mitchell, William Harry; Sawyer, Leonard Arthur (1990). The Empire Ships (2nd ed.). London, New York, Hamburg, Hong Kong: Lloyd's of London Press Ltd. ISBN 1-85044-275-4.
