= SS Empire Gala =

Two steamships were named Empire Gala:

- SS Empire Gala (1944), a Hansa A Type cargo ship in service 1945-46
- SS Empire Gala (1946), a Park ship launched as Empire Gala but completed as Bir Hakeim
