= Empire class =

Empire class may refer to:

- Empire ship, an Empire-class merchant ship used during World War II by the British Government
- Merchant aircraft carrier, an Empire-class merchant ship adapted to both carry grain and carry a limited complement of aircraft for convoy patrol duty
