= SS Empire Curlew =

Two Empire ships were named Empire Curlew:

- SS Empire Curlew (1940), a Type C2-S cargo ship in service 1941–42
- SS Empire Curlew (1945), a converted LST in service 1956–62
