= Greek Ship =

Cargo ship beached on Kish Island, Iran, since 1966

Coordinates: 26°31′34.13″N 53°54′29.11″E

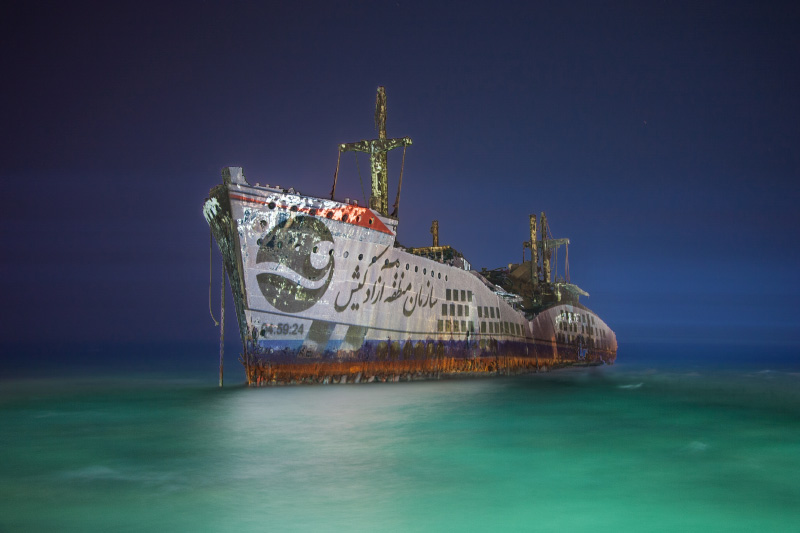
- Khoula F, the "Greek Ship", on Kish Island

History
- Name: Empire Trumpet (1943–1946); Naturalist (1946–1959); Persian Cyrus (1959–1965); Hamadan (1965–1966); Koula F (1966)
- Owner: Ministry of War Transport, London (1943–1946); Charente Steamship Co. Ltd., Liverpool (1946–1959); Iranian Lloyd, Kerman bay (1959–1965); Iranian Shipping Lines SA, Khorramshahr (1965–1966); P. Frangoulis & A.I Cliafas, Piraeus (1966)
- Operator: T&J Harrison (1943–1959) B Ashworth (Overseas) Ltd (1959–65)
- Port of registry: (United Kingdom) Greenock
- Builder: William Hamilton & Co., Port Glasgow
- Yard number: 458
- Launched: 9 March 1943
- Completed: April 1943
- In service: 1943
- Out of service: 1966
- Identification: (as Empire Trumpet); UK Official Number 168995; signal code BFGT
- Nickname(s): "The Greek Ship"
- Fate: beached 25 July 1966

General characteristics
- Type: Cargo ship
- Tonnage: 7,059 GRT; 6,601 tonnage under deck; 4,805 NRT
- Length: 432.7 ft (131.9 m)
- Beam: 56.2 ft (17.1 m)
- Draught: 34.2 ft (10.4 m)
- Installed power: 510 NHP
- Propulsion: 3-cylinder triple-expansion steam engine
- Sensors & processing systems: direction finding; echo sounding

The Greek Ship (Persian: کشتی یونانی, romanized: Kešti-ye Yunāni) is the nickname of a cargo steamship, Khoula F, that has been beached on the southwest coast of Kish Island, Iran, since 1966. She was built in 1943 by the British shipyard of William Hamilton and Company in Port Glasgow, Scotland, under the name Empire Trumpet. From 1946 to 1966, she passed through a series of British and Iranian owners and various changes of name. Her final owners were Greek.

== Propulsion ==
Empire Trumpet was steam powered. She had nine corrugated furnaces with a combined grate area of 165 square feet (15 m^{2}) that heated three 220 lb_{f}/in^{2} single-ended boilers with a combined heating surface of 7,248 square feet (673 m^{2}). The boilers supplied a triple-expansion engine, which had cylinders of 24.5 inches (62 cm), 39 inches (99 cm) and 72 inches (180 cm) bore by 48 inches (120 cm) stroke, and was rated at 510 NHP. The engine was built by David Rowan & Co Ltd of Glasgow.

== Career ==
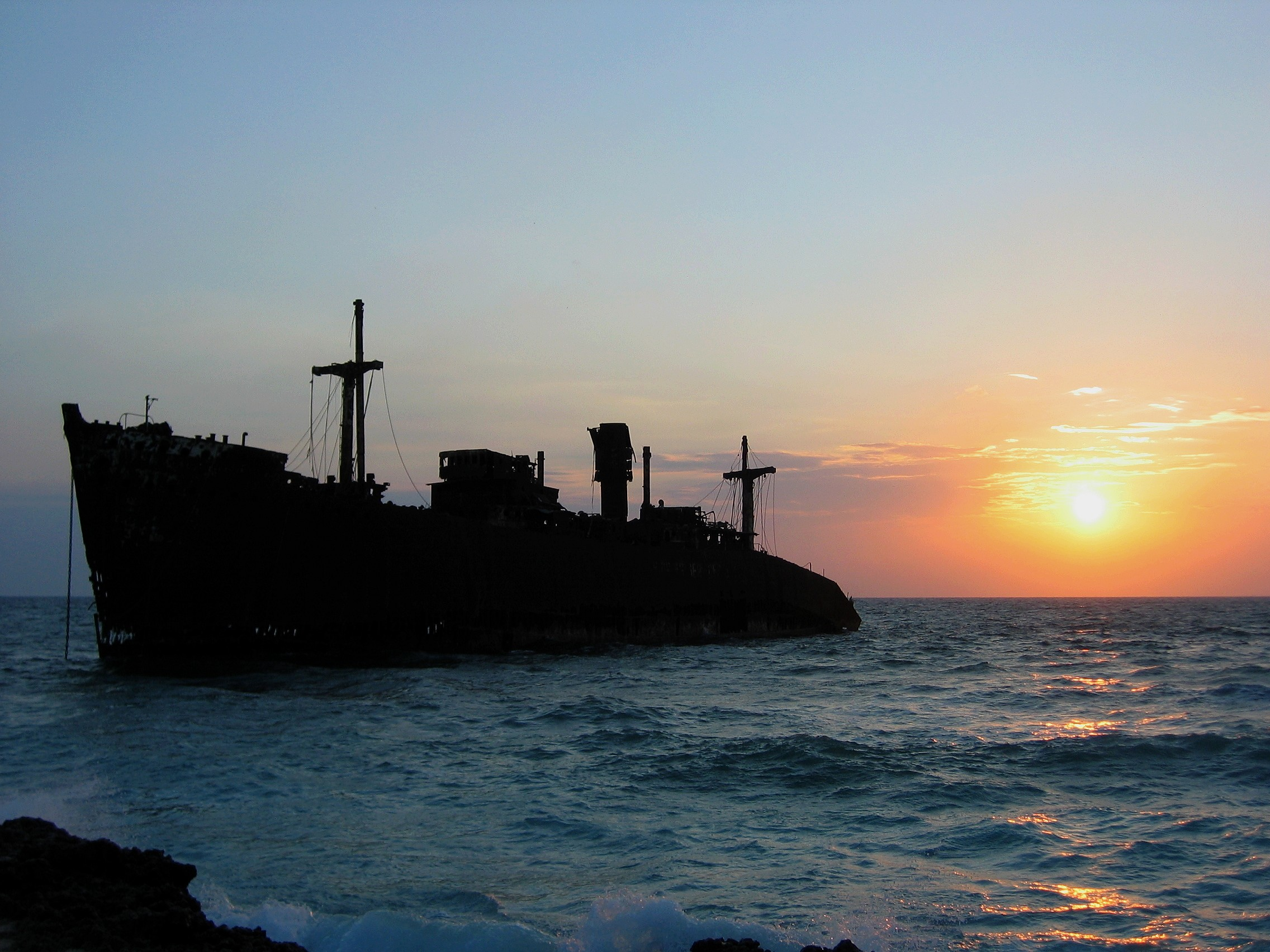
Khoula F, the "Greek Ship", on Kish Island

Empire Trumpet's first owner was the British Ministry of War Transport, which placed her under the management of Larrinaga Steam Ship Co from 1943 and then T&J Harrison Co from 1945. She was chartered to the South African Government from 1943 to 1946. In 1946, Charente Steam Ship Co bought the ship, renamed her Naturalist, and continued the management arrangement with T&J Harrison.

In 1959, Iranian Lloyd & Co Ltd of Khorramshahr bought the ship and renamed her Persian Cyrus. Iranian Lloyd placed Persian Cyrus under the management of B Ashworth and Co. (Overseas) Ltd of London. In 1965, Iranian Shipping Lines SA of Khorramshahr bought the ship and renamed her Hamadan. In 1966, P.J. Frangoulis and A.I. Cliafas of Greece bought the ship and renamed her Koula F.

== Wreck ==
Approximate position of Kish Island and Koula F's wreck in the Persian Gulf.

On 25 July 1966, Koula F ran aground on the south-western coast of Kish Island in the Persian Gulf. The Dutch salvage tug Orinoco tried to refloat the ship but was unsuccessful. The insurers declared Khoula F a total loss and she has remained beached ever since. The ship's condition has deteriorated and her stern has started to break up. The ship attracts tourists who come to view her at sunset.
