= SS Elbe (1921) =

1921 ship

History
- Name: Elbe (1921-45); Empire Confederation (1945-46); José Dias (1946-66)
- Owner: Bugsier Reederei & Bergungs AG (1921-45); Ministry of War Transport (1945); Ministry of Transport (1945-46); Russian Government (1946-66)
- Operator: Bugsier Reederei & Bergungs AG (1921-45); Buchan & Hogg Ltd (1945-46); Russian Government (1946-66)
- Port of registry: (Weimar Republic) Hamburg (1921-33); (Nazi Germany) Hamburg (1933-45); (United Kingdom) London (1945-46); Soviet Union (1946-66)
- Builder: Nobiskrug Werft GmbH
- Launched: 1921
- Identification: Code Letters RBVM (1912-34); Code Letters DHGB (1934-45); Code Letters GKRD (1945-46); United Kingdom Official Number 180614 (1945-46)
- Fate: Scrapped

General characteristics
- Type: Cargo ship
- Tonnage: 1,197 GRT (1921-45); 1,199 GRT (1945-66); 641 NRT (1921-45); 642 NRT (1945-66)
- Length: 250 ft 0 in (76.20 m)
- Beam: 37 ft 5 in (11.40 m)
- Depth: 12 ft 8 in (3.86 m)
- Installed power: Triple expansion steam engine
- Propulsion: Screw propeller

Elbe was a 1,197 GRT cargo ship that was built in 1921 by Nobiskrug Werft, Rendsburg for German owners. She was seized by the Allies at Copenhagen, Denmark in May 1945, passed to the Ministry of War Transport (MoWT) and renamed Empire Confederation. In 1946, she was transferred to the Soviet Union and renamed José Dias (Хозе Диас). She served until she was scrapped in 1966.

== Description ==
The ship was built in 1912 by Nobiskrug Werft GmbH, Rendsburg.

The ship was 250 feet 0 inches (76.20 m) long, with a beam of 37 feet 5 inches (11.40 m) a depth of 12 feet 8 inches (3.86 m). She had a GRT of 1,197 and a NRT of 641.

The ship was propelled by a triple expansion steam engine, which had cylinders of 17 7/10 inches (45 cm), 28 1/2 inches (72 cm) and 47 3/10 inches (120 cm) diameter by 31 1/2 inches (80 cm). The engine was built by Ottensener Maschinenfabrik GmbH, Altona.

== History ==
Elbe was built for Bugsier Reederei & Bergungs AG, Hamburg. Her port of registry was Hamburg and the Code Letters RBVM were allocated. In 1934, her Code Letters were changed to DHGB.

In May 1945, Elbe was seized by the Allies at Copenhagen, Denmark. She was passed to the MoWT and renamed Empire Confederation. Her port of registry was changed to London The Code Letters GKRD and United Kingdom Official Number 180614 were allocated. She was operated under the management of Buchan & Hogg Ltd. Empire Confederation was assessed as 1,199 GRT, 642 NRT. In 1946, she was allocated to the Soviet Union and renamed José Dias. She was scrapped in 1966.
