= SS Belocean =

Heavy lift ship

History
- Name: SS Empire Canute (1945–47); SS Belocean (1947–54); MV Belocean (1954–64); MV Southern Star (1964–68); MV Marie Ann (1968–76)
- Owner: Ministry of War Transport (1945); Ministry of Transport (1945–47); Belships Co Ltd (1947–64); Bacong Shipping Co SA (1964–68); Manila Interocean Lines Inc (1968–76)
- Operator: Christen Smith & Co Ltd (1947–64); Southern Industrial Products Ltd (1964–68); Manila Interocean Lines Inc (1968–76)
- Port of registry: (United Kingdom) Greenock (1945–47); (Norway) Oslo (1947–64); Panama City (1964–68); (Philippines) Manila (1968–76)
- Builder: Greenock Dockyard Co Ltd
- Yard number: 462
- Launched: 24 December 1945
- Completed: June 1947
- Identification: Code Letters GKKK (1945-47); Code Letters LMKX (1947-64); IMO number: 5040093
- Fate: Scrapped 1976.

General characteristics
- Tonnage: 7,750 GRT; 4,475 NRT; 9,830 DWT
- Length: 451 ft 0 in (137.46 m)
- Beam: 66 ft 7 in (20.29 m)
- Depth: 31 ft 0 in (9.45 m)
- Installed power: 1 × steam turbine (1945–54); 1 × diesel engine (1964–76)
- Propulsion: Screw propeller
- Speed: 15 knots (28 km/h)

Belocean was a 7,750 GRT heavy lift ship which was built in 1945 for the Ministry of War Transport (MoWT) as Empire Canute. She was completed in 1947 as Belocean for Belships Co Ltd. In 1964 she was sold to Bacong Shipping Co SA, Panama, and renamed Southern Star. In 1968, she was sold to Manila Interocean Lines Inc, Philippines, and renamed Marie Ann, serving until she was scrapped in July 1976.

== Description ==
The ship was built by Greenock Dockyard Co Ltd, Greenock as yard number 462. She was launched on 24 December 1945 and completed in June 1947.

The ship was 451 feet 0 inches (137.46 m) long, with a beam of 66 feet 7 inches (20.29 m)} and a depth of 31 feet 0 inches (9.45 m). Her GRT was 7,750, a NRT of 4,475, and a DWT of 9,970.

She was propelled steam turbine driving an electric motor and a screw shaft. The turbine was built by the General Electric Company Ltd, Erith. In 1954, Belocean was fitted with a new 8-cylinder 2T EV MAN diesel engine. She was capable of 15 knots (28 km/h).

== History ==
Empire Canute was built for the MoWT. She is recorded in Lloyd's Register for 1945–46 as being owned by then MoWT and The Clan Line Steamers Ltd, with management being by Cayzer, Irvine & Co Ltd. The Code Letters GKKK were allocated.

In June 1947, she was completed as Belocean for Belships Co Ltd. She was placed under the management of Christen Smith & Co Ltd, Oslo, Norway. The Code Letters LMKX were allocated and her port of registry was Oslo. She was sold in February 1964 to Bacong Shipping Co SA, Panama, and renamed Southern Star. She was operated under the management of Southern Industrial Products Inc. Manila, Philippines. In 1968, she was sold to Manila Interocean Lines Inc, Manila and renamed Marie Ann. She served until 1976, arriving on 29 July at Gadani Beach, Pakistan for scrapping.
