= SS Charlotte Cords =

German cargo ship

History
- Name: Charlotte Cords (1923–45); Empire Connah (1945–46); Nikolai Baumann (1946–64)
- Owner: Dampfschiff Gesellschaft August Cords GmbH (1923–45); Ministry of War Transport (1945); Ministry of Transport (1945–46); Soviet Government (1946–64)
- Operator: Dampfschiff Gesellschaft August Cords GmbH (1923–45); J T Duncan & Co Ltd (1945–46); Northern Sea Shipping Company (1946–61); Murmansk Shipping Company (1961–64)
- Port of registry: (Weimar Republic) Rostock (1923–33); (Nazi Germany) Rostock (1933–45); (United Kingdom) London (1945–46); (Soviet Union) Archangelsk (1946–61); (Soviet Union) Murmansk (1961–64)
- Builder: Neptun AG
- Launched: 1923
- Identification: Code Letters MFLN (1923–34); Code Letters DMAE (1934–45); Code Letters GMZB (1945–46); United Kingdom Official Number 180728 (1945–46)
- Fate: Scuttled in 1964

General characteristics
- Type: Cargo ship
- Tonnage: 1,779 GRT; 1,049 NRT
- Length: 266 ft 3 in (81.15 m)
- Beam: 40 ft 2 in (12.24 m)
- Depth: 16 ft 9 in (5.11 m)
- Installed power: Triple expansion steam engine
- Propulsion: Screw propeller

Charlotte Cords was a cargo ship that was built in 1923 by Neptun AG, Rostock for German owners. She was seized by the Allies in Travemünde in May 1945, passed to the Ministry of War Transport (MoWT) and renamed Empire Connah. In 1946, she was allocated to the Soviet Government and renamed Nikolai Bauman (Николай Бауман). The ship was scuttled while carrying a cargo of nuclear waste in 1964.

== Description ==
The ship was built in 1923 by Neptun AG, Rostock.

The ship was 266 feet 3 inches (81.15 m) long, with a beam of 40 feet 2 inches (12.24 m). She had a depth of 16 feet 9 inches (5.11 m). The ship had a GRT of 1,779 and a NRT of 1,049.

The ship was propelled by a triple expansion steam engine, which had cylinders of 19 5/16 inches (49.1 cm), 31 1/2 inches (80 cm) and 51 3/16 inches (130.0 cm) diameter by 35 inches (89 cm) stroke. The engine was built by Neptun.

== History ==
Charlotte Cords was built for Dampfschiff Gesellschaft August Cords GmbH, Rostock. Her port of registry was Rostock and the Code Letters MFLN were allocated. On 25 July 1934, she was involved in a collision with the British cargo ship Pear Branch in the North Sea off Grimsby, Lincolnshire, United Kingdom. In 1934, her Code letters were changed to DMAE. On 21 March 1941, Charlotte Cords was reported as preparing to depart from Rotterdam, Netherlands for Germany. HMS Snapper and HMS Sunfish were ordered to intercept her but failed to do so.

Charlotte Cords was seized by the Allies in May 1945 at Travemünde. She was passed to the MoWT and renamed Empire Connah. Her port of registry was changed to London. The Code Letters GMZB and United Kingdom Official Number 180692 were allocated. In 1946, Empire Connah was allocated to the Soviet Government and was renamed Nikolai Bauman (Николай Бауман). She was operated by the Northern Sea Shipping Company (Северное Морское Пароходство), Arkhangelsk.

On 5 November 1957, Nikolai Bauman was involved in a collision with the Dutch coaster Corale just off the coast at Vlissingen Netherlands, which led to the latter ship sinking. All eleven crew were rescued from Corale and taken to Vlissingen to recover. Nikolai Bauman was on a voyage from Arkhangelsk to Rotterdam. Corale was on a voyage from Antwerp, Belgium to Wismar, East Germany . At the time of the collision, she was being escorted by the Vlissingen pilot boat. A third ship, the 10,220 GRT Dongedijk of the Nederlandsch-Amerikaansche Stoomvaart Maatschappij, had obscured Corale from Nikolai Bauman. There was no chance for either ship to avoid the collision.

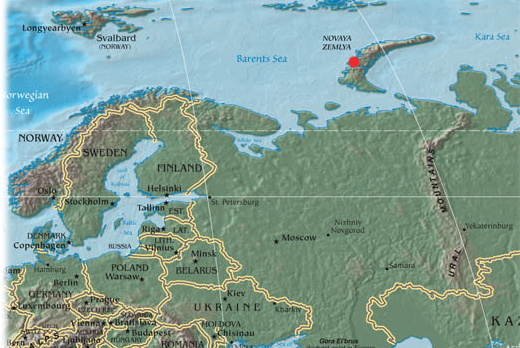
Location of archipelago where ship was scuttled in relation to northern Europe.

Nikolai Bauman anchored off Vlissingen following the collision. It was requested that she be held there until bail of ƒ1,750,000 was posted. Two officials tried to board Nikolai Bauman on 6 November, but Captain Pavel Mironiv refused to allow this, claiming that he was not responsible for the collision, and that it was a matter for the Soviet Government. He refused to be bound by any decision of the Dutch authorities and demanded access to the Soviet Embassy. It was not until that evening that negotiations were concluded and Nikolai Bauman was allowed to continue her voyage to Rotterdam after a much reduced bail had been posted. In 1961, Nikolai Bauman was transferred to the Murmansk Shipping Company (Му́рманское Морское Пароходство), Murmansk. She was scuttled in 1964 with a cargo of nuclear waste in Tsivolki Bay, Novaya Zemlya.
