= MV Empire Beacon =

World War II merchant ship of the United Kingdom

History
- Name: Empire Beacon
- Owner: Ministry of War Transport
- Operator: John Stewart & Co (Shipping) Ltd
- Port of registry: (United Kingdom) Glasgow
- Builder: Scott & Sons Ltd, Bowling
- Launched: 24 September 1941
- Completed: February 1942
- Identification: UK Official Number 168695; Code Letters BCSY
- Fate: Struck a mine and sank, 5 April 1942

General characteristics
- Tonnage: 872 GRT
- Length: 203 ft (61.87 m)
- Beam: 33 ft 2 in (10.11 m)
- Depth: 11 ft 7 in (3.53 m)
- Propulsion: 6-cylinder SCSA Oil engine, 80 hp (60 kW)

Location of the sinking of Empire Beacon.

Empire Beacon was an 872 GRT coaster which was built in 1941. She was owned by the Ministry of War Transport (MoWT) and managed by John Stewart & Co (Shipping) Ltd. Empire Beacon struck a mine and sank off St. Ann's Head, Pembrokeshire on 5 April 1942.

== Career ==
Empire Beacon was built by Scott & Sons Ltd, Bowling, West Dunbartonshire. She was yard number 358 and was launched on 24 September 1941 and completed in November that year. Empire Beacon was built for the MoWT and placed under the management of John Stewart & Co (Shipping) Ltd. Her port of registry was Glasgow.

== Sinking ==
On 5 April 1942, Empire Beacon struck a mine and sank 6 nautical miles (11 km) off St. Ann's Head (51°41′N 5°10′W).

== Official Numbers and Code Letters ==
Official numbers were a forerunner to IMO Numbers. Empire Beacon had the UK Official Number 168695 and used the Code Letters BCSY.

== Propulsion ==
Empire Beacon was powered by a Single Cycle, Single Action oil engine, driving a single screw. The cylinders were 13 3/8 in (340mm) diameter by 22 7/16 in (570 mm) stroke. The engine developed 80 horsepower (60 kW).
