= SS Empire Gull =

SS Empire Gull may refer to:

- SS Empire Gull (1919), former 6,458 GRT steamship Brave Coeur, taken into service under the Ministry of War Transport in 1941 and lost in 1942
- SS Empire Gull (1945), former LST Empire Gull (L3513), taken into service in 1956; entered service with the Royal Fleet Auxiliary in 1970 and scrapped in 1980.
