= SS Holdernith =

History
- Name: Empire Dorrit (1944–45); Lieutenant Lancelot (1945–54); Holdernith (1954–63)
- Owner: Ministry of War Transport (1944–45); French government (1945–54); Holderness Steamship Co Ltd (1954–63)
- Operator: William Robertson Ltd (1944–45); Société Navale Caennaise SA (1945–54); T Kittlewell & Son Ltd (1954–63)
- Port of registry: Glasgow, United Kingdom (1944–45); France (1945–1954); United Kingdom (1954–63)
- Builder: Scott & Sons Ltd
- Yard number: 372
- Launched: 4 October 1944
- Completed: December 1944
- Identification: United Kingdom Official Number 169422 (1944–45, 1954–63); Code Letters MMRY (1944–45)
- Fate: Sank after a collision

General characteristics
- Class & type: Coaster
- Tonnage: 965 GRT (1944–54); 643 GRT (1954–63); 536 NRT (1944–54); 263 (1954–63)
- Length: 205 ft (62 m)
- Beam: 34 ft (10 m)
- Propulsion: Triple expansion steam engine
- Speed: 9.5 knots (17.6 km/h)

Holdernith was a 643 GRT coaster vessel that was built in 1944 as Empire Dorrit by Scott and Son Ltd, Bowling, West Dunbartonshire, Scotland, UK, for the Ministry of War Transport (MoWT). She was transferred to the French government in 1945 and renamed Lieutenant Lancelot, serving until 1954 when she was sold to a British company and renamed Holdernith. She continued serving until 1963, when she was scrapped.

== Description ==
The ship was built in 1944 by Scott and Son Ltd, Bowling, West Dunbartonshire. She was yard number 372.

The ship was 205 feet (62 m) long, with a beam of 46 feet (14 m). As built, she was assessed at 965 GRT, 263 NRT.

The ship was propelled by a triple expansion steam engine. The engine was built by Atchison, Blair & Co Ltd, Clydebank, West Dunbartonshire. It drove a single screw propellern and could propel the ship at 9.5 knots (17.6 km/h).

== History ==
Empire Dorrit was launched on 4 October 1944 and completed in December. The United Kingdom Official Number 164922 and Code Letters MMRY were allocated. Her port of registry was Glasgow. She was placed under the management of William Robertson Ltd. Little is recorded of her wartime service, although she was a member of Convoy BTC 8, which departed from Milford Haven, Pembrokeshire on 15 December 1944 and arrived at Southend, Essex three days later. She was also a member of Convoy TBC 58, which departed from Southend on 3 February 1945 and arrived at Milford Haven three days later.

In 1945, Empire Dorrit was transferred to the French government and was renamed Lieutenant Lancelot, after a National Front leader who had been arrested by the Gestapo in 1944 and later died in a German prisoner of war camp. She was placed under the management of Société Navale Caennaise SA, Caen.

In 1954, Lieutenant Lancelot was sold to the Holderness Steamship Co Ltd and renamed Holdernith. She was assessed as 643 GRT, 263 NRT. She was operated under the management of T Kittlewell & Son Ltd, Hull, Yorkshire. On 17 January 1957, Holdernith ran aground on the Whitton Sand in the Humber Estuary and sank. She was refloated on 19 January and towed into Hull. On 13 April 1959, Holdernith ran aground off Burnham on Sea, Somerset whilst on a voyage from Combwich, Somerset to Glasgow. She was refloated undamaged a week later. Holdernith served until 1963. She was sold to Thos. W. Ward, Grays, Essex for breaking, arriving on 30 March.
