= SS Ribinsk =

Scrapped cargo ship

History
- Name: Hendrik Fisser VI (1943-45); Empire Garner (1945-47); Ribinsk (1947-75)
- Owner: Fisser & Van Doornum (1943-45); Ministry of War Transport (1945-46); Soviet Government (1946-75)
- Operator: Fisser & Van Doornum (1944-45); Currie Line Ltd (1945-46); Estonian Shipping Company (1946-49); Sakhalin State Shipping Company (1949-75)
- Port of registry: (Nazi Germany) Emden, Germany (1944-45); London, United Kingdom (1945-46); Tallinn, Soviet Union (1946-49); Kholmsk, Soviet Union (1949-75)
- Builder: NV Werft Gusto
- Yard number: 852
- Launched: 1943
- Completed: April 1944
- Out of service: 1975
- Identification: United Kingdom Official Number 1806742 (1945-46); Code Letters GSPD (1945-46); Soviet Register Number M-1603 (1946-75); Code Letters UKEH (1946-75)
- Fate: Scrapped

General characteristics
- Class & type: Hansa A type Cargo ship
- Tonnage: 1,923 GRT, 937 NRT, 3,120 DWT
- Length: 85.22 m (279 ft 7 in)
- Beam: 13.51 m (44 ft 4 in)
- Draught: 5.59 m (18 ft 4 in)
- Depth: 4.80 m (15 ft 9 in)
- Installed power: Compound steam engine, 1,200IHP
- Propulsion: Single screw propeller
- Speed: 10.5 knots (19.4 km/h)

Ribinsk (Russian: Рыбинск) was a Hansa A Type cargo ship which was built as Hendrik Fisser VI in 1943 by NV Werft Gusto, Schiedam, Netherlands for Fisser & Van Doornum, Emden Germany. She was seized as a prize of war in 1945, passing to the Ministry of War Transport and renamed Empire Garner. She was allocated to the Soviet Union in 1946 and was renamed Ribinsk. She served until 1975, when she was scrapped.

== Description ==
The ship was 85.22 m (279 ft 7 in) long, with a beam of 13.51 m (44 ft 4 in). She had a depth of 4.80 m (15 ft 9 in), and a draught of 5.59 m (18 ft 4 in). She was assessed as 1,923 GRT, 935 NRT, 3,120 DWT.

The ship was propelled by a compound steam engine, which had two cylinders of 42 cm (16 9/16 in) and two cylinders of 90 cm (35 7/16 in) diameter by 90 cm (35 7/16 in) inches stroke. The engine was built by NV Werft Gusto. Rated at 1,200IHP, it drove a single screw propeller and could propel the ship at 10.5 knots (19.4 km/h).

== History ==
Hendrik Fisser VI was a Hansa A Type cargo ship built in 1943 as yard number 852 by NV Werft Gusto, Schiedam, Netherlands for Fisser & Van Doornum, Emden, Germany. She was launched in 1943 and completed in April 1944. Her port of registry was Emden.

In May 1945, Hendrik Fisser VI was seized as a prize of war at Kiel. She was passed to the Ministry of War Transport and was renamed Empire Garner. The Code Letters GSPD and United Kingdom Official Number 180742 were allocated. Her port of registry was London and she was operated under the management of Currie Line Ltd.

In 1946, Empire Garner was allocated to the Soviet Union and was renamed Ribinsk. She was operated under the management of the Estonian Shipping Company. The Code Letters UKEH and register number M-1603 were allocated. Her port of registry was Tallinn. In 1949, she was transferred to the Sakhalin State Shipping Company, Kholmsk. She arrived at Izumiōtsu, Japan on 14 March 1975 for scrapping by Kyosho Tsusho.
