= SS Korsun Shevtshenkovsky =

History
- Name: Wilhelmshafen (1943-45); Empire Douglas (1945-46); Korsun Shevtshenkovsky (1946-72)
- Owner: Hamburg Amerikanische Packetfahrt AG (1943-45); Ministry of War Transport (1945); Ministry of Transport (1945-46); Soviet Government (1946-72)
- Operator: Hamburg Amerikanische Packetfahrt AG (1943-45); unknown manager (1945-46); Soviet Government (1946-72)
- Port of registry: Hamburg, Germany (1943-45); London, United Kingdom (1945-1946); Tallinn, Soviet Union (1946-72)
- Builder: Duivendijks Scheepwerke
- Launched: 1943
- Identification: United Kingdom Official Number 180738 (1945-46); Code Letters GNDJ (1945-46)
- Fate: Scrapped

General characteristics
- Type: Cargo ship
- Tonnage: 1,925 GRT; 937 NRT
- Length: 287 ft (87 m)
- Beam: 44 ft (13 m)
- Propulsion: Triple expansion steam engine

Korsun Shevtshenkovsky (Cyrillic: Корсүнь Шевченковкий) was a 1,925 GRT cargo ship that was built in 1943 as Wilhelmshafen by Duivendijks Scheepwerke, Lekkerkerk, Netherlands for Hamburg Amerikanische Packetfahrt AG. She was seized by the British in 1945, passed to the Ministry of War Transport (MoWT) and renamed Empire Douglas. She was transferred to the Soviet Government in 1946 and renamed Korsun Shevtshenkovsky, serving until 1972 when she was scrapped.

== Description ==
The ship was built in 1943 by Duivendijks Scheepwerke, Lekkerkerk.

The ship was 287 feet (87 m) long, with a beam of 44 feet (13 m). She was assessed at 1,925 GRT, 937 NRT.

The ship was propelled by a triple expansion steam engine.

== History ==
Wilhelmshafen was built for Hamburg Amerikanische Packetfahrt AG, Hamburg. She was launched in 1943. In 1945, she was seized by the British at Kiel. She was transferred to the MoWT and renamed Empire Douglas. The United Kingdom Official Number 180738 and Code Letters GNDJ were allocated. Her port of registry was changed to London.

In February 1946, Empire Douglas was transferred to the Soviet Union under the Potsdam Agreement. She was renamed Korsun Shevtshenkovsky (Корсүнь Шевченковкий). Her port of registry was Tallinn. She served until 1972, when she was scrapped at Ghent, Belgium.
