= SS Loch Ryan =

Heavy lift cargo liner

History
- Name: Empire Chieftain (1943-46); Loch Ryan (1946-60); Fair Ryan (1960)
- Owner: Ministry of War Transport (1943-45); Ministry of Transport (1945-46); Royal Mail Lines (1946-60); Argonaut Shipping & Trading Co Ltd (1960)
- Operator: Royal Mail Lines (1943-60); Argonaut Shipping & Trading Co Ltd (1960)
- Port of registry: (United Kingdom) Middlesbrough
- Builder: Furness Shipbuilding Company
- Yard number: 354
- Launched: 20 May 1943
- Completed: October 1943
- Identification: Code Letters BFKL; United Kingdom Official Number 164863
- Fate: Scrapped

General characteristics
- Tonnage: 9,904 GRT; 7,155 NRT
- Length: 475 ft 5 in (144.91 m)
- Beam: 64 ft 4 in (19.61 m)
- Depth: 40 ft 0 in (12.19 m)
- Installed power: Steam turbines
- Propulsion: Screw propeller

Loch Ryan was a 9,904 GRT heavy lift cargo liner which was built by Furness Shipbuilding Ltd, Haverton Hill-on-Tees in 1943 as Empire Chieftain for the Ministry of War Transport (MoWT). In 1946 she was sold to Royal Mail Lines and renamed Loch Ryan. She served until 1960, when she was sold to Argonaut Shipping & Trading Co Ltd and was renamed Fair Ryan, being scrapped later that year.

== Description ==
The ship was built by Furness Shipbuilding Ltd, Haverton Hill-on-Tees, as yard number 354. She was launched on 20 May 1943, and completed in October 1943.

The ship was 475 feet 5 inches (144.91 m) long, with a beam of 64 feet 4 inches (19.61 m) and a depth of 40 feet 0 inches (12.19 m). She had a GRT of 9,904 and a NRT of 7,155.

The ship was propelled by two steam turbines, double reduction geared, driving a screw propeller. The turbines were made by Richardsons, Westgarth & Co Ltd, Hartlepool.

== History ==
Empire Chieftain was built for the MoWT. The United Kingdom Official Number 164863 and the Code Letters BFKL were allocated. Her port of registry was Middlesbrough. She was placed under the management of Royal Mail Lines.

Empire Chieftain was a member of a number of convoys during the Second World War.

CU 57

Convoy CU 57 departed New York on 5 February 1945 and arrived at Liverpool on 14 February. Empire Chieftain joined the convoy at sea.

In 1946, Empire Chieftain was sold to Royal Mail Lines and was renamed Loch Ryan. She served until 1960. On 1 January 1960, she was sold to Argonaut Shipping & Trading Co Ltd, London and was renamed Fair Ryan for the voyage to the shipbreakers. She arrived on 2 July 1960 at Nagasaki, Japan for scrapping.
