= SS Anakriya =

German cargo ship

History
- Name: Riga (1925–34); Königsberg (1934–39); Stettin (1939–45); Empire Conway (1945–46); Stettin (1946); Anakriya (1946–78)
- Owner: Lübeck Linie AG (1925–34); Mathies Reederei (1934–45); Ministry of War Transport (1945); Ministry of Transport (1945–46); Soviet Government (1946–78)
- Operator: Lübeck Linie AG (1925–34); Mathies Reederei (1934–45); R S Dalgleish (1945–46); Soviet Government (1946–78)
- Port of registry: (Weimar Republic) Lübeck (1925–33); (Nazi Germany) Lübeck (1933–34); (Nazi Germany) Hamburg (1934–45); (United Kingdom) London (1945–46); Soviet Union (1946–78)
- Builder: Travewerk Gebrüder Goedhart AG
- Launched: 1 September 1925
- Completed: 4 November 1925
- Identification: Code Letters PCDM (1925–34); Code Letters GKTM (1945–46); United Kingdom Official Number 180787 (1945–46)
- Fate: Scrapped

General characteristics
- Type: Cargo ship
- Tonnage: 999 GRT (1925–45); 1,000 GRT (1945–78); 571 NRT (1925–45); 572 NRT (1945–78)
- Length: 217 ft 1 in (66.17 m)
- Beam: 34 ft 6 in (10.52 m)
- Draught: 14 ft 6 in (4.42 m)
- Depth: 12 ft 9 in (3.89 m)
- Installed power: Triple expansion steam engine
- Propulsion: Screw propeller
- Speed: 9.5 knots (17.6 km/h)
- Range: 6,175 nautical miles (11,436 km) at 9.5 knots (17.6 km/h)

Anakriya was a 1,000 GRT cargo ship that was built in 1925 as Riga by Travewerk Gebrüder Goedhart AG, Hamburg, Germany. After a sale in 1934 she was renamed Königsberg. In 1939, she was renamed Stettin. In 1945, she was seized by the Allies at Hamburg, passed to the Ministry of War Transport (MoWT) and was renamed Empire Conway. In 1946, she was passed to the Soviet Union, initially renamed Stettin, and then renamed Anakriya.

== Description ==
The ship was built in 1925 by Travewerk Gebrüder Goedhart AG, Lübeck. She was launched on 1 September 1925, and entered service on 4 November.

The ship was 217 feet 1 inch (66.17 m) long, with a beam of 34 feet 6 inches (10.52 m). She had a depth of 12 feet 9 inches (3.89 m), and a draught of 34 feet 6 inches (10.52 m). She was assessed at 999 GRT, 571 NRT.

The ship was propelled by a triple expansion steam engine, which had cylinders of 16 5/16 inches (41.4 cm) 26 3/4 inches (68 cm) and 43 5/16 inches (110.0 cm) diameter by 27 9/16 inches (70.0 cm) stroke. The engine was built by Görlitzer Maschinenfabrik, Görlitz. It could propel the ship at 9.5 knots (17.6 km/h). The ship had a range of 6,175 nautical miles (11,436 km) at 9.5 knots (17.6 km/h), burning 286 tonnes (281 long tons) of coal.

== History ==
Riga was built for Lübeck Linie AG, Lübeck. She was allocated the Code Letters PCDM. In 1934, Riga was sold to Matthies Reederei, Hamburg and was renamed Königsberg. She was renamed Stettin in 1939. On 4 September 1940. Stettin entered service as a hospital ship, with beds for 70 patients. She was employed in this rôle until 14 December. Between 7 August 1941 and 23 January 1943 she was used as a transport ship.

In May 1945, Stettin was seized by the Allies at Hamburg. She departed Hamburg for the United Kingdom on 9 July 1945. She was passed to the MoWT and renamed Empire Conway. She was placed under the management of R S Dalgleish Ltd, Newcastle upon Tyne. Her port of registry was changed to London. The Code Letters GKTM were allocated. She was reassessed as 1,000 GRT, 572 NRT. The United Kingdom Official Number 180787 was allocated.

In 1946, Empire Conway was allocated to the Soviet Union. She was renamed Stettin. She was later renamed Anakriya. Anakriya was removed from shipping registers in 1960, and was scrapped in 1978.
