= SS Ryazan (1944) =

German Cargo Ship

History
- Name: Licentia (1944–45); Empire Gabon (1945–46); Ryazan (1946–79); Rudi (1979)
- Owner: J Jost (1944–45); Ministry of War Transport (1945–46); Soviet Government (1946–79); Eckhardt & Co (1979)
- Operator: J Jost (1944–45); Ellerman Wilson's Line Ltd (1945–46); Soviet Government (1946–79); Eckhardt & Co (1979)
- Port of registry: (Nazi Germany) Flensburg, Germany (1944–45); London, United Kingdom (1945–46); Riga, Soviet Union (1946–79); Hamburg, West Germany (1979)
- Builder: Flensburger Schiffbau-Gesellschaft
- Yard number: 467
- Launched: 19 August 1944
- In service: 28 November 1944
- Identification: United Kingdom Official Number 180675 (1945–46); Code Letters GNFX (1945–46); Code Letters UKED (1946–79); IMO number: 5294113 ( –1979)
- Fate: Scrapped

General characteristics
- Class & type: Hansa A type Cargo ship
- Tonnage: 1,925 GRT, 936 NRT, 3,118 DWT
- Length: 85.19 m (279 ft 6 in)
- Beam: 13.49 m (44 ft 3 in)
- Depth: 4.78 m (15 ft 8 in)
- Installed power: Compound steam engine, 1,200IHP
- Speed: 10.5 knots (19.4 km/h)

Ryazan (Russian: Рязань) was a Hansa A Type cargo ship which was built as Licentia in 1944 by Flensburger Schiffbau-Gesellschaft, Flensburg, Germany for J Jost, Flensburg. She was seized as a prize of war in 1945, passing to the Ministry of War Transport and renamed Empire Gabon. Allocated to the Soviet Union in 1946, she served until 1979 when she was sold to West Germany and renamed Rudi. She was scrapped at Santander, Spain that year.

== Description ==
The ship was 85.19 m (279 ft 6 in) long, with a beam of 13.49 m (44 ft 3 in). She had a depth of 4.78 m (15 ft 8 in). She was assessed as 1,925 GRT, 936 NRT, 3,118 DWT.

The ship was propelled by a compound steam engine, which had two cylinders of 42 cm (16 9/16 inches) and two cylinders of 90 cm (35 7/16 inches) diameter by 90 cm (35 7/16 inches) stroke. The engine was built by Flensberger Schiffsbau-Geschellschaft. Rated at 1,200IHP, it could propel the ship at 10.5 knots (19.4 km/h).

== History ==
Licentia was a Hansa A Type cargo ship built in 1944 as yard number 467 by Flensburger Schiffbau-Gesellschaft, Flensburg, Germany for J Jost, Flensburg. She was launched on 19 August 1944 and completed on 14 November.

Licentia was seized as a prize of war at Flensburg in May 1945, and was passed to the Ministry of War Transport. She was renamed Empire Gabon. The Code Letters GNFX and United Kingdom Official Number 180675 were allocated. Her port of registry was London and she was operated under the management of Ellerman's Wilson Line Ltd, Hull, Yorkshire.

In 1946, Empire Gabon was allocated to the Soviet Union. She was renamed Ryazan. Her port of registry was Riga and the Code Letters UKED were allocated. On 12 November 1956, dockers at Liverpool, Lancashire, United Kingdom refused to work on Ryazan, which had arrived from Riga and was to load a cargo of rubber. They were angry at the situation in Hungary. The dockers refused to load her cargo on to a Danish ship, saying "we won't handle any cargo for Russia". Ryazan sailed for Riga on 19 November. With their introduction in the 1960s, Ryazan was allocated the IMO Number 5294113. She served until 1979, when she was sold to Echkardt & Co., Hamburg, West Germany and was renamed Rudi. She was scrapped in 1979 at Santander, Spain.
