= SS Memel =

Merchant ship (1925–1977)

Coordinates: 40.43°N 27.38°E

History
- Name: Reval (1925–34); Memel (1934–45); Empire Constellation (1945–46); Ivan Sechenov (1946–1977)
- Owner: Lübeck Linie AG (1925–34); Mathies Reederei (1934–45); Ministry of War Transport (1945); Ministry of Transport (1945–46); Soviet Government (1946–1977)
- Operator: Lübeck Linie AG (1925–34); Mathies Reederei (1934–45); J Hay & Sons Ltd (1945–46); Soviet Government (1946–1977)
- Port of registry: (Weimar Republic) Lübeck (1925–33); (Nazi Germany) Lübeck (1933–34); (Nazi Germany) Hamburg (1934–45); (United Kingdom) London (1945–46); Soviet Union (1946–1977)
- Builder: Schiffs-und Dockbauwerft Flender
- Launched: 1925
- Identification: Code Letters PCDL (1925-34); Code Letters DRBK (1934–45); Code Letters GKTC (1945–46); United Kingdom Official Number 180774 (1945–46)
- Fate: Decommissioned in 1971

General characteristics
- Type: Cargo ship
- Tonnage: 1,102 GRT; 575 NRT
- Length: 220 ft 7 in (67.23 m)
- Beam: 34 ft 6 in (10.52 m)
- Depth: 12 ft 5 in (3.78 m)
- Installed power: Triple expansion steam engine
- Propulsion: Screw propeller

Memel was a 1,102 GRT cargo ship that was built in 1925 as Reval by Schiffs-und Dockbauwerft Flender AG, Lübeck, Germany for German owners. A sale in 1934 saw her renamed Memel. She was seized by the Allies in May 1945, passed to the Ministry of War Transport (MoWT) and was renamed Empire Constellation. In 1946, she was transferred to the Soviet Union and renamed Ivan Sechenov.^{[Note A]}

== Description ==
The ship was built in 1925 by Schiffs-und Dockbauwerft Flender AG, Lübeck.

The ship was 220 feet 7 inches (67.23 m) long, with a beam of 34 feet 6 inches (10.52 m) and a depth of 12 feet 5 inches (3.78 m). The ship had a GRT of 1,102 and a NRT of 575.

The ship was propelled by a triple expansion steam engine, which had cylinders of 16 3/4 inches (43 cm), 27 9/16 inches (70.0 cm) and 43 5/16 inches (110.0 cm) diameter by 27 9/16 inches (70.0 cm) stroke. The engine was built by Waggon-und Maschinenbau AG, Görlitz.

== History ==
Reval was built for Lübeck Linie AG, Lübeck. Her port of registry was Lübeck. The Code Letters PCDL were allocated. In 1929, her captain was Walter Heinrich Giermann, who had previously captained the four-masted schooner Vaterland. In 1934, Reval was sold to Mathies Reederei, Hamburg and was renamed Memel after the Baltic port ceded to Lithuania after World War I. Her port of registry was changed to Hamburg and the Code Letters DRBK were allocated.

In May 1945, Memel was seized by the Allies at Flensburg. She was passed to the MoWT and renamed Empire Constellation. Her port of registry was changed to London and she was placed under the management of J Hay & Sons Ltd. The Code Letters GKTC and United Kingdom Official Number 180774 were allocated. In 1946, Empire Constellation was transferred to the Soviet Union, and was renamed Ivan Gegenov.

== Notes ==
^Note A Mitchell & Sawyer give the name as Ivan Sechenov (Ива́н Се́ченов), but it was recorded as Ivan Gegenov in contemporary shipping registers. It is possible that she was later renamed Ivan Sechenov or that Ivan Gegenov is an error.
