= SS M O P 223-C =

Suction hopper dredger

History
- Name: Empire Forager (1946–49); M O P 229-C (1949); La Descanisada (1949–58); M O P 223-C (1958–76)
- Owner: Ministry of War Transport (1946); Ministry of Transport (1946–49); Argentinian Government (1949–76)
- Operator: Henry Abram Ltd (1946–49); Ministry of Public Work (1949–76)
- Port of registry: Glasgow, United Kingdom (1946–49); Buenos Aires, Argentina (1949–76)
- Builder: William Simons & Co Ltd
- Yard number: 767
- Launched: 19 March 1946
- Identification: United Kingdom Official Number 169468; Code Letters GKLN (1946–49); IMO number: 5215818 ( –1976)
- Fate: Scrapped

General characteristics
- Class & type: Dredger
- Tonnage: 2,588 GRT
- Length: 287 ft 7 in (87.66 m) (LPP); 295 ft 2 in (89.97 m) (OL)
- Beam: 52 ft 5 in (15.98 m)
- Draught: 21 ft 0 in (6.40 m)
- Depth: 20 ft 8 in (6.30 m)
- Installed power: 2 triple expansion steam engines
- Propulsion: Twin screw propellers

M O P 223-C was a 2,588 GRT suction hopper dredger that was built in 1946 by William Simons & Co Ltd, Renfrew, United Kingdom as Empire Forager for the Ministry of War Transport (MoWT). She was sold in 1949 to the Argentinian Government and renamed M O P 229-C. She was renamed La Descanisada later that year and then renamed M O P 223-C in 1958, serving until she was scrapped in 1976.

== Description ==
The ship was 287 ft 7 in (87.66 m) between perpendiculars (295 ft 2 in (89.97 m) overall), with a beam of 52 feet 5 inches (15.98 m). She had a depth of 20 feet 8 inches (6.30 m) and a draught of 21 feet 0 inches (6.40 m). She was assessed at 2,588 GRT, 1,091 NRT.

The ship was propelled by two triple expansion steam engines, which each had cylinders of 18 inches (46 cm), 28 inches (71 cm) and 40 inches (100 cm) diameter by 27 inches (69 cm) stroke. The engines were built by William Simons & Co. Ltd. Each engine drove a single screw propeller.

== History ==
The ship was built in 1941 by William Simons & Co. Ltd., Renfrew, United Kingdom. She was yard number 767. She was launched on 19 March 1946 and completed in April. Her port of registry was Greenock. The Code Letters GKLN and United Kingdom Official Number 169468 were allocated. Empire Forager was operated under the management of H. Abram Ltd.

In 1949, Empire Forager was sold to the Argentinian Government and was renamed M O P 229-C. Her port of registry was Buenos Aires. She was operated by the Ministry of Public Works. Later that year, she was renamed La Descanisada. She was renamed M O P 223-C in 1958. With the introduction of IMO Numbers in the 1960s, M O P 223-C was allocated the number 5215818. She served until 1976 when she was scrapped.
