= MV Mironave =

German built merchant ship (1938)

History
- Name: Luna (1938–45); Empire Concave (1945–46); Galtnes (1946–47); Ila (1947–52); São Leopoldo (1952–65); Mironave (1965–82)
- Owner: Neptun Line (1938–40); Kriegsmarine (1940–45); Ministry or War Transport (1945); Ministry of Transport (1945–46); Norwegian Government (1946–47); Per T Lykke (1947–52); L Figueiredo Navegação (1952–65); Casimiro Filho Industria Comercio (1965–82); Petrosul (1982– )
- Operator: Neptun Line (1938–40); Kriegsmarine (1940–45); Ministry or War Transport (1945); Ministry of Transport (1945–46); Norwegian Government (1946–47); Per T Lykke (1947–52); L Figueiredo Navegação (1952–65); Casimiro Filho Industria Comercio (1965–82); Petrosul (1982– )
- Port of registry: (Germany) Bremen (1939–40); (Nazi Germany) Kriegsmarine (1940–45); (United Kingdom) London (1945–46); (Norway) Oslo (1946–47); (Norway) Trondheim (1947–52); Brazil (1952–82)
- Builder: Schiffbau-Gesellschaft Unterweser AG
- Launched: 22 October 1938
- Identification: Code Letters DOUV (1938–45); Code Letters GFKM (1945–46); United Kingdom Official Number: 180650 (1945–46)
- Fate: Deleted from registers 3 August 2010

General characteristics
- Type: Passenger ship (1938–42); Cargo ship (1942–82)
- Tonnage: 1,125 GRT; 571 NRT
- Length: 234 ft 9 in (71.55 m)
- Beam: 32 ft 1 in (9.78 m)
- Depth: 12 ft 7 in (3.84 m)
- Installed power: 4SCSA diesel engine
- Propulsion: 2 screw propellers

Mironave was a 1,125 GRT cargo ship that was built as a passenger ship in 1938 by Schiffbau-Gesellschaft Unterweser AG, Wesermünde, Germany for German owners. In 1940, she was requisitioned by the Kriegsmarine. Seized by the Allies in 1945, she was passed to the Ministry of War Transport (MoWT) and renamed Empire Concave. In 1946, she was passed to the Norwegian Government and renamed Galtnes. She was sold into merchant service in 1947 and renamed Ila. In 1952, she was sold to Brazil and was renamed São Leopoldo. In 1965, a further sale saw her renamed Mironave. She was still in active service in 1982, when a further sale took place.

== Description ==
The ship was built in 1938 by Schiffbau-Gesellschaft Unterweser AG, Wesermünde.

The ship was 234 feet 9 inches (71.55 m) long, with a beam of 34 feet 7 inches (10.54 m) and a depth of 14 feet 4 inches (4.37 m). She had a gross register tonnage of 1,125 and a net register tonnage of 571.

The ship was propelled by a 4-stroke single-cycle double-acting diesel engine, which had 12 cylinders of 11 1/4-inch (29 cm) diameter by 16 9/16-inch (42.1 cm) stroke. The engine was built by Maschinenfabriek Augsburg-Nürnberg AG, Augsburg. It drove twin screw propellers.

== History ==
Luna was built for Dampfschiffahrts Gesellschaft Neptun AG (Neptun Line). She had a passenger certificate. Her port of registry was Bremen and the Code Letters DOUV were allocated. In 1940, Luna was requisitioned by the Kriegsmarine. In 1942, she is recorded as no longer holding a passenger certificate. She was seized by the Allies at Eckernförde in May 1945 and passed to the MoWT, renamed Empire Concave. Her port of registry was changed to London. The Code Letters GFKM and United Kingdom Official Number 180650 were allocated. In 1946, Empire Concave was allocated to Norway, and passed to the Norwegian Government. She was renamed Galtnes. In 1947, she was sold to Per T Lykke, Trondheim and renamed Ila. In 1952, she was sold to L Figueiredo Navegação, Brazil and renamed São Leopoldo. She was sold to Casimiro Filho Industria Comercio in 1965 and renamed Mironave. In 1982, she was sold to Petrosul.
