= SS Justinian =

Cargo ship

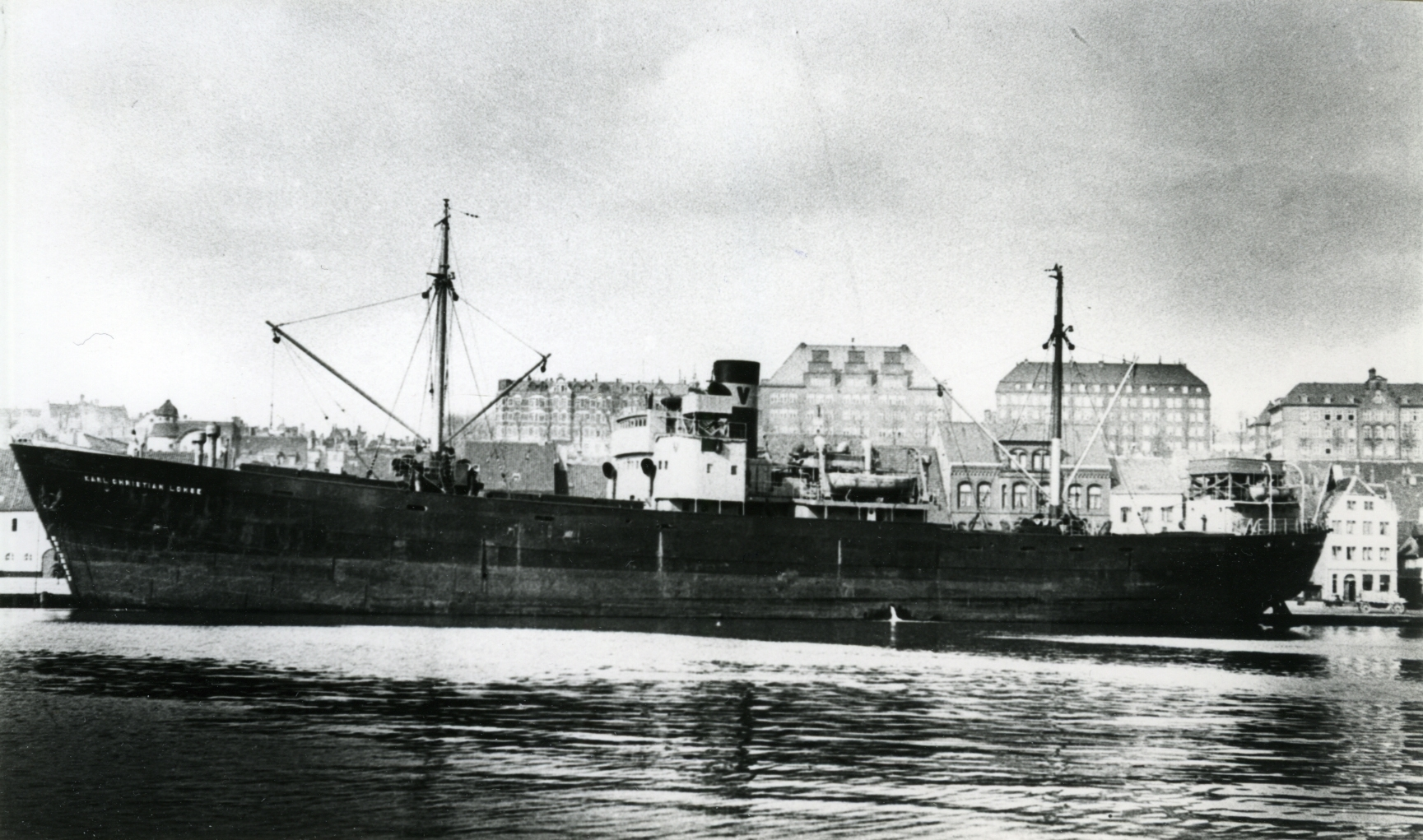

History
- Name: Justinian (1940-42); Karl Christian Lohse (1942-45); Empire Conningbeg (1945-46); Fuglenes (1946); Justinian (1946-54); Inge R Christophersen (1954-65)
- Owner: Hilmar Reksten (1940-42); Reederei H P Vith (1942-45); Ministry of War Transport (1945); Ministry of Transport (1945-46); Sjøfartsdirektoratet (1946); AS Rederi Julian (1946-54); H W Christophersen (1954-65)
- Operator: Reederei H P Vith (1942-45); Currie Line Ltd; Sjøfartsdirektoratet (1946); Hilmar Reksten (1946-54); H W Christophersen (1954-65)
- Port of registry: (Nazi Germany) Hamburg (1940-45); (United Kingdom) London (1945-46); (Norway) Oslo (1946); (Norway) Bergen (1946-54); (West Germany) Flensburg (1954-65)
- Builder: Nobiskrug Werft
- Launched: 1940
- Completed: May 1942
- Identification: Code Letters GLFT (1945-46); Code Letters LLTU (1946-54); United Kingdom Official Number 180647 (1945-46)
- Fate: Scrapped

General characteristics
- Type: Cargo ship
- Tonnage: 1,875 GRT (1942-46) 1,894 GRT (1946-65); 1,006 NRT (1942-46) 1,033 NRT (1946-65); 2,845 DWT (1946-65)
- Length: 263 ft 9 in (80.39 m)
- Beam: 42 ft 1 in (12.83 m)
- Depth: 16 ft 6 in (5.03 m)
- Installed power: Compound steam engine
- Propulsion: Screw propeller
- Speed: 10.5 knots (19.4 km/h)

Justinian was a 1,875 GRT cargo ship that was built in 1940 by Nobiskrug Werft, Rendsburg for a Norwegian owner. She was seized on completion, renamed Karl Christian Lohse and used by a German company. She was seized by the Allies in May 1945 at Flensburg, passed to the Ministry of War Transport (MoWT) and renamed Empire Conningbeg.

In 1946, she was transferred to the Norwegian Government and renamed Fuglenes. In 1947, she was transferred to her original owner and renamed Justinian. She was sold to a West German owner in 1954 and renamed Inge R Christophersen. She served until 1965, when she was scrapped.

== Description ==
The ship was built by Nobiskrug Werft, Rendsburg. She was launched in 1940. Completion was in May 1942.

The ship was 263 feet 9 inches (80.39 m) long, with a beam of 42 feet 1 inch (12.83 m) and had a depth of 16 feet 6 inches (5.03 m). As built, he ship had a GRT of 1,875 and a NRT of 1,006.

The ship was propelled by a compound steam engine which had two cylinders of 14 9/16 inches (37.0 cm) and two cylinders of 31 1/2 inches (80 cm) diameter by 31 1/2 inches (80 cm) stroke. It could propel the ship at 10.5 knots (19.4 km/h).

== History ==
Justinian was built for Hilmar Reksten, Bergen. On completion in May 1942, she was seized by the German authorities. She was passed to H P Vith, Hamburg and renamed Karl Christian Lohse. In May 1945, she was seized by the Allies at Flensburg, passed to the MoWT and renamed Empire Conningbeg. She was placed under the management of Currie Line Ltd, Leith. Her port of registry was changed to London. The Code Letters GLFT and United Kingdom Official Number 180647 were allocated.

In 1946, Empire Conningbeg was transferred to the Norwegian Government and renamed Fuglenes. She was placed under the control of the Sjøfartsdirektortet. The Code Letters LLTU were allocated and her port of registry was changed to Oslo. She was recorded as being 1,894 GRT, 1,033 NRT and 2,845 DWT. In November 1946, Fuglenes was transferred to AS Rederi Julian, Bergen. She was renamed Justinian and placed under the management of Hilmar Reksten, Bergen. In 1954, Justinian was sold to H W Christophersen, Hamburg, West Germany and was renamed Inge R Christophersen. She was sold for scrap in May 1965, arriving at Hamburg on 9 May for scrapping.
