= SS Empire Airman =

SS Empire Airman was the name of two ships during the Second World War.

- SS Empire Airman (1915) was sunk by U-100 in September 1940.
- SS Empire Airman (1941) was launched in 1941 and became SS San Wenceslao in 1946. She was scrapped in 1959.
