= SS Marie Fisser =

A German-built cargo ship later renamed Empire Conisborough and Stepan Shaumian

History
- Name: Marie Fisser (1937–1945); Empire Congisborough (1945–46); Stepan Shaumian (1946– )
- Owner: Fisser & Van Doornum (1937–45); Ministry of War Transport (1945); Ministry of Transport (1945–46); Soviet Government (1946– )
- Operator: Fisser & Van Doornum (1937–45); Dundee, Perth & London Shipping Co Ltd (1945–46); Soviet Government (1946– )
- Port of registry: (Nazi Germany) Emden (1937–45); (United Kingdom) London (1945–46); Soviet Union (1946– )
- Builder: Lübecker Flender-Werke AG
- Launched: 1937
- Identification: Code Letters DGLG (1937–45); Code Letters GMXM (1945–46); United Kingdom Official Number 180713 (1945–46)
- Status: In active service as of 1946

General characteristics
- Type: Cargo ship
- Tonnage: 1,235 GRT; 685 NRT
- Length: 222 ft 4 in (67.77 m)
- Beam: 34 ft 8 in (10.57 m)
- Depth: 13 ft 6 in (4.11 m)
- Installed power: Compound steam engine
- Propulsion: Screw propeller

Marie Fisser was a 1,235 GRT cargo ship that was built in 1937 by Lübecker Flender-Werke AG, Lübeck for German owners. She was seized by the Allies at Emden in May 1945, passed to the Ministry of War Transport (MoWT) and renamed Empire Conisborough. In 1946, she was passed to the Soviet Union and renamed Stepan Shaumian.

== Description ==
The ship was built in 1937 by Lübecker Flender-Werke AG, Lübeck.

The ship was 222 feet 4 inches (67.77 m) long, with a beam of 34 feet 8 inches (10.57 m) a depth of 13 feet 6 inches (4.11 m). She had a GRT of 1,235 and a NRT of 685.

The ship was propelled by a compound steam engine which had two cylinders of 12 15/16 inches (33 cm) and two cylinders of 27 9/16 inches (70 cm) diameter by 27 9/16 inches (70 cm) stroke. The engine was built by Christiansen & Meyer, Hamburg.

== History ==
Marie Fisser was built for Fisser & Van Dornum, Emden. Her port of registry was Emden and she used the Code Letters DGLG. In May 1945, Marie Fisser was seized by the Allies at Emden in a damaged condition. She was passed to the MoWT and renamed Empire Conisborough. Her port of registry was changed to London and she was placed under the management of the Dundee, Perth & London Steamship Co Ltd. She was allocated the Code Letters GMXM and the United Kingdom Official Number 180713. In 1946 she was passed to the Soviet Union and renamed Stepan Shaumian.
