= SS Volochaevsk =

German, and later Soviet cargo ship

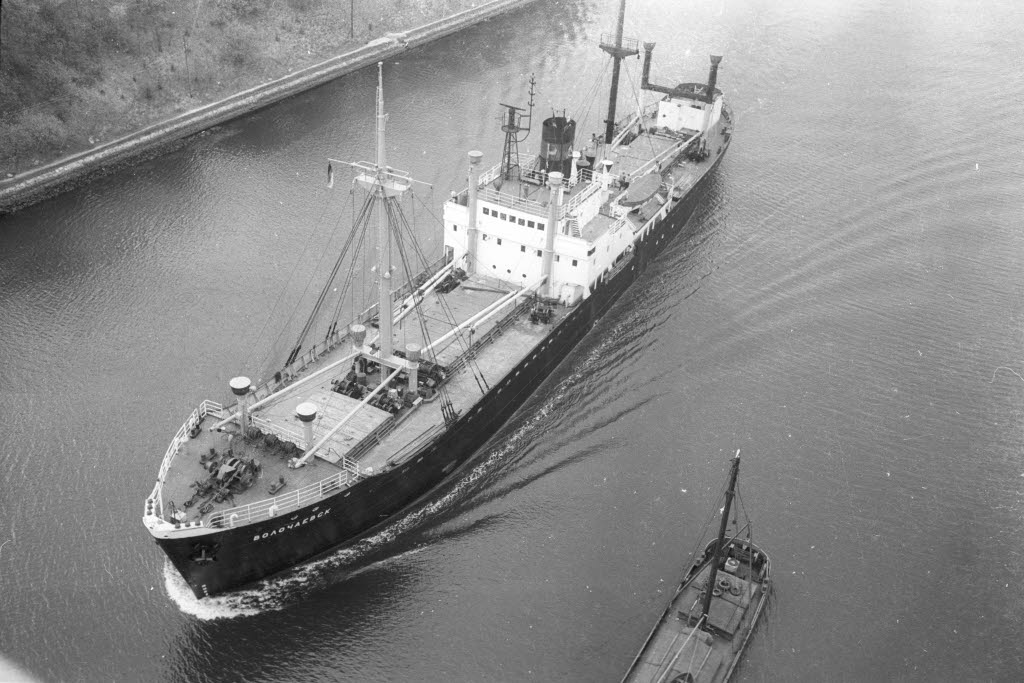
- Volochaevsk

History
- Name: Weserwald (1943-45); Empire Galveston (1945-46); Volochaevsk (1946-73)
- Owner: Norddeutscher Lloyd (1943-45); Ministry of War Transport (1945-46); Soviet Government (1946-73)
- Operator: Norddeutscher Lloyd (1944-45); Fred Nichols & Son (1945-46); Estonian Shipping Co. (1946-73)
- Port of registry: (Nazi Germany) Hamburg, Germany (1943-45); London, United Kingdom (1945-46); Tallinn, Soviet Union (1946-73)
- Builder: Deutsche Werft
- Yard number: 430
- Launched: 20 November 1943
- Completed: 27 January 1944
- Out of service: 1962
- Identification: United Kingdom Official Number 180784 (1945-46); Code Letters GYMW (1945-46); Code Letters UKEJ (1946-73); IMO number: 5383392 ( –1973)
- Fate: Scrapped

General characteristics
- Class & type: Hansa A type Cargo ship
- Tonnage: 1,925 GRT, 936 NRT, 3,120 DWT
- Length: 85.24 m (279 ft 8 in)
- Beam: 13.51 m (44 ft 4 in)
- Draught: 5.59 m (18 ft 4 in)
- Depth: 4.78 m (15 ft 8 in)
- Installed power: Compound steam engine, 1,200IHP
- Propulsion: Single screw propeller
- Speed: 10.5 knots (19.4 km/h)
- Capacity: 5,185 cubic metres (183,107 cu ft) grain

Volochaevsk (Russian: Волочаевск - rendered as Воʌочаевск on the ship using the alternative Cyrillic el) was a Hansa A Type cargo ship which was built as Weserwald in 1943 by Deutsche Werft, Hamburg, Germany for Norddeutsche Lloyd, Hamburg. She was seized as a prize of war in 1945, passing to the Ministry of War Transport and renamed Empire Galveston. She was allocated to the Soviet Union in 1946 and was renamed Volochaevsk. She served until 1973, when she was scrapped.

== Description ==
The ship was 85.24 m (279 ft 8 in) long, with a beam of 13.51 m (44 ft 4 in). She had a depth of 4.78 m (15 ft 8 in), and a draught of 5.59 m (18 ft 4 in). She was assessed as 1,935 GRT, 936 NRT, 3,120 DWT. She had a capacity of 5,185 cubic metres (183,107 cu ft) of grain.

The ship was propelled by a compound steam engine, which had two cylinders of 42 cm (16 9/16 in) and two cylinders of 90 cm (35 7/16 in) diameter by 90 cm stroke. The engine was built by Deutsche Werft. Rated at 1,200 IHP, it drove a single screw propeller and could propel the ship at 10.5 knots (19.4 km/h).

== History ==
Weserwald was a Hansa A Type cargo ship built in 1943 as yard number 430 by Deutsche Werft, Hamburg, Germany for Hansa Line, Bremen, Germany. She was launched on 20 November 1943 and completed on 27 January 1944. Her port of registry was Hamburg.

In May 1945, Weserwald was seized as a prize of war at Flensburg. She was passed to the Ministry of War Transport and was renamed Empire Galveston. The Code Letters GYMW and United Kingdom Official Number 180874 were allocated. Her port of registry was London and she was operated under the management of Fred Nicholls & Son.

In 1946,Empire Galveston was allocated to the Soviet Union and was renamed Volochaevsk. Her port of registry was Tallinn and the Code Letters UKEJ were allocated. She was operated under the management of the Estonian Shipping Company. With their introduction in the 1960s, She was allocated the IMO Number 5383392. Volochaevsk served until 1973, when she was scrapped in the Soviet Union.
