= SS Hewsang =

History
- Name: Empire Bermuda (1944-49); Hewsang (1949-63); Sunshine (1963-70)
- Owner: Ministry of War Transport (1944-49); Indo-China Steam Navigation Co Ltd (1949-63); Sunshine Navigation Co Ltd (1949-63)
- Operator: Joseph Constantine Steamship Line (1944-49); Indo-China Steam Navigation Co Ltd (1949-63); Patt Manfield & Co Ltd, Hong Kong (1963-70)
- Port of registry: (United Kingdom) West Hartlepool (1944-49); United Kingdom (1949-63); Panama City (1963-70)
- Builder: William Gray & Co Ltd, West Hartlepool.
- Yard number: 1173
- Launched: 30 September 1944
- Identification: UK Official Number 180078; Code Letters GDMP (1944-49)
- Fate: Scrapped

General characteristics
- Tonnage: 3,539 GRT, 2,257 NRT
- Length: 315 ft 5 in (96.14 m)
- Beam: 46 ft 5 in (14.15 m)
- Depth: 22 ft 1 in (6.73 m)
- Propulsion: One triple expansion steam engine.

Hewsang was a 3,539 GRT cargo ship which was built by William Gray & Co Ltd, West Hartlepool in 1944 as Empire Bermuda for the Ministry of War Transport (MoWT). Postwar she was sold into merchant service and renamed Hewsang and later sold to new owners and renamed Sunshine, serving until scrapped in 1970.

== Description ==
Empire Bermuda was built by William Gray & Co Ltd, West Hartlepool. She was yard number 1173 and was launched on 30 September 1944 with completion in November. She was 315 feet 5 inches (96.14 m) long, with a beam of 46 feet 5 inches (14.15 m) and a depth of 22 feet 1 inch (6.73 m). Her GRT was 3,359, with a NRT of 2,257.

== Career ==
Empire Bermuda was placed under the management of the Joseph Constantine Steamship Line by the MoWT. In 1949, she was sold to the Indo-China Steam Navigation Co Ltd, London and renamed Hewsang. In 1963, Hewsang was sold to the Sunshine Navigation Co Ltd, Panama and renamed Sunshine. She was placed under the management of Patt Manfield & Co Ltd, Hong Kong. The ship was scrapped at Kaohsiung, Taiwan in March 1970.

== Official Numbers and Code Letters ==
Official Numbers were a forerunner to IMO Numbers. Empire Bermuda had the UK Official Number 180078 and the Code Letters GDMP.

== Propulsion ==
The ship was propelled by a triple expansion steam engine which had cylinders of 20 inches (51 cm), 31 inches (79 cm) and 55 inches (140 cm) bore by 39 inches (99 cm) stroke. It was built by the Central Marine Engineering Works, West Hartlepool.
