= SS Podolsk =

Podolsk: Former Hansa cargo ship

History
- Name: Weserstrand (1944-45); Empire Gala (1945-46); Podolsk (1946-48)
- Owner: Norddeutscher Lloyd (1944-45); Ministry of War Transport (1945-46); Soviet Government (1946-48)
- Operator: Norddeutscher Lloyd (1944-45); France, Fenwick, Tyne & Wear Co. Ltd (1945-46); Soviet Government (1946-48)
- Port of registry: (Nazi Germany) Bremen, Germany (1944-45); London, United Kingdom (1945-46); Soviet Union (1946-48)
- Builder: NV Nederland Scheepsbouw Maatschappij
- Yard number: 354
- Launched: 1 July 1944
- In service: March 1945
- Out of service: 9 January 1948
- Identification: United Kingdom Official Number 180584 (1945-46); Code Letters GJFW (1945-46)
- Fate: Sank

General characteristics
- Class & type: Hansa A type Cargo ship
- Tonnage: 1,923 GRT; 935 NRT; 3,100 DWT
- Length: 85.85 m (281 ft 8 in)
- Beam: 13.51 m (44 ft 4 in)
- Depth: 4.80 m (15 ft 9 in)
- Installed power: Compound steam engine, 1,200IHP
- Speed: 10.5 knots (19.4 km/h)

Podolsk (Russian: Подольск) was a Hansa A Type cargo ship which was built as Weserstrand in 1944 by NV Nederland Scheepsbouw Maatschappij, Amsterdam, Netherlands for Norddeutscher Lloyd. She was seized by the British empire as a prize of war in 1945, passing to the Ministry of War Transport and being renamed Empire Gala. She was allocated to the Soviet Union in 1946 and renamed Podolsk. She would serve the Soviet navy until 1948, when she ran aground in the Yangtze River and sank.

== Description ==
The ship was 85.85 m (281 ft 8 in) long, with a beam of 13.51 m (44 ft 4 in). She had a depth of 4.80 m (15 ft 9 in). She was assessed as 1,923 GRT, 935 NRT, 3,100 DWT.

The ship was propelled by a compound steam engine, which had two cylinders of 42 cm (16 9/16 inches) and two cylinders of 90 cm (35 7/16 inches) diameter by 90 cm (35 7/16 inches) stroke. The engine was built by Werkspoor NV, Amsterdam. Rated at 1,200IHP, it drove a single screw propeller and could propel the ship at 10.5 knots (19.4 km/h).

== History ==
Weserstrand was a Hansa A Type cargo ship built in 1944 as yard number 354 by NV Nederland Scheepsbouw Maatschappij, Amsterdam, North Holland, Netherlands for Norddeutscher Lloyd. Launched on 1 July 1944, she was completed by Rickmers Werft, Bremerhaven, Germany in March 1945. Her port of registry was Bremen.

In May 1945, Weserstrand was seized as a prize of war at Kiel. She was passed to the Ministry of War Transport. She was renamed Empire Gala. The Code Letters GJFW and United Kingdom Official Number 180604 were allocated. Her port of registry was London and she was operated under the management of France, Fenwick, Tyne & Wear Co. Ltd.

In 1946, Empire Gage was allocated to the Soviet Union and was renamed Podolsk. She served until 9 January 1948, when she ran aground on the Amherst Rocks, in the Yangtze 60 nautical miles (110 km) from Wusong, China. Podolsk sank on 11 January.
