= List of shipwrecks in 1954 =

The list of shipwrecks in 1954 includes ships sunk, foundered, grounded, or otherwise lost during 1954.

table of contents
1954
Jan	Feb	Mar	Apr
May	Jun	Jul	Aug
Sep	Oct	Nov	Dec
Unknown date

== January ==
=== 4 January ===
List of shipwrecks: 4 January 1954
Ship	State	Description
Leros	Greece	The tanker ran aground on Scharhörn, in the Elbe estuary. She was pulled off the reef and towed into Cuxhaven on early morning 10 January, after many failed attempts and heavy damage.
Traunstein	West Germany	The steamship ran aground on Scharhörn and was refloated on the same day.

=== 10 January ===
List of shipwrecks: 10 January 1954
Ship	State	Description
Nedjan	Sweden	The coaster sank in the Gulf of Bothnia with the loss of all sixteen crew.

=== 17 January ===
List of shipwrecks: 17 January 1954
Ship	State	Description
RFA Wave Victor	Royal Navy	The Wave-class tanker caught fire in the Bristol Channel and was abandoned by her crew. She was subsequently towed in to Swansea, Glamorgan. Subsequently repaired and returned to service.

=== 22 January ===
List of shipwrecks: 22 January 1954
Ship	State	Description
Ligovo	Soviet Union	The cargo ship collided with Karen Toft (Sweden) in the Kiel canal and sank.

=== 26 January ===
List of shipwrecks: 26 January 1954
Ship	State	Description
Wallace Rose	United Kingdom	The collier collided with Yvonne (Sweden) in the Thames estuary and sank with the loss of eight of her ten crew.

== February ==
=== 4 February ===
List of shipwrecks: 4 February 1954
Ship	State	Description
Kentbrook	United Kingdom	The coaster ran aground between Aldeburgh and Orfordness, Suffolk.

=== 6 February ===
List of shipwrecks: 6 February 1954
Ship	State	Description
Fernmoor	United Kingdom	The cargo ship ran aground on a reef in the South China Sea and sank.

=== 11 February ===
List of shipwrecks: 11 February 1954
Ship	State	Description
Annie K	United States	The 14-gross register ton, 35.4-foot (10.8 m) fishing vessel was destroyed by fire at the mouth of Pat Creek (56°20′30″N 132°20′20″W) in Southeast Alaska near Wrangell, Territory of Alaska.
Douro	Netherlands	The coaster collided in the Mediterranean with Drago (Spain) and sank.

=== 12 February ===
List of shipwrecks: 12 February 1954
Ship	State	Description
Daun Maru	Japan	The coaster sank off Honshu, Japan, with the loss of 16 of her 25 crew.
Mildred	United States	The 12-gross register ton, 50-foot (15.2 m) fishing vessel was destroyed by fire 1.5 nautical miles (2.8 km; 1.7 mi) northeast of East Point (56°23′00″N 132°24′20″W) on Woronkofski Island in the Alexander Archipelago in Southeast Alaska.

=== 13 February ===
List of shipwrecks: 13 February 1954
Ship	State	Description
Seablue	United Kingdom	The coaster struck the wreck of Empire Blessing (United Kingdom) and was holed. An attempt was made to beach her but she sank near Vlissingen, Netherlands. She was on a voyage from London to Antwerp, Belgium.

=== 19 February ===
List of shipwrecks: 19 February 1954
Ship	State	Description
Danubian	Panama	The cargo ship struck rocks at the Black Sea entrance to the Bosphorus and sank.

=== 24 February ===
List of shipwrecks: 24 February 1954
Ship	State	Description
Holger Danske	Denmark	The icebreaker collided with the ferry Broen (Denmark) in Nyborg Firth and ran aground. Two of her crew were killed.

=== 27 February ===
List of shipwrecks: 27 February 1954
Ship	State	Description
Crown No. 2	United States	The 1,295-gross register ton, 260-foot (79.2 m) scow was wrecked near Tree Point (54°48′15″N 130°55′45″W) in Southeast Alaska.

== March ==
=== 1 March ===
List of shipwrecks: 1 March 1954
Ship	State	Description
Captain Antonios K	Costa Rica	The cargo ship sank in the Mediterranean Sea (37°05′N 07°53′E). All 15 crew rescued by Nigaristan (United Kingdom).

=== 8 March ===
List of shipwrecks: 8 March 1954
Ship	State	Description
Zongdulak	Turkey	The cargo ship collided with Yolac Port (Turkey) in the Black Sea and sank. All crew were rescued by Yolac Port.

=== 10 March ===
List of shipwrecks: 10 March 1954
Ship	State	Description
Fenman	United Kingdom	The TID-class tug capsized and sank whilst assisting the berthing of Rudolf (Sweden) at Hull, Yorkshire. Three of her four crew were killed. Fenman was refloated on 3 April. Subsequently repaired and returned to service
Guildford	United Kingdom	The collier collided with another ship and then went aground at the mouth of the Tees. Salvage attempts abandoned in May and the wreck was blown up on 26 August 1955.

=== 18 March ===
List of shipwrecks: 18 March 1954
Ship	State	Description
Igloo	United States	The 17-gross register ton, 43.6-foot (13.3 m) fishing vessel was destroyed by fire at Juneau, Territory of Alaska.
Redwing	United States	The 6-gross register ton, 39.8-foot (12.1 m) motor passenger vessel was destroyed by fire at Juneau, Territory of Alaska.

=== 26 March ===
List of shipwrecks: 26 March 1954
Ship	State	Description
Guadalete	Spanish Navy	The minesweeper foundered in the Mediterranean Sea 20 nautical miles (37 km) east of Gibraltar with the loss of 33 of her 77 crew. The survivors were rescued by Potestas (Italy). HMS Superb (Royal Navy) assisted in the rescue operation.

=== 30 March ===
List of shipwrecks: 30 March 1954
Ship	State	Description
Empire Windrush	United Kingdom	The ocean liner sank in the Mediterranean Sea following an explosion and fire in the engine room on 29 March. All passengers and crew rescued apart from the four killed in the explosion.

== April ==
=== 7 April ===
List of shipwrecks: 7 April 1954
Ship	State	Description
Francescu	Italy	The cargo ship ran aground in the Scheldt, Belgium, and broke in two.

=== 15 April ===
List of shipwrecks: 15 April 1954
Ship	State	Description
Chelan	Canada	While towing a barge from Skagway, Territory of Alaska, to Vancouver, British Columbia, Canada, the Design 385 541-ton, 154-foot (46.9 m) motor fishing vessel, a former coastal freighter, sank in a storm off the entrance to Sumner Strait approximately four nautical miles (7.4 km; 4.6 mi) west of Cape Decision in Southeast Alaska with the loss of all 14 people aboard. Only two bodies were recovered. Her wreck was found in June 1979, but plans to salvage her were abandoned.
Unidentified barge	flag unknown	While under tow from Skagway, Territory of Alaska, to Vancouver, British Columbia, Canada, with a cargo of silver, lead, and zinc ore concentrates by the fishing vessel Chelan (Canada), the 240-foot (73.2 m) barge – formerly the passenger steamer SS Princess Mary (Canada) – was lost after Chelan sank off the entrance to Sumner Strait approximately four nautical miles (7.4 km; 4.6 mi) west of Cape Decision in Southeast Alaska.

=== 18 April ===
List of shipwrecks: 18 April 1954
Ship	State	Description
HM Minesweeper 1558	(United Kingdom) Royal Naval Volunteer Reserve	The minesweeper caught fire and sank in the English Channel off Ostend, Belgium. All 31 crew rescued by the steamship Phoenix (Netherlands) and Tunisie (France).

== May ==
=== 2 May ===
List of shipwrecks: 2 May 1954
Ship	State	Description
A F L 1654	United States	The 1,007-gross register ton barge was wrecked on the coast of Montague Island off the south-central coast of the Territory of Alaska.

=== 9 May ===
List of shipwrecks: 9 May 1954
Ship	State	Description
Sinbad	United States	The 9-gross register ton, 32.6-foot (9.9 m) fishing vessel sank at Gravina Point (60°37′30″N 146°15′00″W) in Prince William Sound on the south-central coast of the Territory of Alaska.

=== 10 May ===
List of shipwrecks: 10 May 1954
Ship	State	Description
Tatsuwa Maru	Japan	The cargo ship sprang a leak after striking a mine 500 nautical miles (930 km) west of Manila, Philippines in a typhoon, lost after issuing a distress call at 15°00′00″N 111°00′00″E. Presumed to have foundered with the loss of all 50 crew.

=== 11 May ===
List of shipwrecks: 11 May 1954
Ship	State	Description
Topaze	Belgium	The cargo ship was wrecked. Scrapped later that month.

=== 14 May ===
List of shipwrecks: 14 May 1954
Ship	State	Description
Harrington	United Kingdom	The tug capsized and sank at Swansea, Glamorgan, with the loss of two of her six crew.
Omar Babun	Honduras	The 1,275-ton cargo ship suffered cargo shift in a gale and was beached to prevent sinking on the Outer Banks, about three miles (4.8 km) north of the Chicamacomico Coast Guard Station in Rodanthe, North Carolina. The ship was refloated after the cargo was salvaged.

=== 15 May ===
List of shipwrecks: 15 May 1954
Ship	State	Description
Loyal	United States	The 11-gross register ton, 36.9-foot (11.2 m) fishing vessel was destroyed by fire in Kimshan Cove (57°41′20″N 136°07′00″W) in Southeast Alaska.

=== 17 May ===
List of shipwrecks: 17 May 1954
Ship	State	Description
Unknown junk	Republic of China Navy	Chinese Civil War: Dongji Islands Campaign: The junk was sunk by Nanchang, Guangzhou, Kaifeng, and Changsha (all People's Liberation Army Navy) near the Dongji Islands.

=== 18 May ===
List of shipwrecks: 18 May 1954
Ship	State	Description
Ruijin	People's Liberation Army Navy	Chinese Civil War: Dongji Islands Campaign: The auxiliary gunboat was sunk by Nationalist Republic P-47 Thunderbolt aircraft. 56 crewmen were killed, 40 wounded.

=== 22 May ===
List of shipwrecks: 22 May 1954
Ship	State	Description
Flamingo	United States	The 19-gross register ton, 45-foot (13.7 m) fishing vessel sank off the Outer Rocks (57°33′30″N 136°09′30″W) in Khaz Bay (57.5651°N 136.1091°W) in Southeast Alaska.

=== 25 May ===
List of shipwrecks: 25 May 1954
Ship	State	Description
HMS Curzon	Royal Navy	The Ton-class minesweeper ran aground at the entrance to Shoreham harbour, Sussex, England. She was refloated the next day.

=== 26 May ===
List of shipwrecks: 26 May 1954
Ship	State	Description
USS Bennington	United States Navy	An explosion on board killed 103 crewmen and injured 201 more while the aircraft carrier was in Narragansett Bay off the coast of Rhode Island.

=== 30 May ===
List of shipwrecks: 30 May 1954
Ship	State	Description
Pajtás	Hungary	The repaired ship in the 60s The passenger steamboat capsized and sunk on Lake Balaton, near the port of Balatonfüred. There were 178 passengers aboard the ship, 23 of whom died. Later, the ship was raised, and turned back to service.

== June ==
=== 4 June ===
List of shipwrecks: 4 June 1954
Ship	State	Description
Illenao	Panama	The Liberty ship ran aground at Bombay, India. She was later refloated but declared a constructive total loss and scrapped.

=== 27 June ===
List of shipwrecks: 27 June 1954
Ship	State	Description
Springfjord	United Kingdom	A CIA air attack in support of a Guatemalan military coup d'etat napalmed the cargo ship and destroyed her by fire at Puerto San José, Guatemala.

=== 28 June ===
List of shipwrecks: 28 June 1954
Ship	State	Description
Al	United States	The 8-gross register ton, 31.5-foot (9.6 m) or 35-foot (10.7 m) troller departed Sitka, Territory of Alaska, bound for Maid Island (56.8347°N 135.4633°W) in Southeast Alaska with one person aboard and was never heard from again. She was reported missing on 3 July.

== July ==
=== 3 July ===
List of shipwrecks: 3 July 1954
Ship	State	Description
Ruby	United States	The 14-gross register ton, 47.9-foot (14.6 m) fishing vessel was destroyed by fire in Tongass Narrows in Southeast Alaska near Ketchikan, Territory of Alaska.

=== 7 July ===
List of shipwrecks: 7 July 1954
Ship	State	Description
Lord Duncan	United Kingdom	The 86.9-foot (26.5 m) trawler sank at the coaling dock, north quay, Lowestoft, after coaling. Salvaged and laid up.

=== 9 July ===
List of shipwrecks: 9 July 1954
Ship	State	Description
GF 8	United States	The 8-gross register ton, 27.5-foot (8.4 m) fishing vessel was wrecked 2 nautical miles (3.7 km; 2.3 mi) north of Middle Bluff (58°24′20″N 157°31′15″W) on the Bristol Bay coast of the Territory of Alaska.

=== 10 July ===
List of shipwrecks: 10 July 1954
Ship	State	Description
Winabob	United States	The 22-gross register ton, 39.6-foot (12.1 m) fishing vessel sank in Cook Inlet southwest of Kalgin Island in the Territory of Alaska.

=== 12 July ===
List of shipwrecks: 12 July 1954
Ship	State	Description
San Mardeno	Panama	The cargo ship ran aground and sank off Saurashtra, India with the loss of her captain. The other 42 crew were rescued.

=== 15 July ===
List of shipwrecks: 15 July 1954
Ship	State	Description
Kathleen Ann	United States	The 11-gross register ton, 34.6-foot (10.5 m) fishing vessel was destroyed by fire near the entrance of Canoe Bay (55°34′N 161°18′W) in Pavlof Bay on the south coast of the Alaska Peninsula in the Territory of Alaska.
Pep	United States	The 9-gross register ton 32.2-foot (9.8 m) fishing vessel was destroyed by fire at False Cape (59°26′15″N 151°42′30″W) near Seldovia, Territory of Alaska.

=== 16 July ===
List of shipwrecks: 16 July 1954
Ship	State	Description
Donna Lee	United States	The 8-gross register ton, 29.2-foot (8.9 m) fishing vessel sank off Kalgin Island in Cook Inlet on the south-central coast of the Territory of Alaska.
Parnon	Greece	The cargo ship foundered in the Tyrrhenian Sea, near Naples, Italy. She was on a voyage from Marseille, France, to Eleusis, Greece.

=== 19 July ===
List of shipwrecks: 119 July 1954
Ship	State	Description
Sea Spray	United States	The 20-gross register ton, 43.6-foot (13.3 m) fishing vessel was destroyed by fire 70 nautical miles (130 km; 81 mi) north of Chignik, Territory of Alaska.

=== 21 July ===
List of shipwrecks: 21 July 1954
Ship	State	Description
Guinee	France	The cargo liner ran aground at Brook Point, Isle of Wight, United Kingdom. Later refloated.

=== 22 July ===
List of shipwrecks: 22 July 1954
Ship	State	Description
Derna	United Kingdom	The cargo ship, a sold off converted Mersey-class naval trawler, stranded on Niule reef outside Tanga, Tanganyika. She was refloated on 27 August and taken to Tanga and then to Mombasa, British East Africa.

=== 26 July ===
List of shipwrecks: 26 July 1954
Ship	State	Description
Traute Sarnow	West Germany	The coaster ran aground on Gurnard's Head. All crew and the ship's dog saved.

=== 27 July ===
List of shipwrecks: 27 July 1954
Ship	State	Description
Cressington Court	United Kingdom	The cargo ship collided with the Victory ship Marinero (Argentina) in the River Plate, Buenos Aires, Argentina.
Navarino	United Kingdom	The cargo ship ran aground in the River Plate, Buenos Aires, Argentina.
Rippingham Grange	United Kingdom	The cargo ship collided with Mormacvale (United States) in the River Plate, Buenos Aires, Argentina.

=== 31 July ===
List of shipwrecks: 31 July 1954
Ship	State	Description
Zingo	United States	The 11-gross register ton, 35.1-foot (10.7 m) fishing vessel was destroyed by fire at Kake in Southeast Alaska.

=== Unknown date ===
List of shipwrecks: Unknown date 1954
Ship	State	Description
Chios	Greece	The cargo ship sank in the period 4–11 July.

== August ==
=== 7 August ===
List of shipwrecks: 7 August 1954
Ship	State	Description
Stanwood	United States	The 78-gross register ton, 58.8-foot (17.9 m) motor cargo vessel was beached near Petersburg in Southeast Alaska after striking a log, and became a total loss.

=== 8 August ===
List of shipwrecks: 8 August 1954
Ship	State	Description
Spanker	United Kingdom	The cargo ship ran aground at Hook of Holland, Netherlands and was holed.

=== 13 August ===
List of shipwrecks: 13 August 1954
Ship	State	Description
Sally	United States	The 10-gross register ton, 33.2-foot (10.1 m) fishing vessel was destroyed by fire at Malina Bay (58°13′N 153°05′W) near Kodiak, Territory of Alaska.

=== 19 August ===
List of shipwrecks: 19 August 1954
Ship	State	Description
Applegarth	United Kingdom	The tug sank at Canning Dock, Liverpool, Lancashire.

=== 27 August ===
List of shipwrecks: 27 August 1954
Ship	State	Description
Lawrence P	United States	The 22-gross register ton, 42-foot (12.8 m) fishing vessel foundered 65 nautical miles (120 km; 75 mi) west of Yakutat, Territory of Alaska.

=== 28 August ===
List of shipwrecks: 28 August 1954
Ship	State	Description
Prince de Liege	Belgium	The cargo ship ran aground in the Niger Delta, Nigeria. Refloated 13 October 1954 with assistance from tug Poolzee (Netherlands).

=== 29 August ===
List of shipwrecks: 29 August 1954
Ship	State	Description
Donalourdes	Philippines	The cargo ship was driven ashore at Kowloon, Hong Kong in a typhoon.
Northern Princess	Panama	The cargo ship was driven ashore at Kowloon, Hong Kong in a typhoon.
Orelia	United Kingdom	The ore carrier ran aground at Port Talbot, Glamorgan. Later refloated.
Thorncombe	United Kingdom	The cargo ship was driven ashore at Kowloon, Hong Kong in a typhoon.

=== 30 August ===
List of shipwrecks: 30 August 1954
Ship	State	Description
Abeille IV	France	The tug collided with Atlantic (Panama) at Le Havre and sank with the loss of seven of her twelve crew.

=== 31 August ===
List of shipwrecks: 31 August 1954
Ship	State	Description
Albatross	United States	The 8-gross register ton, 30.6-foot (9.3 m) fishing vessel was destroyed by fire in Warren Channel (55.9308333°N 133.8325°W) in the Alexander Archipelago in Southeast Alaska between Warren Island and Cape Pole, Territory of Alaska.

=== Unknown date ===
List of shipwrecks: Unknown date in August 1954
Ship	State	Description
Trojan Star	United Kingdom	The cargo liner caught fire in the Indian Ocean off Colombo, Ceylon. Storm damage and engine failure also occurred and she was consequently withdrawn from service and scrapped.

== September ==
=== 9 September ===
List of shipwrecks: 9 September 1954
Ship	State	Description
Diajac	United States	The 10-gross register ton, 30.3-foot (9.2 m) motor cargo vessel was destroyed by fire in George Inlet on the south coast of Revillagigedo Island in the Alexander Archipelago in Southeast Alaska.
F. B. G.	Canada	Hurricane Edna: The schooner was driven ashore and wrecked at Kingsport, Nova Scotia.

=== 13 September ===
List of shipwrecks: 13 September 1954
Ship	State	Description
Serb	United Kingdom	The Thames barge sank 20 nautical miles (37 km) off Margate, Kent.

=== 14 September ===
List of shipwrecks: 14 September 1954
Ship	State	Description
Derna	United Kingdom	The cargo ship, a sold off converted Mersey-class naval trawler, sank at dock at Mtongwe, British East Africa under unknown causes. As she was already damaged from running aground 22 July, she was abandoned.

=== 15 September ===
List of shipwrecks: 15 September 1954
Ship	State	Description
Borde	United Kingdom	The cargo ship ran aground in the Firth of Clyde. Refloated on 19 September.

=== 16 September ===
List of shipwrecks: 16 September 1954
Ship	State	Description
Rainier II	United States	The 8-gross register ton, 28.4-foot (8.7 m) fishing vessel sank at Point Stenord in Clarence Strait in the Alexander Archipelago in Southeast Alaska.

=== 19 September ===
List of shipwrecks: 19 September 1954
Ship	State	Description
No. 532	People's Liberation Army Navy	Chinese Civil War: The Type 53 patrol boat was sunk by Nationalist Republic P-47 Thunderbolt aircraft. 14 crewmen were killed, 12 wounded.

=== 21 September ===
List of shipwrecks: 21 September 1954
Ship	State	Description
Avona	United States	The 15-gross register ton, 36.7-foot (11.2 m) fishing vessel sank northwest of Hive Island (59°53′N 149°22′W) at the entrance to Resurrection Bay on the south-central coast of the Territory of Alaska.

=== 22 September ===
List of shipwrecks: 22 September 1954
Ship	State	Description
Nordstjernen	Norway	The passenger ship struck a rock and sank off the Lofoten Islands with the loss of three lives. Over 200 passengers and crew were rescued.
Semiramis	Greece	The passenger ship ran aground at Brindisi, Italy.

=== 25 September ===
List of shipwrecks: 25 September 1954
Ship	State	Description
Oregon Wolf	United States	The 48-gross register ton, 58.6-foot (17.9 m) motor vessel sank in Frederick Sound in the Alexander Archipelago in Southeast Alaska approximately 3 nautical miles (5.6 km; 3.5 mi) east of Turnabout Island (57°07′30″N 133°58′40″W).

=== 26 September ===
List of shipwrecks: 26 September 1954
Ship	State	Description
Caprera	Italy	The cargo ship collided with Yung Fei (People's Republic of China) and another vessel ( United States Army) at Yokohama during Typhoon Marie.
Daiiki Maru	Japan	The cargo ship collided with the Pier at Kobe during Typhoon Marie and was severely damaged.
Daisetsu Maru	Japan	The passenger ship sank during Typhoon Marie.
Eastern	United Kingdom	The cargo ship was damaged during Typhoon Marie whilst on a voyage from Yokohama to Kure, Japan.
Iwai Maru	Japan	The cargo ship lost her hatch covers and her bridge was washed away off the Noto Peninsula during Typhoon Marie.
Fuji Maru	Japan	The cargo ship was reported to have a damaged hull and in a waterlogged state at Sakura Ma, Osaka during Typhoon Marie.
Georgios	Liberia	The cargo ship was driven against the pier at Hirohata, Japan during Typhoon Marie and was damaged.
Hatsuharu Maru	Japan	The ferry sank off Hokkaido during Typhoon Marie.
Hitaka Maru	Japan	The passenger ship sank in the Sea of Japan during Typhoon Marie.
Kitami Maru	Japan	The ferry sank in the Sea of Japan during Typhoon Marie.
Necati Pelhivan II	Turkey	The CHANT ran aground and sank near Mariehamn, Finland. She was on a voyage from Mariehamn to Istanbul.
Santhia	United Kingdom	The cargo ship was driven into the pier at Kobe, Japan during Typhoon Marie and was severely damaged.
Seikan Maru No. 11	Japan	The ferry sank in the Sea of Japan during Typhoon Marie.
Shinsei Maru No. 6	Japan	The cargo ship ran aground in Hakodate Bay during Typhoon Marie.
Tokachi Maru	Japan	The ferry sank during Typhoon Marie. Eight crew were rescued.
Tōya Maru	Japan	Tōya Maru The train ferry capsized in Tsugaru Strait during Typhoon Marie with the loss of a reported 1,139 lives, 150 people rescued.

=== 28 September ===
List of shipwrecks: 28 September 1954
Ship	State	Description
Isle of Thanet	United Kingdom	The ferry ran aground at Boulogne, France. Later refloated.

== October ==
=== 7 October ===
List of shipwrecks: 7 October 1954
Ship	State	Description
Jonge Jochem	Netherlands	The 93.83-foot (28.60 m) cutter sailed from Den Helder and sank with all hands on October 7, 1954, during a severe storm off the coast of Terschelling, Friesland, northwest of Den Helder. Intensive searches for the vessel began in 2023, using sonar scans and divers. The ship was discovered in October 2025.
La Pampa	United Kingdom	The cargo ship ran aground in the Scheldt, Belgium.
Mormackite	United States	The ore carrier capsized and sank off Virginia with the loss of 37 of her 48 crew.
Rikke Skou	Denmark	The cargo ship sank off Terschelling, Netherlands with the loss of twelve of her twenty crew.
Seahorse	United Kingdom	The coaster ran aground in the Scheldt, Belgium. Later refloated.

=== 8 October ===
List of shipwrecks: 8 October 1954
Ship	State	Description
Laura III	Italy	During an attempt to set a new world water speed record, the hydroplane went out of control on Lake Iseo in Italy at an estimated speed of 306 kilometres per hour (190 mph) and somersaulted. Its pilot, Mario Verga, was thrown from the boat and killed.

=== 9 October ===
List of shipwrecks: 9 October 1954
Ship	State	Description
Emma Bakke	Norway	The cargo ship was in the Atlantic Ocean when there was a boiler explosion and she was set on fire. The crew abandoned ship, and were rescued by Corrientes (Argentina). They were landed at Lisbon, Portugal. Two crew were killed in the explosion and the ship sank.
Jane Stove	Norway	The cargo ship suffered a fracture to her main deck whilst in the North Sea. She reached the Faroe Islands on 10 October.

=== 14 October ===
List of shipwrecks: 14 October 1954
Ship	State	Description
Prins Willem V	Netherlands	During a voyage from Milwaukee, Wisconsin, United States, carrying a mixed cargo, the 258-foot (79 m), 1,567-gross register ton cargo ship sank in 80 to 90 feet (24 to 27 m) of water in Lake Michigan 3 nautical miles (5.6 km; 3.5 mi) off Milwaukee Harbor at 43°01.539′N 087°48.528′W after colliding with the towing cables of the Sinclair Oil Corporation barge Barge 12 (United States), which was under tow by the tug Chicago (United States). The buoy tender USCGC Hollyhock ( United States Coast Guard) rescued Prins Willem V′s entire crew of 30.

=== 16 October ===
List of shipwrecks: 16 October 1954
Ship	State	Description
Omar Babun	Honduras	The 1,275-ton cargo ship was destroyed at dock by fire at Norfolk, Virginia.

=== 23 October ===
List of shipwrecks: 23 October 1954
Ship	State	Description
Platypus	United States	The 17-gross register ton, 35.2-foot (10.7 m) motor cargo vessel sank in Nelson Cove (60°05′40″N 142°48′30″W) off the south end of Gravina Island in the Alexander Archipelago in Southeast Alaska.

=== 25 October ===
List of shipwrecks: 25 October 1954
Ship	State	Description
Cervia	United Kingdom	The tug capsized and sank at Tilbury Docks whilst assisting to berth Arcadia (United Kingdom). Five of her nine crew were killed. Raised on 28 October, later repaired and returned to service.

=== 26 October ===
List of shipwrecks: 26 October 1954
Ship	State	Description
Faidherbe	Australia	The Warrior-type tug foundered off Cape Agulhas, Union of South Africa with loss of all hands. She was on a voyage from Cape Town, Union of South Africa to Fremantle, Western Australia.

=== 30 October ===
List of shipwrecks: 30 October 1954
Ship	State	Description
Hillman	United Kingdom	The TID-class tug capsized and sank at Grimsby, Lincolnshire whilsts assisting the fishing trawler Kirknes (United Kingdom). Hillman was refloated on 8 November. Subsequently repaired and returned to service as Dagger.

=== 31 October ===
List of shipwrecks: 31 October 1954
Ship	State	Description
Hillman	United Kingdom	The tug sank at Grimsby, Lincolnshire whilst towing the trawler Kirknes into Grimsby Docks. Four of her crew were killed.

== November ==
=== 2 November ===
List of shipwrecks: 2 November 1954
Ship	State	Description
Hinderton	United Kingdom	The ferry collided with the Victory ship Morgenster (Union of South Africa) in the River Mersey.

=== 12 November ===
List of shipwrecks: 12 November 1954
Ship	State	Description
Orkanger	United Kingdom	The tanker ran aground in the Clyde.
Scottish Hawk	United Kingdom	The newly launched tanker ran aground in the Clyde at Greenock, Renfrewshire.

=== 14 November ===
List of shipwrecks: 14 November 1954
Ship	State	Description
ROCS Tai Ping	Republic of China Navy	Chinese Civil War: The Tai Kang-class destroyer escort was torpedoed and sunk off the Tachen Islands by the motor torpedo boats No. 155, No. 156, No. 157, No. 158 (all People's Liberation Army Navy) with the loss of 23 of her crew of about 200.

=== 15 November ===
List of shipwrecks: 15 November 1954
Ship	State	Description
Barracuda	United States	The 17-gross register ton, 40-foot (12.2 m) fishing vessel sank in Southeast Alaska between Onslow Island (55°52′30″N 132°22′00″W) and Split Island (55.9506°N 132.4547°W).

=== 26 November ===
List of shipwrecks: 26 November 1954
Ship	State	Description
Carpo	Netherlands	The coaster sank off The Lizard, Cornwall, United Kingdom with the loss of all twelve crew.

=== 27 November ===
List of shipwrecks: 27 November 1954
Ship	State	Description
South Goodwin Lightship	United Kingdom	Capsized on the Goodwin Sands with the loss of all seven crewmen. The only survivor was a Ministry of Agriculture scientist who had been on board bird-watching.
World Concord	Liberia	The tanker broke in two in the Irish Sea. Both halves towed to the Clyde.

=== 28 November ===
List of shipwrecks: 28 November 1954
Ship	State	Description
KFC-8	United States	The 9-gross register ton, 30-foot (9.1 m) fishing vessel was destroyed by fire near Afognak, Territory of Alaska.

=== 29 November ===
List of shipwrecks: 29 November 1954
Ship	State	Description
Gustav	Finland	The coaster was reported to be listing severely 20 nautical miles (37 km) north east of the Channel Islands.

=== 30 November ===
List of shipwrecks: 30 November 1954
Ship	State	Description
Tresillian	United Kingdom	The cargo ship foundered in St George's Channel, 44 nautical miles (81 km) off Cork, Ireland with the loss of 24 of her 40 crew. Sixteen survivors were rescued by Liparus (United Kingdom) and transferred to LÉ Maev (Irish Naval Service) and landed at Cobh. Tresillian was on a voyage from Sorel, Quebec, Canada to Avonmouth, Somerset.

=== Unknown date ===
List of shipwrecks: Unknown November 1954
Ship	State	Description
Exportador Segundo	Portugal	The 130-foot (40 m), 278.44-ton trawler was last reported between Cap Juby and Cap Blanc on 1 November. The vessel failed to arrive at Lisbon as scheduled on 5 November. Lost with all 23 hands.

== December ==
=== 12 December ===
List of shipwrecks: 12 December 1954
Ship	State	Description
Western Sun	United States	The 79-gross register ton, 68.7-foot (20.9 m) fishing vessel was stranded and lost near the mouth of Kah Sheets Bay (56°31′N 133°06′W) at the south end of Duncan Canal in the Alexander Archipelago in Southeast Alaska.

=== 15 December ===
List of shipwrecks: 15 December 1954
Ship	State	Description
HMS Talent	Royal Navy	The T-class submarine was swept out of her dock at HMNB Chatham when a caisson collapsed. She ended up aground in the Medway. Four people were killed. Later repaired and returned to service.

=== 18 December ===
List of shipwrecks: 18 December 1954
Ship	State	Description
Hispania	Sweden	Struck a rock in the Sound of Mull and sank with the loss of her captain.

=== 20 December ===
List of shipwrecks: 20 December 1954
Ship	State	Description
Parks No. 4	United States	The 7-gross register ton, 29.5-foot (9.0 m) fishing vessel was wrecked at Harriet Point (57°42′30″N 153°55′30″W) in Spiridon Bay on the Shelikof Strait coast of Kodiak Island.

=== 21 December ===
List of shipwrecks: 21 December 1954
Ship	State	Description
Côte d'Azur	France	The ferry collided with the jetty at Calais and was disabled. She then ran aground outside the harbour. Later refloated and escorted into port.
Gerontas	Panama	The Liberty ship was driven onto a sandbank at Cardross, Dunbartonshire, United Kingdom.
Henri Deweert	Belgium	Last communication was a message sent while the ship was in the North Sea 100 nautical miles (190 km) north north east of Texel, North Holland, Netherlands (54°18′45″N 4°29′45″E). Foundered with loss of all six hands in the night of 21–22 December.
Maravia	United Kingdom	The coaster caught fire, capsized and sank at Marseille, France. All twenty crew escaped.
Neld	United States	The 10-gross register ton, 34.1-foot (10.4 m) fishing vessel sank on the beach on the Glass Peninsula in Southeast Alaska, 40 nautical miles (74 km; 46 mi) south of Juneau, Territory of Alaska.

=== 22 December ===
List of shipwrecks: 22 December 1954
Ship	State	Description
Katingo	Panama	Katingo The Liberty ship was driven ashore at Bergen-op-Zoom, Zeeland, Netherlands. Her crew were rescued. She was on a voyage from Rotterdam, South Holland, Netherlands to Hamburg, West Germany. She was refloated on 19 February 1955. Although declared a constructive total loss, she was sold, repaired and returned to service.

=== 23 December ===
List of shipwrecks: 23 December 1954
Ship	State	Description
Lupo	Portugal	The cargo ship ran aground at Swanbridge, Glamorgan, United Kingdom.

=== 31 December ===
List of shipwrecks: 31 December 1954
Ship	State	Description
Evelyn Rose	United Kingdom	The sold off Mersey-class naval trawler stranded 15 yards (14 m) from the Ardtornish Lighthouse, Morven, in the Sound of Mull. She slipped off the rocks and quickly sank (56°31′09″N 11°05′45″W) with only her Mate and a deckhand surviving. Twelve crew were killed including her skipper.
World Peace	Liberia	The tanker collided with the El Ferdan Railway Bridge, Suez Canal, Ismailia, Egypt. The canal was blocked as part of the bridge ended up across the deck of World Peace.

=== Unknown date ===
List of shipwrecks: Unknown date in December 1954
Ship	State	Description
Marvia	Malta	The cargo ship caught fire and capsized at Marseille, Bouches-du-Rhône, France. Although refloated, she was declared a constructive total loss and was scrapped.

== Unknown date ==
List of shipwrecks: Unknown date 1954
Ship	State	Description
ROCS Lu Shan	Republic of China Navy	The landing ship was wrecked c. 1954–1955.
Valles	flag unknown	The USSB Type 1023 cargo ship ran aground near Makassar sometime in 1954, but was salvaged soon after.
