= List of Empire ships (E) =

== Suffix beginning with E ==
=== Empire Eagle ===
Empire Eagle was a 5,775 GRT cargo ship which was built by the Ames Shipbuilding and Dry Dock Company, Seattle, United States. Completed in 1919 as West Islip for the United States Shipping Board (USSB). To Oceanic & Oriental Steam Navigation Co, San Francisco in 1928 and renamed Golden Rod. To Williams Steamship Co Inc, New York in 1935 and renamed Willhilo. To American-Hawaiian Steamship Co in 1937 and renamed Indianan. To Ministry of Supply (MoS) in 1940 and renamed Empire Eagle. To Norwegian Government in 1942 and renamed Norjerv. Sunk in August 1944 as a blockship at Juno Beach, Calvados, France. Raised in 1949. Broke in two on 3 June 1949 while under tow by tugs Tradesman and Rifleman. Both sections sank.

=== Empire Earl ===
Empire Earl was a 7,359 GRT cargo ship which was built by William Doxford & Sons Ltd, Sunderland. Launched on 8 December 1943 and completed in May 1944. Sold in 1945 to United British Steamship Co Ltd and renamed Cressington Court. Operated under the management of Haldin & Co Ltd. Sold in 1958 to Gibbs & Co Ltd, Newport, Monmouthshire and renamed East Wales. Sold in 1966 to Dalkeith Shipping Co Ltd, Dalkeith and renamed Universal Skipper. Operated under the management of International Steamship Co Ltd, Hong Kong. Scrapped in November 1970 in Whampoa, Hong Kong.

=== Empire Eddystone ===
Empire Eddystone was a 7,318 GRT cargo ship which was built by William Gray & Co Ltd, West Hartlepool, Co Durham. Launched on 11 May 1945 and completed in July 1945. Sold in 1947 to Aegean Shipping Co Ltd and renamed Winston Churchill. Operated under the management of SG Embiricos Ltd, London. Sold in 1952 to Fratelli D'Amico, Italy and renamed Marialaura. Scrapped in May 1966 in Trieste, Italy.

=== Empire Eden ===
Empire Eden was a 1,923 GRT cargo ship which was built by Deutsche Werft, Hamburg. Launched in 1944 as Kattenturm for Hansa Line, Bremen. Seized on 1 May 1945 as a war prize as Brunsbüttel, Germany. To Ministry of War Transport (MoWT) and renamed Empire Eden. Sold in 1947 to Currie Line Ltd, Leith and renamed Lowland. Sold in 1959 to Poseidon Shipping Co, Bermuda and renamed Mary Enid. Sold in 1963 to Delphic Shipping Co, Greece, and renamed Stelianos. Sold in 1964 to Marynik Compagnia Navigazione, Greece, and renamed Marynik. Sold in 1967 to Euripides Shipping Co, Hong Kong, and renamed Euripides. Operated under the management of P D Marchessini & Co. Scrapped in July 1969 in Hong Kong.

=== Empire Edgehill ===
Empire Edgehill was an 8,097 GRT tanker which was built by Harland & Wolff Ltd, Govan. Launched on 4 April 1946 as Empire Edgehill and completed in August 1946 as RFA Wave Chief for the Royal Fleet Auxiliary. Arrived on 13 November 1974 at Inverkeithing for scrapping.

=== Empire Edward ===
Empire Edward was a 235 GRT tug which was built by A Hall & Co Ltd, Aberdeen. Launched on 27 August 1942 as Empire Ned and completed in November 1942. Renamed Empire Edward in 1945. To the Admiralty in 1947 and renamed Energetic in 1956. Sold in 1965 to Tsavliris Salvage & Towage Ltd, Greece, and renamed Nisos Lefkos. Sold in 1975 to Maritime Commercial Enterprises Ltd, Greece, and renamed Kronos. Struck on 23 March 1978 by cruise ship Romanza while berthed at Piraeus, Greece. Declared a constructive total loss and scrapped in March 1979 at Perama, Greece.

=== Empire Egret ===
Empire Egret was a 7,248 GRT cargo ship which was built by Newport News Shipbuilding & Dry Dock Co. Completed in October 1939 as Nightingale for Grace Lines Inc. To MoWT in 1941 and renamed Empire Egret. To United States Maritime Commission (USMC) in 1942 and renamed Nightingale. To Grace Lines Inc. later that year and renamed Santa Isabel. Converted in 1943 by Brewer Dockyard Co, New York to a troopship, completed in January 1944. To USMC in 1946 and renamed Guiding Star. Scrapped in June 1973 at Brownsville, Texas.

=== Empire Elaine ===
Empire Elaine was a 7,513 GRT (10,300 DWT) heavy lift ship which was built by Vickers-Armstrongs Ltd, Barrow in Furness. Launched on 30 July 1942 and completed in November 1942. Sold in 1947 to Marine Enterprises Ltd and renamed John Lyras. Operated under the management of Lyras & Lemos Bros Ltd, London. Sold in 1959 to Viking Shipping Corporation, Panama. Operated under the management of Lyras Bros Ltd, London. Sold in 1970 to New Frontier Shipping Co Inc, Panama, and renamed Boundary. Operated under the management of Gersigny & Co (Pty) Ltd, Durban, South Africa. Arrived in September 1972 at Kaohsiung, Taiwan for scrapping.

=== Empire Eland ===
Empire Eland was a 5,620 GRT cargo ship which was built by the Long Beach Shipbuilding Company, Long Beach, California. Completed in 1920 as West Kedron for USSB. To MoS in 1940 and renamed Empire Eland. Torpedoed on 15 September 1941 and sunk by U-94 in the Atlantic, approximate position 54°00′N 28°00′W.

=== Empire Elgar ===
Empire Elgar was a 2,847 GRT cargo ship which was built by William Gray & Co Ltd, West Hartlepool. Launched on 17 February 1942 and completed in April 1942. Sold in 1947 to Dover Navigation Co Ltd, London, and renamed Sea Minstrel. Sold in 1951 to Drayton Steamship Co Ltd, Newcastle upon Tyne and renamed Marandellas. Sold in 1956 to I Jansen, Norway, and renamed Edward Jansen. Sold in 1960 to Skibs A/S Katlander, Norway, and renamed Slitan. Sold in 1961 to Navigation Maritime Bulgare and renamed Pirin. Arrived on 1 October 1965 at Split, Yugoslavia for scrapping.

=== Empire Elinor ===
Empire Elinor was a 244 GRT tug which was built by Henry Scarr Ltd, Hessle, Yorkshire. Launched on 4 October 1944 and completed in November 1944. Sold in 1946 to the French Government and renamed Vigoureaux. Sold in 1951 to Les Abeilles Compagnie des Remorquage et Sauvignon, Le Havre and renamed Abeille No 24. Sold in 1964 to Rim. Laziali SpA, Italy and renamed Labor. Scrapped in October 1985 in Naples, Italy.

=== Empire Elk ===
Empire Elk was a 4,748 GRT cargo ship which was built by Todd Drydock and Construction Company, Tacoma, Washington. Launched in 1920 as Rotarian for USSB. To Grace Steamship Company, New York in 1923 and renamed Condor. To MoS in 1940 and renamed Empire Elk. To the Norwegian Government in 1942 and renamed Norvarg. Sold in 1946 to Wallem & Co, Shanghai, China and renamed Nan Chiang. Sold in 1950 to Great Northern Shipping Co Ltd, Hong Kong, and renamed Northern Glow. Sold in 1959 to the Chinese Government and renamed Hoping Ssu Shi Liu. Removed from shipping registers in 1971.

=== Empire Ely ===
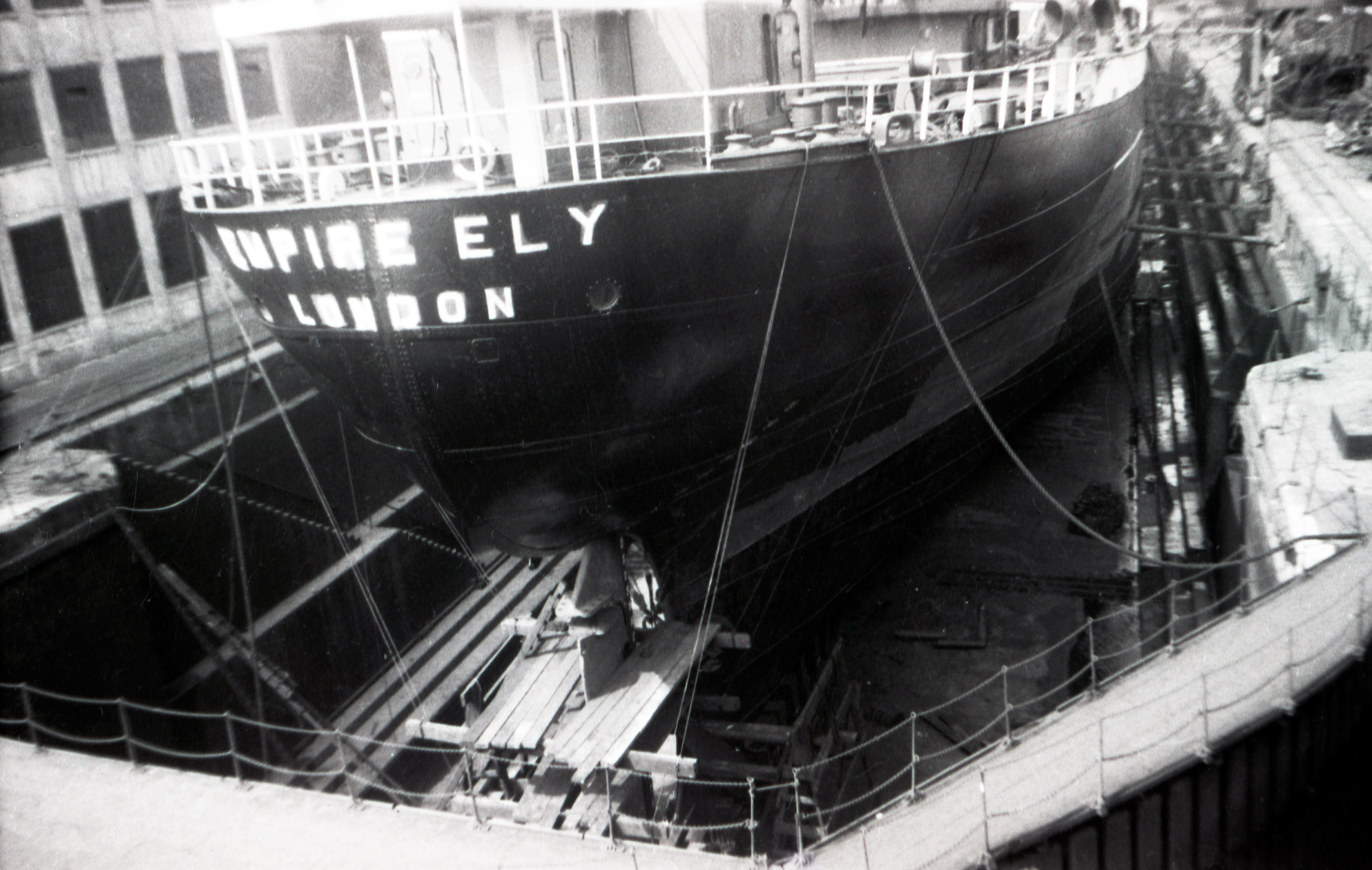
Empire Ely in drydock.

Empire Ely was a 6,112 GRT cargo ship which was built by Lübecker Flenderwerke AG, Lübeck. Launched in 1944 as Griefswald for Norddeutscher Lloyd. Seized in May 1945 in an incomplete state at Lübeck. Completed in 1948 for MoWT and renamed Empire Ely. in 1949, Sir R Ropner & Sons Ltd were given the option to purchase the ship. Although this was considered and the name Swiftpool allocated, the purchase was not proceeded with. Sold in 1954 to Mariblanca Navigation SA, Liberia and renamed Maribella. Sold in 1955 to F A Detjen, Germany and renamed Ganges. Sold in 1959 to Compagnia de Navigazione Andria, Greece and renamed Eleni. On 5 September 1971 she was in collision with Prinsesse Ragnhild in the Bay of Kiel. Proceeded to Gdynia, Poland under her own power. Declared an economic write-off and arrived in April 1972 at Santander, Spain for scrapping.

=== Empire Emerald ===
Empire Emerald was an 8,032 GRT tanker which was built by Furness Shipbuilding Co Ltd, Haverton Hill-on-Tees. Launched on 26 August 1941 and completed in October 1941. Sold in 1946 to Lobitos Oilfields Ltd and renamed El Gallo. Operated under the management of C T Bowring & Co Ltd. Arrived on 5 February 1959 at Briton Ferry, West Glamorgan for scrapping.

=== Empire Endurance ===
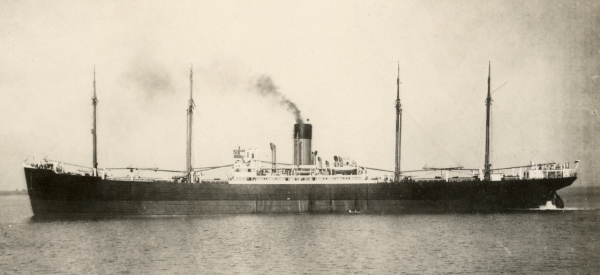
Alster

Empire Endurance was an 8,570 GRT (12,000 DWT) cargo ship which was built by Deutsche Werft, Hamburg. Launched in 1928 as Alster for Norddeutscher Lloyd. Captured on 10 April 1940 by HMS Icarus off Vestfjord, Norway. To MoWT and renamed Empire Endurance. Torpedoed and sunk on 20 April 1941 by U-73 south west of Rockall (53°05′N 23°14′W).

=== Empire Energy ===
Empire Energy was a 6,548 GRT cargo ship which was built by Neptun AG, Rostock. Launched in 1923 as Grete. Sold in 1934 to Achille Lauro & Co, Naples and renamed Gabbiano. Seized on 10 June 1940 at Liverpool. To MoWT and renamed Empire Energy. Ran aground on 5 November 1941 at Big Brook, 11 nautical miles (20 km) west of Cape Norman, Newfoundland. Declared a total loss.

=== Empire Engineer ===
Empire Engineer was a 5,358 GRT cargo ship which was built by Canadian Vickers Ltd, Montreal, Quebec, Canada. Launched in 1921 as Canadian Commander. Sold in 1932 to Achille Lauro & Co, Naples and renamed Gioacchino Lauro. Seized on 10 June 1940 at Hartlepool. To MoWT and renamed Empire Engineer. Torpedoed on 2 February 1943 and sunk by U-123 in the Atlantic (Approximately 54°00′N 34°00′W).

=== Empire Ensign ===
Empire Ensign was a 3,750 GRT tanker which was built in 1945 by J L Thompson & Sons Ltd, Sunderland. Sold in 1947 to the British Tanker Co Ltd and renamed British Drummer. Sold in 1957 to A Blystad, Norway, and renamed Anella. Sold in 1958 to Bucha, Godager & Co, Norway and renamed Norse Commander. Suffered boiler defects in 1966, arriving on 6 September 1966 at Singapore undertow. Repairs uneconomic so she was sold and scrapped in November 1966 in Singapore.

=== Empire Envoy ===
Empire Envoy was a 7,046 GRT cargo ship which was built by Short Brothers Ltd, Sunderland. Launched on 25 September 1942 and completed in December 1942. Sold in 1946 to Thompson Steam Shipping Co Ltd, London, and renamed Cheltenham. Sold in 1952 to Buries, Markes Ltd, London and renamed La Orilla. Sold in 1955 to Skiold & Lundberg A/B, Stockholm and renamed Stallberg. Sold in 1962 to Paulins Rederier, Finland and renamed Verna Paulin. Arrived on 19 July 1969 at Bruges for scrapping.

=== Empire Estuary ===
Empire Estuary was a 319 GRT coaster which was built as Fiddown by Goole Shipbuilding & Repairing Co Ltd, Goole. Launched on 9 May 1940 and completed in July 1940 for S Morris Ltd, Dublin. On 29 November 1941 she was run down and sunk by HMS Campbelltown in the River Mersey. She was beached at Tranmere, Cheshire on 7 July 1942 and later refloated and repaired. To MoWT and renamed Empire Estuary. Sold in 1946 to E J & W Goldsmith Ltd, London, and renamed Goldfawn. Sold in 1952 to Springwell Shipping Co Ltd and renamed Creekdawn. Sold in 1954 to J Tyrell, Ireland and renamed Murell. Scrapped in March 1972 in the Republic of Ireland.

=== Empire Ethelbert ===
Empire Ethelbert was a 7,843 GRT heavy lift ship which was built by Vickers-Armstrongs Ltd, Newcastle upon Tyne. Launched on 14 August 1946 and completed in January 1947 as Beljeanne for Belships Co Ltd. Operated under the management of C Smith & Co, Norway. Sold in 1964 to Bacong Shipping Co SA, Panama, and renamed Southern Cross. Operated under the management of Southern Industrial Projects Inc, Philippines. Sold in 1968 to Peoples Bank & Trust Co, Philippines and renamed Virginia Second. Operated under the management of M M Shipping Lines Inc, Philippines. Arrived in January 1969 at Aioi, Japan for scrapping.

=== Empire Ettrick ===
Empire Ettrick was a 4,622 GRT cargo ship which was built by Deutsche Werft, Hamburg. Launched in 1939 as Bukarest for Deutsche Levant Line, Hamburg. Seized in May 1945 at Kiel. To MoWT and renamed Empire Ettrick. Allocated in 1946 to Norway, to Norwegian Government and renamed Bremnes. Sold in 1947 to Bergen Steamship Co, Norway, and renamed Clio. Sold in 1963 to E T Kolintzas & Maltakis, Greece, and renamed Panorea. Scrapped in 1974 in Kaohsiung, Taiwan.

=== Empire Eve ===
Empire Eve was a 5,979 GRT CAM ship which was built by William Pickersgill & Sons Ltd, Sunderland. Launched on 26 April 1941 and completed in June 1941. Torpedoed on 18 May 1943 and sunk by U-414 west of Algiers (36°37′N 00°46′E)

=== Empire Eveleen ===
Empire Eveleen was a 502 GRT coaster which was built by Ardrossan Dockyard Co Ltd, Ardrossan, Ayrshire. Launched in 1920 as Eveleen for J Mulligan & Co Ltd. Collided on 7 November 1942 with SS Orchy off Grey Point, Belfast Lough, and sank. Refloated on 9 November 1943 but buckled across the deck. Beached at Ballyholme Bay. Later refloated and towed to Belfast for repairs. To MoWT in 1944 and renamed Empire Eveleen. To J Mulligan & Co Ltd in 1946 and renamed Eveleen. Scrapped in 1957 in Troon, Ayrshire.

=== Empire Evenlode ===
Empire Evenlode was a 10,254 GRT cargo ship which was built by Scotts Shipbuilding & Engineering Co Ltd, Greenock. Launched in 1912 as Talthybius for A Holt & Co Ltd, Liverpool. Sank on 3 February 1942 in an enemy air raid at Singapore. Salvaged by Japanese and repaired. Renamed Taruyasu Maru. Hit a mine off Sado Island, Japan sometime after 30 June 1945. Salvaged by British and repaired. To MoWT and renamed Empire Evenlode. The return voyage to the UK protracted due to her poor condition. Started on 1 December 1945 and completed on 8 May 1946. Scrapped in 1949 at Briton Ferry.

=== Empire Evesham ===
Empire Evesham was an 8,138 GRT tanker which was built by Furness Shipbuilding Co Ltd, Haverton Hill-on-Tees. Launched on 17 January 1946 and completed in April 1946. To Royal Fleet Auxiliary in February 1947 and renamed RFA Wave Ruler. Hulked at Gan, Maldive Islands to serve aircraft at RAF Gan, replacing RFA Wave Victor. Sold in January 1976 to Straits Engineers Contracting Private Ltd, Singapore for demolition, towed to Singapore. Sold in 1977 to a shipbreaker and scrapped in Taiwan.

=== Empire Exe ===
Empire Exe was a 2,371 GRT cargo ship which was built by Howaldtswerke, Kiel. Launched in 1921 as Possehl for Lübeck Line, Lübeck. Seized in May 1945 at Lübeck, to MoWT and renamed Empire Exe. Allocated in 1947 to Greece. To Greek Government and renamed Hermoupolis. Sold in 1948 to T J Lavangras & Co, Greece, used as a depot ship. Sold in 1966 to P Perdikis, Greece, and renamed Pilion. Sold in 1967 to Tina Shipping Co, Cyprus and renamed Nigma. Laid up in November 1967 at Aden, South Yemen with boiler damage. Arrived under tow at Karachi, Pakistan in November 1969 for scrapping.

=== Empire Explorer ===
Empire Explorer was a 5,985 GRT cargo liner which was built by Swan, Hunter and Wigham Richardson Ltd, Newcastle upon Tyne. Launched in 1925 as Inanda for T & J Harrison, Liverpool. Hired in July 1940 by the Royal Navy for use as an ocean boarding vessel, but sunk on 7 September 1940 in an air raid at London Docks. Salvaged and rebuilt as a cargo ship. To MoWT in 1941 and renamed Empire Explorer. Torpedoed on 9 July 1942 and sunk by U-575 off the West Indies (11°40′N 60°55′W).

== See also ==
The above entries give a precis of each ship's history. For a fuller account see the linked articles.

== Sources ==
- Mitchell, W H; Sawyer, L A (1990). The Empire Ships (Second ed.). London, New York, Hamburg, Hong Kong: Lloyd's of London Press Ltd. ISBN 1-85044-275-4.
