= Pelion (disambiguation) =

Pelion or Pelium may refer to:

- Pelion, a mountain range in Thessaly, Greece
- 49036 Pelion, an asteroid named after the mountain
- Pelion (Illyria), a fortified settlement in the borderlands of Illyria and Macedonia
- Pelion (Thessaly), a city in ancient Thessaly, Greece
- Pelion, South Carolina, United States
- Pelion Mountain, mountain in Canada
- Pelion Range, mountain in Tasmania, Australia
- SS Pilion, a ship
