= Beljeanne =

Two ships operated by Belships were named Beljeanne:

- MV Beljeanne, in service 1926–37
- SS Beljeanne, in service 1947–64
