= USCGC Hollyhock =

Two United States Coast Guard cutters have been named Hollyhock:

- USCGC Hollyhock (WLB-214) is a Juniper-class, 225-foot (69 m) seagoing buoy tender of the United States Coast Guard. She was named for USCGC Hollyhock (WAGL-220).
- USCGC Hollyhock (WAGL-220) was built in 1937 and scrapped in 1982. She was stationed in Sturgeon Bay, Wisconsin, Detroit, Michigan, and Miami, Florida. She took part in the search and rescue effort when SS Carl D. Bradley sank in Lake Michigan in 1958.
