= Possehl =

Possehl may refer to:

- German: Possehl, a group of industrial companies
- German: Possehl-Stiftung, a foundation created from the estate of Emil Possehl
- SS Possehl, a German cargo ship in service 1921–45
- German: Possehlstraße, a street in Lübeck, Germany

Possehl is a surname and may refer to:

- Gregory Possehl, an American professor of anthropology
- German: Emil Possehl (1850–1919), German businessman, entrepreneur and patron of the arts
- German: Julian Possehl (* 1992), German handball player
- Lou Possehl, an American baseball player
- German: Lu Possehl (* 1943), German painter and steel sculptor
- German: Trude Possehl (1900–1994), German actress
