= Corrientes (disambiguation) =

Corrientes is a city in Argentina.

Corrientes (currents in the Spanish language) may also refer to:

- Corrientes Province, including the city of Corrientes
- Corriente River, in this province
- Avenida Corrientes in Buenos Aires, Argentina
- Corrientes (Buenos Aires Underground), a railway station
- Cabo Corrientes (municipality), a municipality in Jalisco, Mexico
- Cabo Corrientes, Chocó, a cape on the Pacific coast of Colombia
- Cabo Corrientes, Cuba, a cape in the extreme west of Cuba
- Cabo Corrientes, Jalisco, a cape in Jalisco, Mexico
- Cabo Corrientes, Mar del Plata, a cape in Argentina
- Carysfort, Falkland Islands, known as Cabo Corrientes in Spanish
- SS Corrientes, two Donaldson Line ships with this name
