= MV Prins Willem V =

Shipwreck in Lake Michigan, Wisconsin, United States

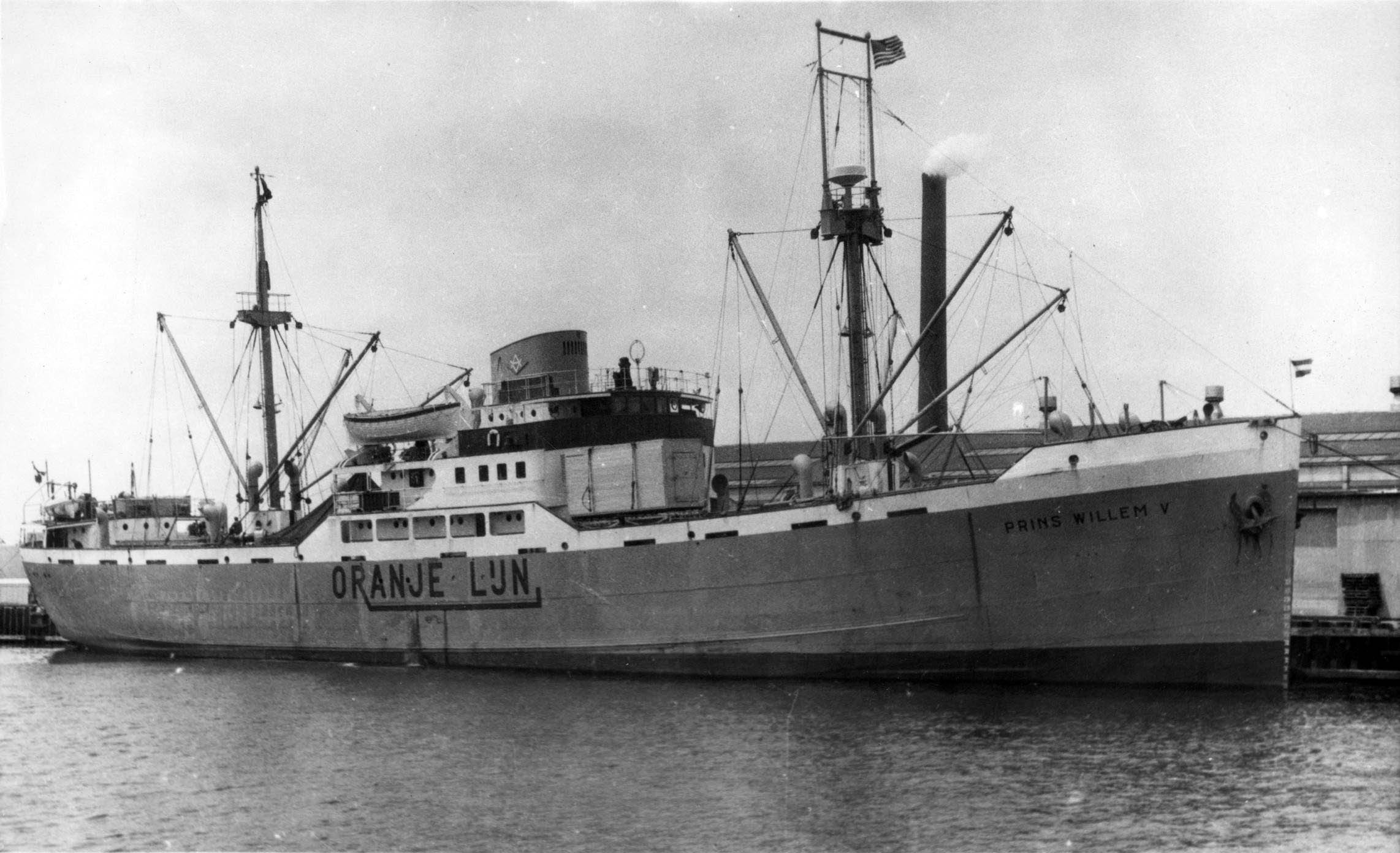

History

Netherlands
- Name: Prins Willem V
- Operator: Oranje Lijn (N.V. Maatschappij Zeetransport)
- Builder: N.V. Scheepsbouwwerf & Machinefabriek "De Merwede" v/h Van Vliet & Co.
- Yard number: 441
- Laid down: May 8, 1940
- Launched: March 9, 1943
- Completed: January 7, 1949
- In service: 1949
- Out of service: 1954
- Identification: Official Number: 7318 Z ROTT 1948; Callsign: PGWF
- Fate: Sank following a collision on Lake Michigan October 14, 1954

General characteristics
- Type: General cargo ship
- Tonnage: 1,567 GRT
- Length: 258 ft (79 m)
- Beam: 42.1 ft (12.8 m)
- Draught: 18 ft (5.5 m)
- Depth: 14.7 ft (4.5 m)
- Decks: 2 (shelterdeck)
- Installed power: 1,500 bhp (1,100 kW), 5-cylinder Stork diesel engine
- Propulsion: Single screw
- Speed: 12 knots (22 km/h; 14 mph)
- Capacity: 177,710 ft^{3} (5,032 m^{3}) (grain)
- Crew: 30

MV Prins Willem V was a Dutch general cargo motor vessel built in 1949 and operated by the Oranje Lijn (N.V. Maatschappij Zeetransport). She sank on October 14, 1954, after colliding with an unlit oil barge in tow off Milwaukee, Wisconsin, in Lake Michigan. The wreck rests on the lakebed in about 80 feet (24 m) of water and is one of the most visited dive sites in the state.

== Description ==
Prins Willem V was built as a St. Lawrence canal-sized general cargo vessel at the De Merwede shipyard in Hardinxveld, Netherlands. She measured 258 feet (79 m) in length with a beam of 42.1 feet (12.8 m) and a draught of 18 feet (5.5 m). The steel-hulled ship had a gross register tonnage of 1,567 tons and net register tonnage of 812 tons. Her propulsion came from a five-cylinder two-stroke diesel engine built by Stork, delivering 1,500 brake horsepower (1,100 kW) to a single screw, giving her a service speed of 12 knots (22 km/h; 14 mph). She had a shelterdeck layout with two decks and a total cargo volume of over 177,000 cubic feet (5,000 m^{3}) (grain capacity).

== History ==
Construction of Prins Willem V began on May 8, 1940, but was interrupted by the German invasion of the Netherlands in World War II. The incomplete hull was launched in 1943 and later scuttled by the Germans in 1944 to block the Nieuwe Waterweg near Maassluis. After the war, the wreck was raised by the Dutch government and completed in 1949.

The vessel was operated by Oranje Lijn (Oranje Line) out of Rotterdam, and designed for trade between European ports and the Great Lakes. She typically carried mixed cargoes including industrial goods, food products, and manufactured items. During her final voyage, she was outbound from Milwaukee, Wisconsin, to Sarnia, Ontario, Canada, and eventually Rotterdam with a full load of general cargo.

== Sinking ==
On October 14, 1954, around 19:16 local time, Prins Willem V collided with the unlit and unmanned oil barge Sinclair N.12, which was under tow by the tugboat Chicago. The incident occurred about three nautical miles (5.6 km; 3.5 mi) from the Milwaukee harbor breakwater in fair weather but under heavy overcast conditions. The collision tore 20-by-8-foot (6.1 by 2.4 m) hole in the ship’s starboard side near the engine room. All 30 crew members were safely evacuated by USCGC Hollyhock before the vessel sank at approximately 20:30. A United States Coast Guard inquiry later found both captains partly at fault. Legal action by the Oranje Line sought $2 million in damages against Sinclair Refining Company.

== The wreck ==
The wreck of Prins Willem V lies in 69 feet (21 m) of water at coordinates 43°01.539′N 87°48.528′W. The vessel rests on her starboard side and remains largely intact. Cargo items such as jukeboxes, canned goods, TV tubes, and outboard motors remain visible in the holds. The site has been a popular destination for recreational divers since the 1960s.

Notably, Milwaukee diver and underwater filmmaker Max Gene Nohl acquired ownership of the wreck after winning a bid to remove navigational obstructions. Despite plans to raise and restore the ship, only minimal salvage work was completed before Nohl's death in 1960. The wreck has since changed hands several times, including a failed attempt by the Fireguard & General Fire Extinguisher Company to turn the vessel into a floating showroom.

The wreck is protected under the Abandoned Shipwreck Act and managed by the Wisconsin Historical Society.

== See also ==
- List of shipwrecks in the Great Lakes
