= USS Stagbush =

Tender of the United States Navy

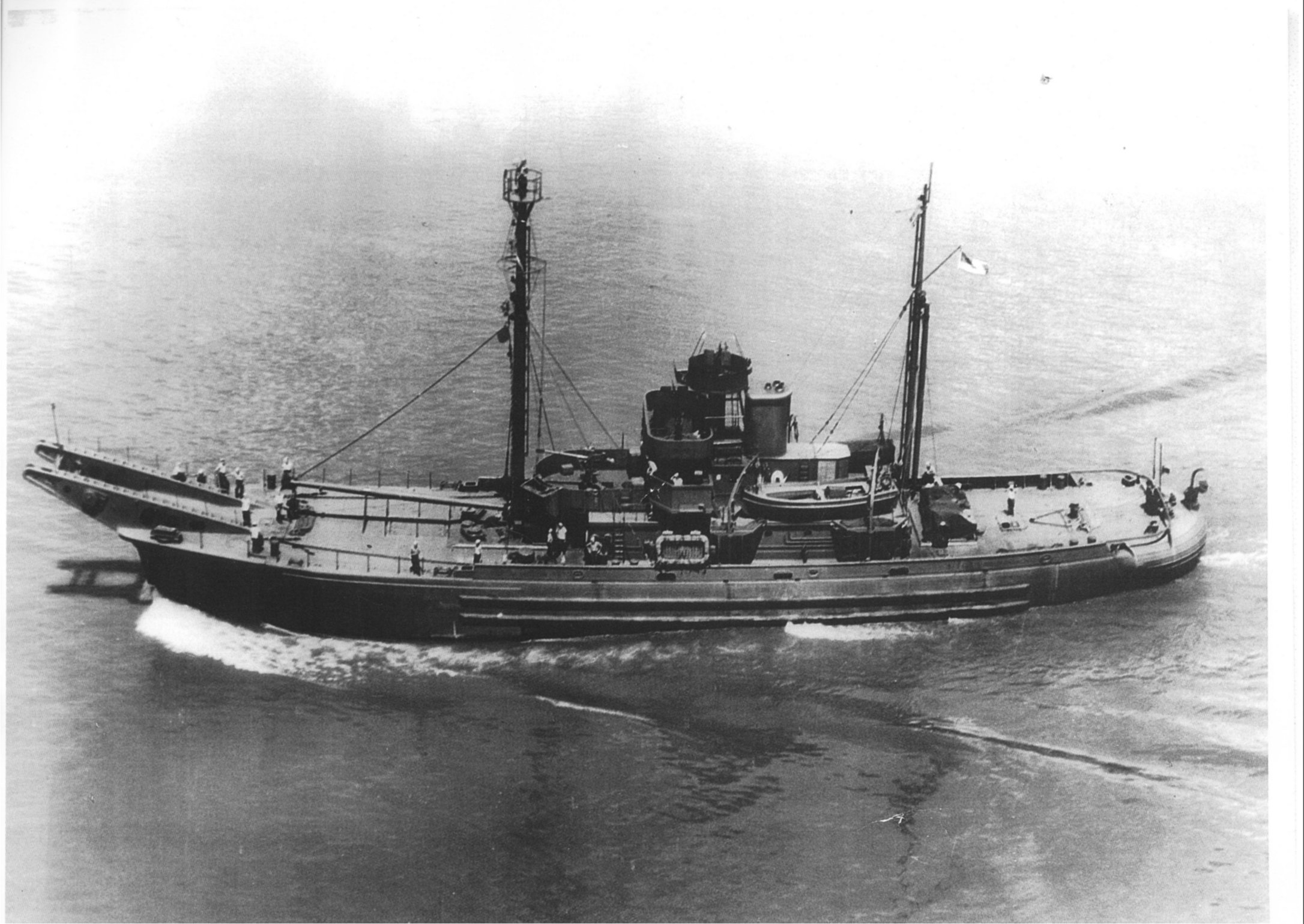

History

United States
- Name: USS Stagbush
- Namesake: A tree
- Builder: Canulette Shipbuilding Co. Inc., Slidell, Louisiana
- Laid down: 9 February 1943 as Stagbush (YN-93)
- Launched: 29 January 1944
- Commissioned: 30 August 1944 as USS Stagbush (AN-69)
- Decommissioned: 26 March 1946, at Mare Island Navy Yard, Vallejo, California
- Reclassified: AN-69, 20 January 1944
- Stricken: 21 May 1946
- Honours and awards: one battle star for World War II service
- Fate: Sold in April 1947; burned, 16 October 1954, at Norfolk, Virginia

General characteristics
- Class & type: Ailanthus-class net laying ship
- Displacement: 1,275 tons
- Length: 194 ft 6 in (59.28 m)
- Beam: 37 ft (11 m)
- Draft: 13 ft 6 in (4.11 m)
- Propulsion: diesel electric, 2,500hp
- Speed: 12 knots
- Complement: 56 officers and enlisted
- Armament: one single 3 in (76 mm) gun mount, four twin 20 mm gun mounts

USS Stagbush (AN-69/YN-93) was an Ailanthus-class net laying ship which served with the United States Navy in the western Pacific Ocean theatre of operations during World War II. Her career was without major incident, and she returned home safely after the war with one battle star to her credit.

== Built in Slidell, Louisiana ==
Stagbush (AN-69) was laid down on 9 February 1943 by Canulette Shipbuilding Company, Inc., Slidell, Louisiana; launched on 29 January 1944; and commissioned on 30 August 1944.

== World War II service ==
Stagbush sailed for Melville, Rhode Island, on 8 September only to be caught in a storm on the 14th off Cape Hatteras, North Carolina, which required that she be drydocked after her shakedown. She was in the Snow Shipyards, Rockland, Maine, from 12 October to 6 December 1944.

When she was ready for sea again, Stagbush sailed for Hawaii via the Panama Canal; San Diego, California; and Tiburon, Mexico, where she took on a load of nets. She arrived at Pearl Harbor on 12 February 1945 and sailed the next day via Eniwetok; Ulithi; and Leyte, Philippine Islands, for the Ryukyu Islands.

Stagbush arrived at Kerama Retto on 26 March and began laying nets to protect the anchorage. She remained there until mid-July when, after removing the nets, she moved to Buckner Bay, Okinawa. The ship sailed for Wakayama, Japan, on 8 September, to assist in clearing mines. A few days later, she laid swept channel buoys in Kii Suido after minesweepers had cleared the entrance. She then returned to Okinawa for acoustic minesweeping gear to be transported to Japan.

== End-of-war activity ==
Stagbush remained at Sasebo for a few days and then moved to Fukuoka in late October to act as tender for auxiliary motor minesweepers. This duty was completed on 2 December 1945 and the net layer got underway for San Francisco, California.

== Post-war decommissioning ==
Stagbush was decommissioned at Mare Island, California, on 26 March 1946 and struck from the Navy List on 21 May.

== Civilian career ==
She was sold to Robert A. Martinolich in April 1947 and converted for merchant service. Sold in 1948 to Maderena Babun, San Lorenzo, Honduras and renamed Anna Lucia, in 1949 she was renamed Omar Babun. On 14 May, 1954 she suffered cargo shift in a gale and was run aground to prevent sinking about 300 yards off the Outer Banks, about three miles north of the Chicamacomico Coast Guard Station in Rodanthe, North Carolina. She was sold to American “Nip” Canipe who refloated her after cargo was salvaged. She was refloated by late July. She burned at Norfolk, Virginia, on 16 October 1954

== Honors and awards ==
Stagbush received one battle star for World War II service.
