= MV John Lyras =

History
- Name: Empire Elaine (1942–47); John Lyras (1947–70); Boundary (1970–72)
- Owner: Ministry of War Transport (1942–45); Ministry of Transport (1945–47); Marine Enterprises Ltd (1947–59); Viking Shipping Corporation (1959–70); New Frontier Shipping Co Inc (1970–72) Official No. 4841 PEXT
- Operator: Clan Line Steamers Ltd (1942–47); Lyras & Lemos Bros Ltd (1947–59); Lyras Bros Ltd, London (1959–70); Gersigny & Co (Pty) Ltd (1970–72)
- Port of registry: (United Kingdom) Barrow in Furness, UK (1942-47); United Kingdom (1947–59); Greece (1959–64); Monrovia, Liberia (1964–70); Panama City, Panama (1970–72)
- Builder: Vickers-Armstrongs Ltd
- Launched: 30 July 1942
- Completed: November 1942
- Identification: United Kingdom Official Number 167744 (1942-59); Code Letters BFCX (1942-59)
- Fate: Scrapped

General characteristics
- Class & type: Heavy lift ship
- Tonnage: 7,513 GRT; 5,133 NRT; 10,300 DWT
- Length: 416 ft 0 in (126.80 m)
- Beam: 66 ft 7 in (20.29 m)
- Draught: 26 ft 7 in (8.10 m)
- Depth: 31 ft 0 in (9.45 m)
- Installed power: 516 nhp
- Propulsion: One 2SCSA Diesel engine, single screw propeller

John Lyras was a 7,513 GRT heavy lift ship that was built in 1942 as Empire Elaine by Vickers-Armstrongs Ltd, Barrow in Furness, Lancashire, United Kingdom for the Ministry of War Transport (MoWT). She spent most of the Second World War serving in the Indian Ocean, although she did visit the Mediterranean to take part in Operation Husky and Operation Dragoon.

In 1947, she was sold into merchant service and renamed John Lyras. In 1959, she was sold to a Panamanian owner. A further sale in 1970 saw her renamed Boundary. She served until 1972 when she was scrapped.

== Description ==
The ship was built in 1942 by Vickers-Armstrongs Ltd, Barrow in Furness, Lancashire.

The ship was 416 feet 0 inches (126.80 m) long, with a beam of 66 feet 7 inches (20.29 m). She had a depth of 31 feet 0 inches (9.45 m) and a draught of 27 feet 6 inches (8.38 m). She was assessed at 7,513 GRT, 5,133 NRT, 10,300 DWT.

The ship was propelled by a 516 nhp two-stroke Single Cycle, Single Action diesel engine, which had three cylinders of 23 5/8 inches (60 cm) diameter by 91 5/16 inches (231.9 cm) stroke driving a single screw propeller. The engine was built by Doxfords.

== History ==
=== World War II ===
Empire Elaine was built for the MoWT. She was launched on 30 July 1942 and completed in November. She was placed under the management of Clan Line Steamers Ltd. The United Kingdom Official Number 167744 and Code Letters BFCX were allocated. Her port of registry was Barrow in Furness.

Empire Elaine departed from Barrow in Furness on 6 November 1942 for Liverpool, Lancashire, arriving the next day. She departed on 23 November for the Clyde, arriving that day. She joined Convoy KMS 5, which departed from the Clyde on 11 December and arrived at Bône, Algeria on 27 December. On 23 December, Empire Elaine detached from the convoy bound for Freetown, Sierra Leone, which was reached via Bathurst, South Africa. She arrived at Bathurst on 28 December and sailed two days later for Freetown, arriving on 2 January 1943. Empire Elaine was a member of Convoy ST 53, which departed from Freetown on 19 January and arrived at Takoradi, Gold Coast on 23 January. She departed on 3 February for Lagos, Northern Nigeria, arriving the next day and sailing for Takoradi on 11 February. She arrived two days later and sailed on 14 February for Freetown, where she arrived on 18 February. Empire Elaine was a member of Convoy SR 2, which departed on 24 February and arrived at Gibraltar on 8 March. She then joined Convoy MKS 9, which had departed from Bône on 4 March and arrived at Liverpool on 18 March. She sailed on to the Clyde, arriving that day.

As part of Operation Husky, Empire Elaine was a member of Convoy KMS 18B, which departed from the Clyde on 24 June. and arrived at its destination, codenamed "Acid North", on 10 July. She departed from Syracuse, Sicily, Italy, under escort on 11 July for Tripoli, Libya, arriving on 14 July. Empire Elaine was a member of Convoy MES 36, which departed on 16 July and arrived at Port Said, Egypt on 23 July. She departed on 14 August for Beirut, Lebanon, arriving the next day and departing on 28 August for Port Said, where she arrived the next day before departing for Suez, from where she departed on 4 September for Aden, arriving on 9 September. Empire Elaine departed later that day of Bombay, India, where she arrived on 16 September. She was a member of Convoy BM 75, which departed on 19 November and arrived at Colombo, Ceylon on 24 November. She returned to Bombay as a member of Convoy MB 57, which departed on 7 December and arrived on 12 December.

Empire Elaine was a member of Convoy BM 82, which departed from Bombay on 14 January 1944 and arrived at Colombo on 19 January. She departed the next day as a member of Convoy JC 34, which arrived at Calcutta, India on 28 January. She left the convoy at Trincomalee, Ceylon on 22 January, departing two days later for Colombo, where she arrived on 26 January. Empire Elaine then joined Convoy MB 63, which departed on 27 January and arrived at Bombay on 1 February. She departed from Bombay on 9 February for Basra, Iraq, arriving on 16 February and departing ten days later for Bandar Abbas, Iran, from where she departed on 3 March as a member of Convoy PB 70, which arrived at Bombay on 9 March. Empire Elaine left the convoy at Karachi, India on 6 March, sailing two days later for Bombay, where she arrived on 11 March.

Empire Elaine was a member of Convoy BM 90, which departed on 20 March and arrived at Colombo on 24 March. She departed the next day with Convoy JC 42, which arrived at Calcutta, India on 31 March. She left the convoy at Vizag on 30 March, sailing on 2 April as the only member of Convoy MA 28A, which arrived at Chittagong on 5 April. She departed on 8 April as the only member of Convoy AM 2A, which arrived at Vizag on 10 April. Empire Elaine sailed on 17 April to join Convoy CJ24, which had departed from Calcutta on 15 April and arrived at Colombo on 22 April. She was a member of Convoy MB 74, which departed on 24 April and arrived at Bombay on 29 April. She departed on 11 May as the only merchant ship in Convoy BM 94B, escorted by the Bathurst-class corvettes HMAS Bathurst and HMAS Tamworth. The convoy arrived at Colombo on 15 May. Empire Elaine was a member of Convoy JC 49, which departed on 20 May and arrived at Calcutta on 27 May. She left the convoy at Trincomalee on 22 May, sailing nine days later to join Convoy CJ 29, which had departed from Calcutta on 25 May and arrived at Colombo on 2 June. She then formed Convoy MB 74B, which departed on 2 June. She put into Cochin, India on 4 June, departing on 9 June and arriving at Bombay on 12 June.

Empire Elaine was the only merchant ship in Convoy BA 74A, which departed on 1 July escorted by HMIS Bombay. She put back into Bombay, arriving on 8 July. She departed on 11 July as the only merchant ship in Convoy BA 74B, escorted by HMS Rosebay. The convoy arrived at Aden on 23 July. She departed that day for Suez, arriving on 28 July. Empire Elaine then sailed to Port Said to join Convoy GUS 48, which departed on 3 August and arrived at the Hampton Roads, Virginia, United States on 28 August. She left the convoy at Augusta, Sicily on 8 August. She was a member of Convoy VN 58, which departed on 10 August and arrived at Naples on 11 August. She then joined Convoy SM 1C, which departed on 12 August in support of Operation Dragoon. Empire Elaine was carrying twenty landing craft. She then returned to Naples, from where she departed on 29 August for an undisclosed destination, returning on 31 August. She was a member of Convoy NV 63, which departed on 9 September and arrived at Augusta the next day. She departed a week later to join Convoy KMS 62, which had sailed from Gibraltar on 12 September and arrived at Port Said on 22 September. She then sailed to Suez.

Empire Elaine was departed from Suez on 2 October for Aden, arriving on 7 October and departing two days later for Bombay, where she arrived on 16 October. She departed on 31 October for Cochin, arriving on 3 November and departing the next day for Colombo, where she arrived on 6 November. She was a member of Convoy JC 67, which departed on 9 November and arrived at Bombay on 17 November. She left the convoy at Trincomalee on 11 November, sailing three days later to join Convoy CJ 43, which had departed from Calcutta on 9 November and arrived at Colombo on 16 November. She then sailed to Cochin, departing from there on 20 November to return to Colombo, where she arrived two days later. Along with Barpeta, she was one of the two ships that formed Convoy JC 68B, which departed on 22 November and arrived at Vizag on 27 November. The same two ships then formed Convoy CJ 44A, which departed on 29 November and arrived at Cochin on 5 December. Empire Elaine then departed on 9 December for Colombo, arriving two days later. She then joined Barpeta again to form Convoy JC 70A, which departed on 11 December and arrived at Chittagong on 19 December. She departed under escort two days later for Vizag, arriving on 24 December and departing under escort four days later for Chittagong, where she arrived on 31 December.

Empire Elaine departed Chittagong under escort on 3 January 1945, arriving at Bombay on 12 January. She departed on 27 January for Cochin, arriving two days later and departing on 1 February for Bombay, where she arrived on 10 February. She departed ten days later for Basra, arriving on 27 February. She departed on 5 March for Bombay, where she arrived on 12 March. Empire Elaine departed on 27 March for Calcutta, arriving on 4 April. She departed under escort on 2 May for Kyaukpyu, Burma, from where she departed on 4 May as a member of Convoy KRS 1A, which was bound for Rangoon. She was escorted back to Kyaukpyu, arriving on 5 May.

Empire Elaine then sailed to Akyab, Burma, from where she departed on 16 May for Vizag, arriving two days later. She departed for Calcutta on 21 May, arriving three days later. Along with Tilapa she was one of two ships that formed Convoy KR 7C, which departed on 2 June and arrived at Rangoon on 6 June. She then formed Convoy RK 3A, which departed on 11 June and arrived at Akyab on 14 June. Empire Elaine departed on 17 June for Vizag, arriving on 20 June and sailing two days later for Kyaukpyu, where she arrived on 24 June. She departed two days later for Rangoon, arriving on 2 July. She was a member of Convoy RK 9, which departed on 7 July and arrived at Calcutta on 10 July. She then returned to Rangoon, from where she departed on 23 July for Calcutta, arriving four days later.

=== Post-war ===
Empire Elaine departed from Calcutta on 21 September 1945 for Port Swettenham, Malaya, arriving on 28 September. She departed on 5 October for Bombay, arriving on 14 October and sailing eight days later for Singapore, where she arrived on 31 October. She departed on 4 November for Calcutta, arriving on 10 November and departing eleven days later for Singapore, where she arrived on 27 November. She sailed on 4 December for Cochin, arriving on 11 December and sailing three days later for Colombo, where she arrived the next day. She departed on 18 December for Singapore, arriving on 24 December.

In January 1946, Captain Inman, master of Empire Elaine was awarded an OBE for his service during the war. In 1947, Empire Elaine was sold to Marine Enterprises Ltd and renamed John Lyras. She was operated under the management of Lyras & Lemos Bros Ltd, London, remaining under the British flag. In 1950, John Lyras was one of the ships that participated in the evacuation of Hŭngnam, North Korea.

In 1959, John Lyras was sold to Viking Shipping Corporation, Monrovia, Liberia. She was placed under the Greek flag, and the management of Lyras Bros. Ltd, London. In 1964, she was reflagged to Liberia. In 1970, John Lyras was sold to the New Frontier Shipping Co Inc, Monrovia, and was renamed Boundary. She was placed under the Panamanian Flag. Boundary was operated under the management of Gersigny & Co (Pty) Ltd, Durban, South Africa. She served until 1972, arriving in September at Kaohsiung, Taiwan for scrapping.
