= Pajtás =

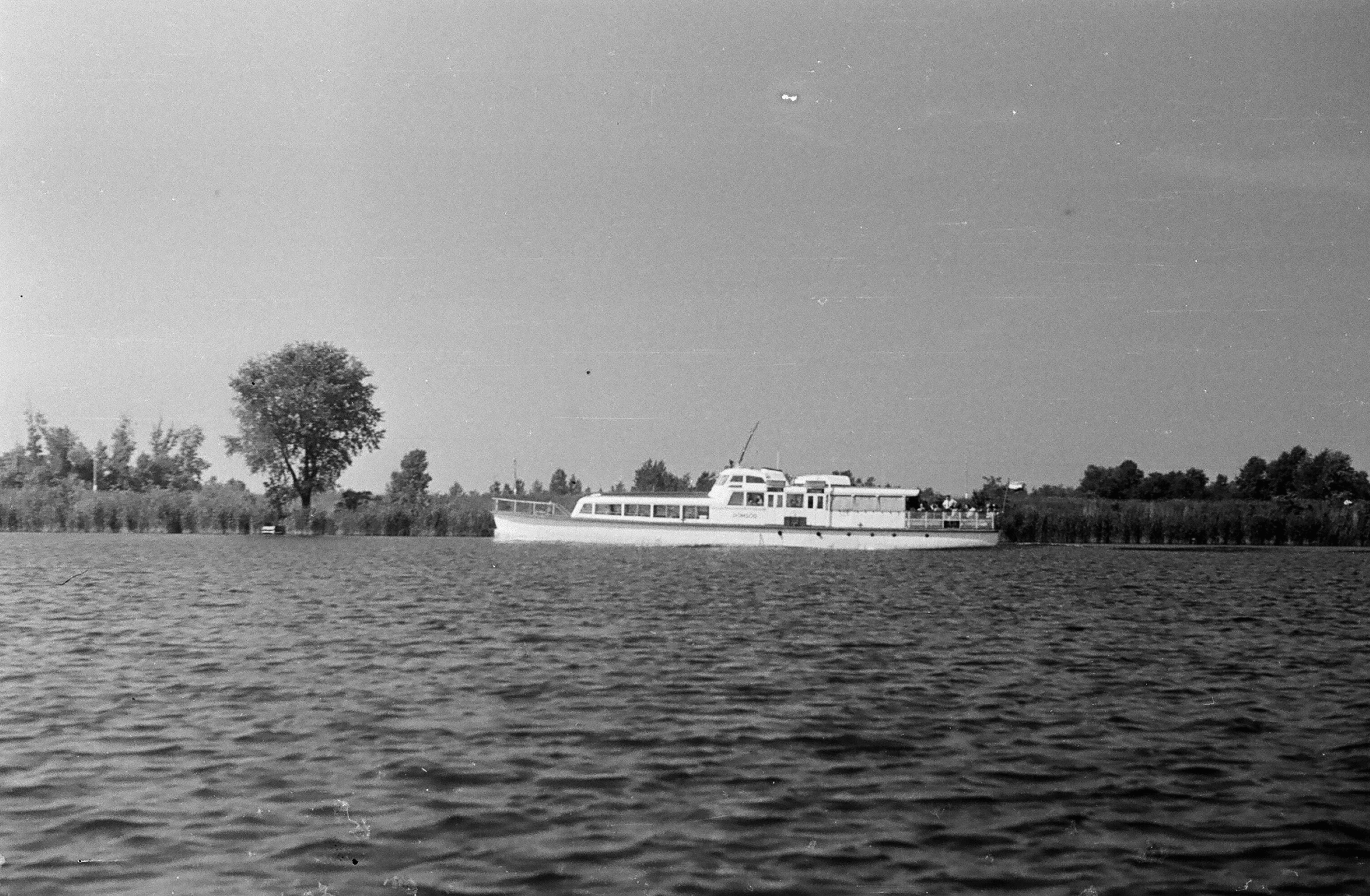
Dömsöd in 1961

Pajtás was a steam-powered passenger ship manufactured in 1918, by Schlick-Nicholson shipyard in Budapest. It was designed to carry passengers on the Danube, and its first name was "2nd boat." In 1945, during World War II she ran into an underwater mine in Budapest, and sank. After the end of the war, it was raised, and turned back to service.

Later it was commissioned to Lake Balaton with a lot of modifications (e.g. expanding capacity from 150 to 200), but without any official stability test or approval. At that time, she was given the name Pajtás (Hungarian for "mate").

== Disaster ==
On 30 May 1954 a lot of people were celebrating children's day. Pajtás was starting from Balatonfüred to Siófok with 178 passengers. Shortly after departure, the ship tilted to port then starboard. The captain tried to restore stability but the third tilt (again to port) was deadly, and the ship capsized. The steam was emergency released by the boiler room operator, which cost him his life but prevented more casualties by explosion of the boiler.

The exact number of casualties is still a matter of discussion. The official report by communist newspapers counted 12 people. The list made by survivors on the 45th anniversary of the sinking counted 23 names. One witness said, he counted 43 bodies after the accident.

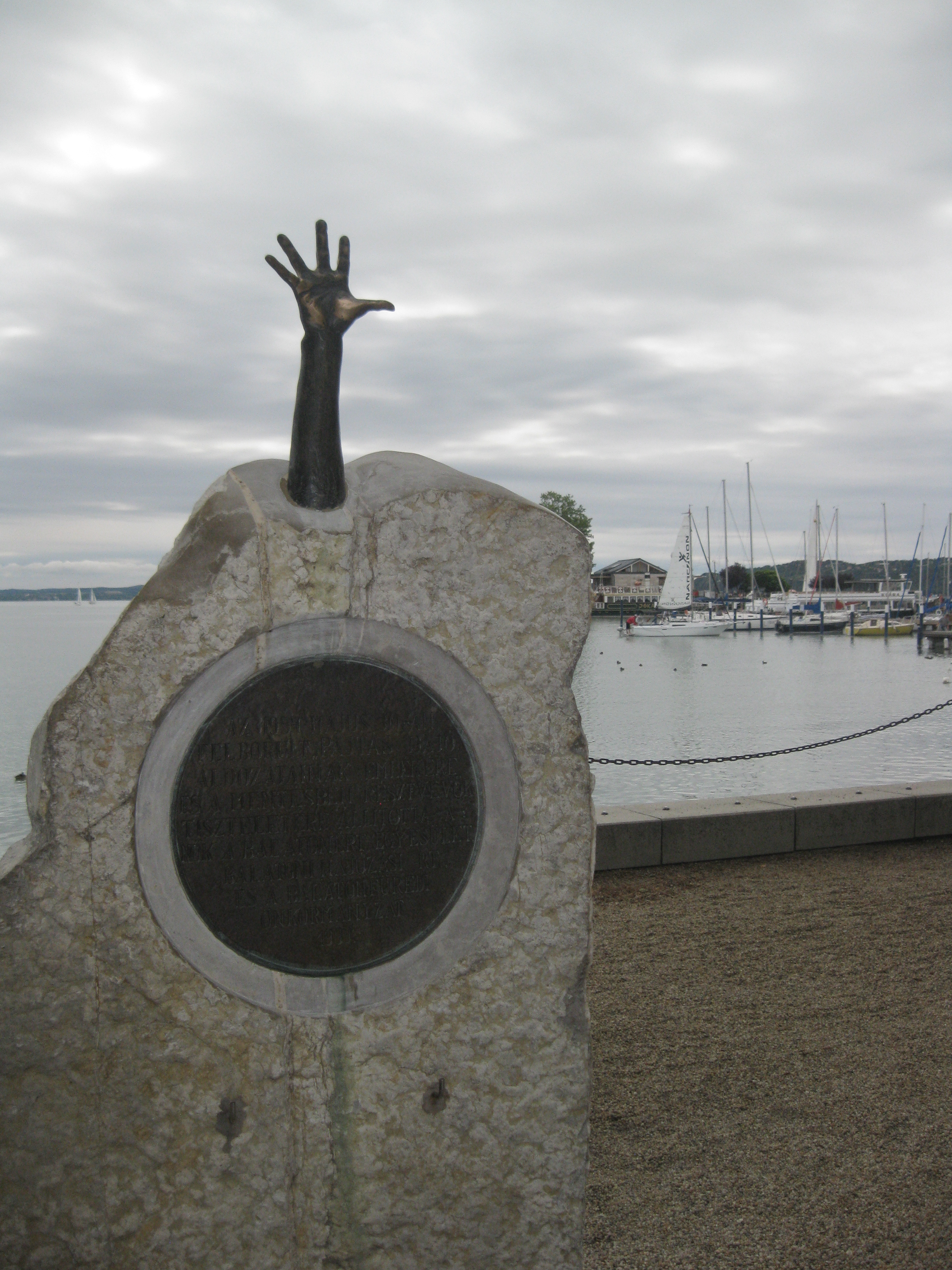
The Memorial of the 1954 accident in Balatonfüred (erected 1999)

After the accident, the ship was raised, turned into a motorship, and got the name Siófok. In 1957, she sailed back to the Danube, and she was given the name Dömsöd. The ship was finally withdrawn from service in 1987. Now she's laid up in the bay of Pilismarót.
