= Kalgin Island =

Island in Kenai Peninsula Borough, Alaska, United States

Coordinates: 60°27′53″N 151°55′51″W

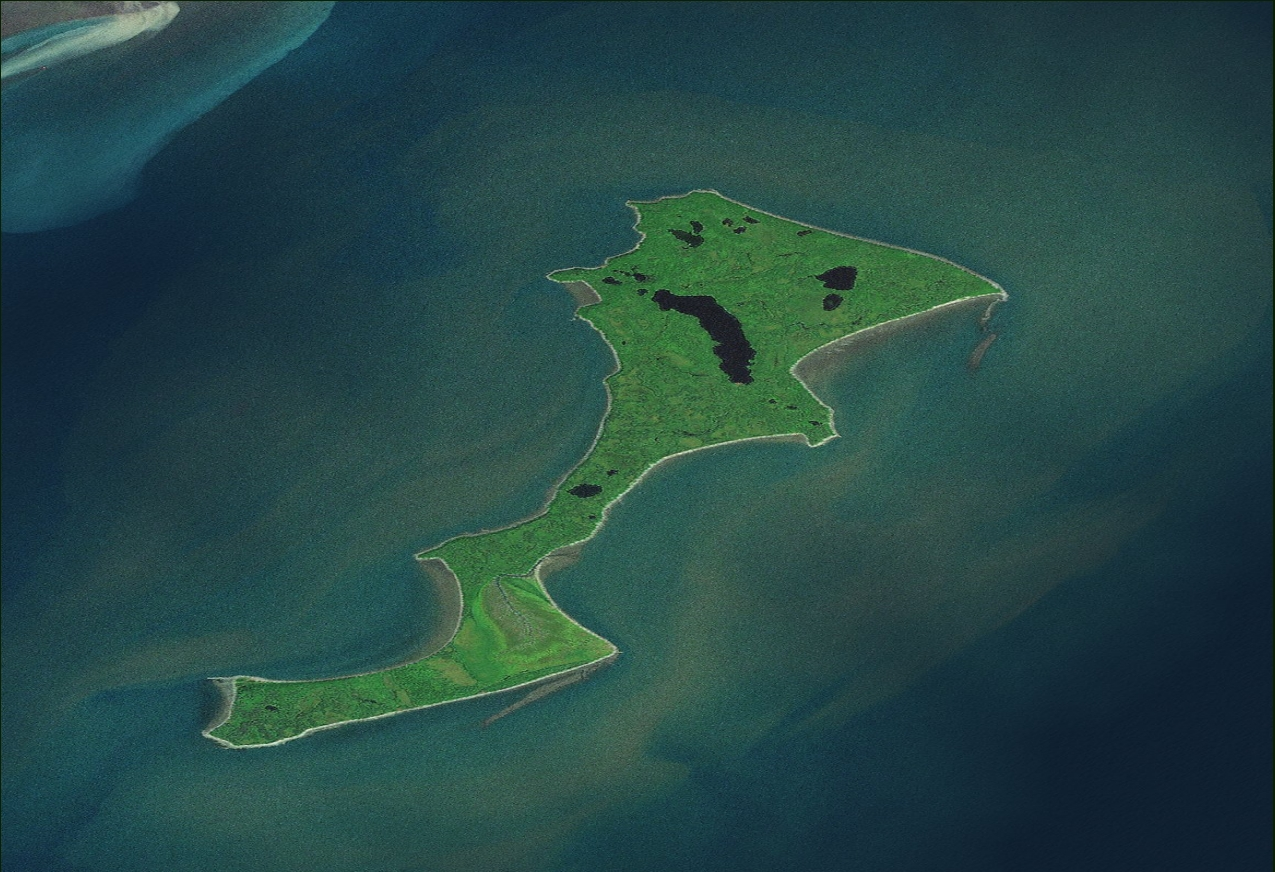
Satellite picture of Kalgin Island

Kalgin Island (Dena'ina: Qelghin) is an island in Cook Inlet of the Gulf of Alaska, southwest of the city of Kenai, Alaska, United States. It is part of the Kenai Peninsula Borough and has a land area of 58.722 km^{2} (22.673 sq mi), is 11.5 km (7.1 mi) long and reported an official resident population of one person as of the 2000 census.
