= SS Samoland =

American Liberty Ship

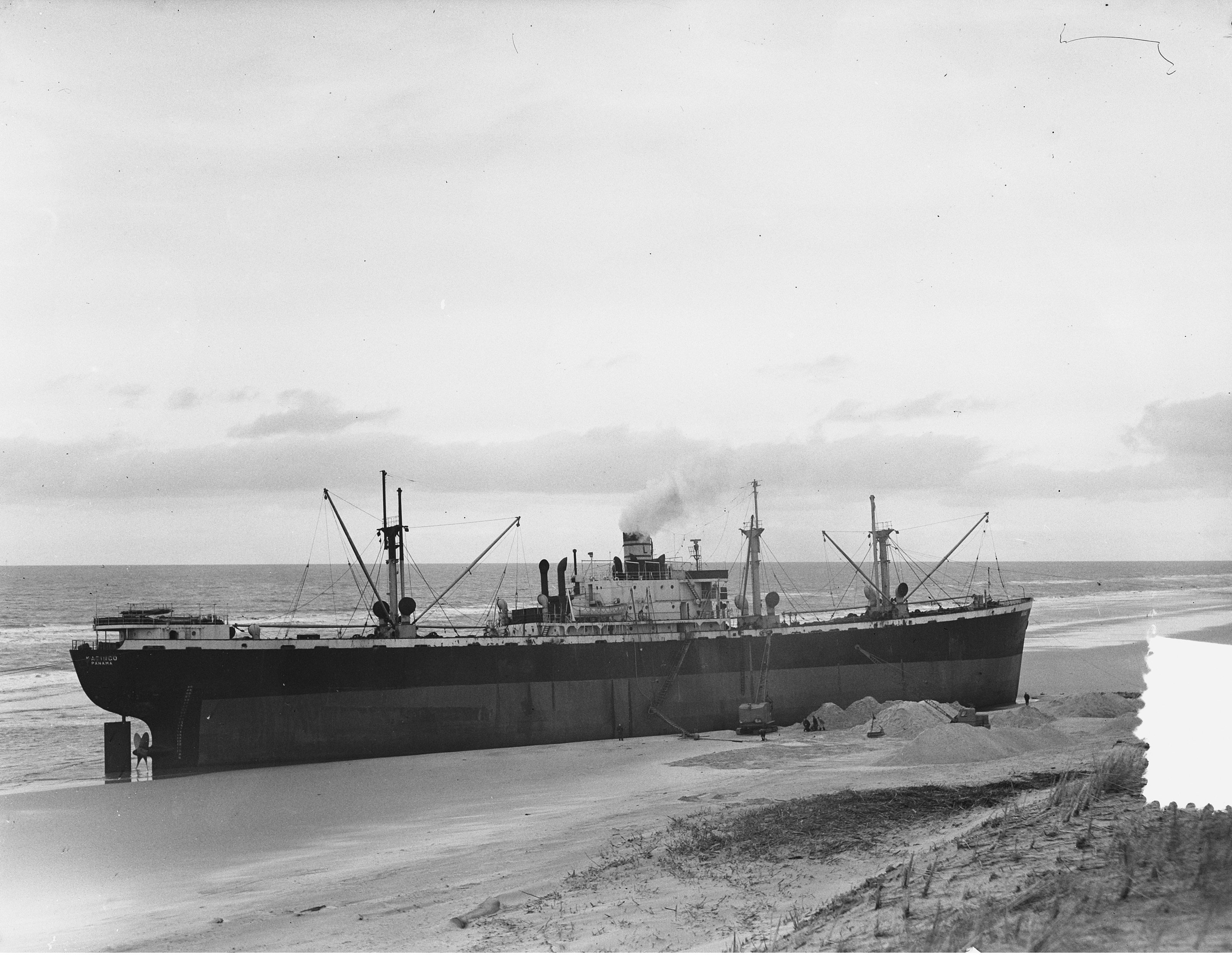
- SS Katingo on 11 December 1955

History

United States
- Name: Samoland
- Ordered: as type (EC2-S-C1) hull, MC hull 2359
- Builder: J.A. Jones Construction, Brunswick, Georgia
- Cost: $1,028,195
- Yard number: 144
- Way number: 4
- Laid down: 10 April 1944
- Launched: 20 May 1944
- Sponsored by: Mrs. H.B. Jones
- Completed: 9 June 1944
- Fate: Transferred to the British Ministry of War Transport upon completion.

United Kingdom
- Name: Samoland
- Operator: E.R. Management Co.
- Acquired: 26 May 1944
- Renamed: Sea Triumph, 1947; Asuncion De Larrinaga, 1948; Katingo, 1951; Virginia G, 1955; Kapetaissa, 1960; National Strength, 1964; Good Eddie, 1967
- Identification: Call Signal: GSWL
- Fate: Sold to merchant service; Scrapped, 1968

General characteristics
- Class & type: Liberty ship; type EC2-S-C1, standard
- Tonnage: 10,865 LT DWT; 7,176 GRT
- Displacement: 3,380 long tons (3,434 t) (light); 14,245 long tons (14,474 t) (max)
- Length: 441 feet 6 inches (135 m) oa; 416 feet (127 m) pp; 427 feet (130 m) lwl
- Beam: 57 feet (17 m)
- Draft: 27 ft 9.25 in (8.4646 m)
- Installed power: 2 × Oil fired 450 °F (232 °C) boilers, operating at 220 psi (1,500 kPa); 2,500 hp (1,900 kW)
- Propulsion: 1 × triple-expansion steam engine, (manufactured by Filer and Stowell, Milwaukee, Wisconsin); 1 × screw propeller
- Speed: 11.5 knots (21.3 km/h; 13.2 mph)
- Capacity: 562,608 cubic feet (15,931 m^{3}) (grain); 499,573 cubic feet (14,146 m^{3}) (bale)
- Complement: 38–62 USMM; 21–40 USNAG
- Armament: Varied by ship; Bow-mounted 3-inch (76 mm)/50-caliber gun; Stern-mounted 4-inch (102 mm)/50-caliber gun; 2–8 × single 20-millimeter (0.79 in) Oerlikon anti-aircraft (AA) cannons and/or, 2–8 × 37-millimeter (1.46 in) M1 AA guns

SS Samoland was a Liberty ship built in the United States during World War II. She was transferred to the British Ministry of War Transportation (MoWT) upon completion.

== Construction ==
Samoland was laid down on 10 April 1944, under a Maritime Commission (MARCOM) contract, MC hull 2359, by J.A. Jones Construction, Brunswick, Georgia; sponsored by Mrs. H.B. Jones, daughter-in-law of James Addison Jones, and launched on 20 May 1944.

== History ==
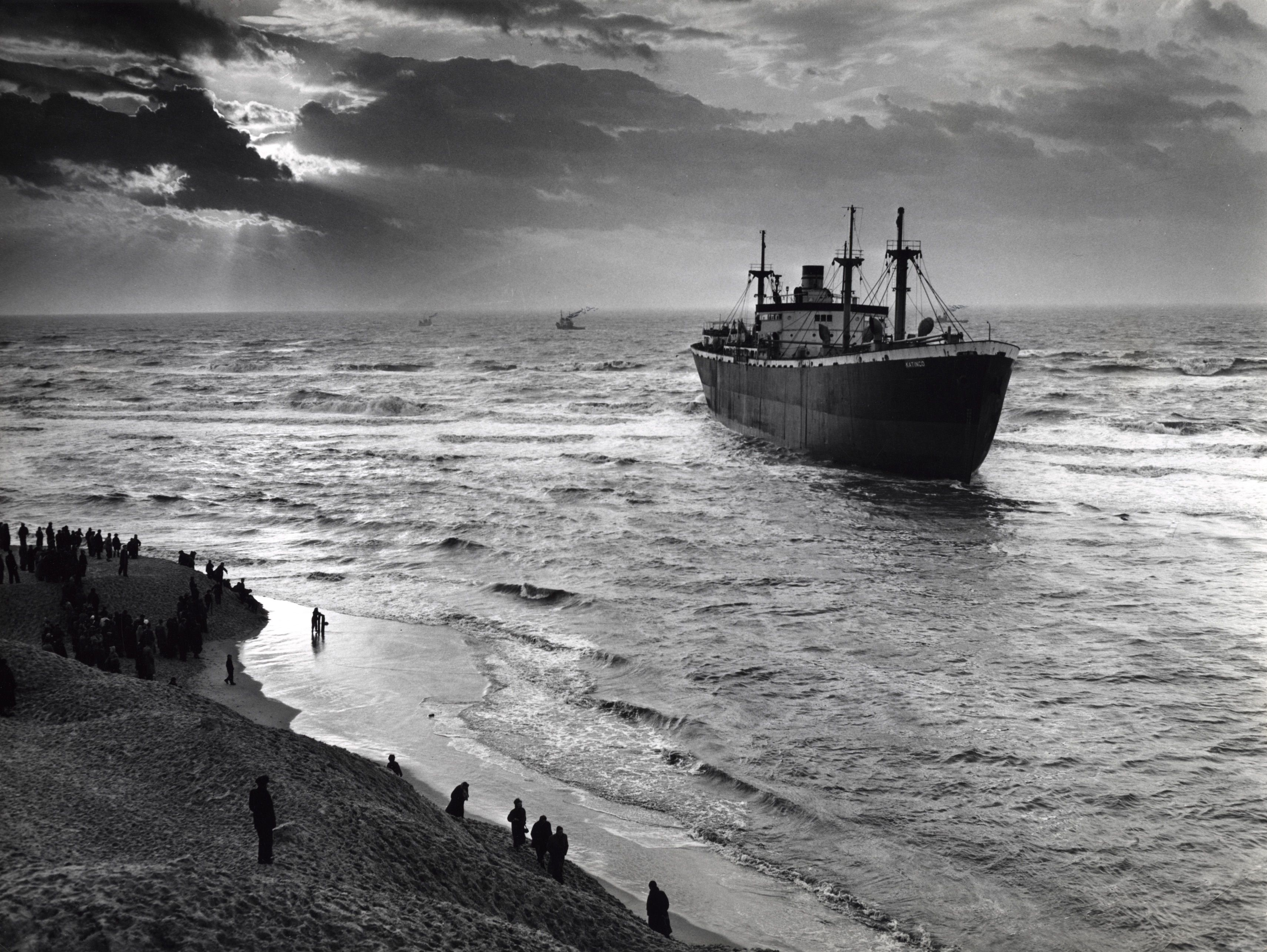
Stranded on the coast as Katingo, near Bergen aan Zee, 1954

She was allocated to E.R. Management Co., on 9 June 1944. On 30 April 1947, she was sold to the Dover Navigation Co., for commercial use. She was wrecked in 1955, and declared a constructive total loss (CTL), but rebuilt. She was again wrecked in 1968, and scrapped the same year.

== Bibliography ==
- "Jones Construction, Brunswick GA". www.ShipbuildingHistory.com. 13 October 2010.
- "Liberty Ships – World War II".
- Maritime Administration. "Samoland". Ship History Database Vessel Status Card. U.S. Department of Transportation, Maritime Administration. Archived from the original on 12 December 2019.
- Davies, James (May 2004). "Specifications (As-Built)" (PDF). p. 23.
- "SS Samoland".
