= SS Norvarg =

Refrigerated cargo ship (1920–1971)

History
- Name: Rotarian (1920–27); Condor (1927–40); Empire Elk (1940–42); Norvarg (1942–47); Nan Chiang (1947–50); Northern Glow (1950–59); Hoping 46 (Hoping Ssu Shi Liu) (1959–71)
- Owner: United States Shipping Board (1920–27); Grace Steamship Co Inc (1927–40); Ministry of Shipping (1940–41); Ministry of War Transport (1941–42); Norwegian Government (1942–46); Wallem & Co Ltd (1946-50); Great Northern Shipping Co Ltd (1950–59); Chinese Government (1959–71)
- Operator: United States Shipping Board (1920–23); Grace Steamship Co Inc (1923–40); Larringa Steamship Co Ltd (1940–42); Nortraship (1942–46); Nan Way Shipping Co (1946-50); Great Northern Shipping Co Ltd (1950–59); Chinese Government (1959–71)
- Port of registry: Tacoma, WA, United States (1920–23); (United States) New York, NY (1923–40); London, United Kingdom (1940–42); Oslo, Norway (1942–46); Panama City, Panama (1946–50); United Kingdom (1950–59); China (1959–71)
- Builder: Todd Dry Dock and Construction Company
- Launched: 17 June 1920
- Identification: United Kingdom Official Number 168026 (1940–42, 1950–59); Code Letters GLTL (1940–42); Code Letters LNAI (1942–46)
- Fate: Removed from shipping registers in 1971

General characteristics
- Class & type: Design 1014 ship
- Tonnage: 4,748 GRT; 2,986 NRT; 7,500 DWT
- Length: 380 ft 3 in (115.90 m)
- Beam: 53 ft 1 in (16.18 m)
- Depth: 27 ft 0 in (8.23 m)
- Installed power: 339 nhp
- Propulsion: Triple expansion steam engine, single screw propeller
- Speed: 10 knots (19 km/h)

Norvarg was a 4,748 GRT Design 1014 refrigerated cargo ship that was built in 1920 as Rotarian by the Todd Dry Dock and Construction Company, Tacoma, Washington, United States for the United States Shipping Board (USSB). She was sold to the Grace Steamship Co Inc, New York in 1923 and renamed Condor. In 1940, she was sold to the British Ministry of Shipping (MoS), which became the Ministry of War Transport (MoWT) in 1941, and was renamed Empire Elk. In 1942, she was transferred to the Norwegian Government and renamed Norvarg.

She was sold to a Hong Kong company in 1946 and renamed Nan Chiang. A further sale in 1950 saw her renamed Northern Glow. In 1959, she was sold to the Chinese Government and renamed Hoping 46 (Hoping Ssu Shi Liu). She was removed from the shipping registers in 1971.

== Description ==
The ship was a Design 1014 cargo ship. She was built in 1920 by Todd Drydock & Construction Corp, Tacoma, Washington, "presented by" the Rotary Club of Tacoma.

The ship was 380 feet 3 inches (115.90 m) long, with a beam of 53 feet 1 inch (16.18 m). She had a depth of 27 feet 0 inches (8.23 m). She was assessed at 4,748 GRT, 2,986 NRT. 7,500 DWT. She was fitted with refrigeration equipment.

The ship was propelled by a 339 nhp triple expansion steam engine, which had cylinders of 24 inches (61 cm), 40 inches (100 cm) and 70 inches (180 cm) diameter by 48 inches (120 cm) stroke. The engine was built by Todd Drydock & Construction Corp. It drove a single screw propeller and could propel the ship at 10 knots (19 km/h).

== History ==
=== Pre-WWII ===
Rotarian was launched in 1920. She was built for the USSB, Tacoma, Washington. She was in service by January 1921, as she arrived at Buenos Aires, Argentina on 4 February from Tacoma. In 1924, she was sold to the Grace Steamship Co Inc, New York. for $173,025 with special provisions (restricted operation in designated trade route) and renamed Condor in 1927.

=== WWII ===
==== Condor ====
In June 1940, Condor was sold to the MoS. She departed from Seattle, Washington on 27 June for Portland, arriving the next day. On 16 July, she departed for New Westminster, British Columbia, Canada, where she arrived on 18 July, departing two days later for San Francisco, California, arriving on 23 July. She sailed on 26 July for Los Angeles, California arriving on 30 July and sailing that day for Balboa, Panama, arriving on 14 August. She then sailed to Cristóbal, from where she departed on 15 August for Bermuda, arriving on 23 August. Condor was a member of Convoy BHX 69, which departed from Bermuda on 27 August and joined Convoy HX 69 on 1 September. She was carrying general cargo and was bound for Liverpool, Lancashire. Convoy HX 69 had departed from Halifax, Nova Scotia, Canada on 28 August and arrived at Liverpool on 12 September. On 4 September, Condor straggled behind the convoy due to engine trouble, but was able to rejoin the convoy the next morning.

==== Empire Elk ====
Condor was renamed Empire Elk. The United Kingdom Official Number 168206 and Code Letters GLTL were allocated. She was placed under the management of the Larrinaga Line and her port of registry was London. The MoS became the MoWT in 1941. Empire Elk was a member of Convoy OB 231, which departed from Liverpool on 19 October and dispersed at sea on 23 October. She was in ballast and bound for New York, which was reached on 8 November. She departed on 19 November for Halifax, arriving on 23 November. She was due to join Convoy HX 90, which departed on 21 November and arrived at Liverpool on 5 December, but arrived at Halifax too late and joined the next convoy, HX 91. That convoy departed on 25 November and arrived at Liverpool on 11 December. Empire Elk was carrying a cargo of steel and scrap iron. During the voyage, her engine broke down, and she had to be towed into Liverpool, arriving on 18 December.

Empire Elk was a member of Convoy OB 311, which departed from Liverpool on 16 April and dispersed at 61°00′N 32°40′W on 25 April. She was bound for New York, which was reached on 10 May. She departed on 24 May for Halifax, arriving on 28 May. She was a member of Convoy HX 130, which departed on 1 June and arrived at Liverpool on 20 June. Empire Elk was carrying a cargo of scrap steel. On 4 June, she straggled behind the convoy, leaving the convoy at 42°23′N 52°59′W due to fog and a storm. She sailed to Loch Ewe, arriving on 18 June and then sailing to the Clyde, where she arrived on 21 June.

Empire Elk departed from the Clyde on 28 August to join Convoy ON 10, which had departed from Liverpool the previous day and dispersed at sea on 11 September. She was bound for Galveston, Texas, United States, where she arrived on 25 September. She departed on 4 October for Sydney, Cape Breton, Nova Scotia, Canada, arriving on 17 October. Empire Elk was a member of Convoy SC 51, which departed on 23 October and arrived at Liverpool on 9 November. She was carrying a cargo of sulphur.

Empire Elk was a member of Convoy ON 47, which departed from Liverpool on 15 December and dispersed at 58°42′N 46°00′W on 23 December. She was bound for Saint John, New Brunswick, Canada, where she arrived on 4 January 1942. She departed the next day for Boston, Massachusetts, United States, arriving on 7 January and sailing a week later for Halifax, where she arrived on 16 January. Empire Elk was due to join Convoy SC 68, but she missed this convoy and the following convoy, SC 69. She joined Convoy SC 70, which departed on 16 February and arrived at Liverpool on 7 March. She was carrying general cargo, bound for Derry, County Londonderry, Northern Ireland, where she arrived on 6 March. She departed on 18 March for the Clyde, arriving the next day.

==== Norvarg ====
On 27 March, Empire Elk was transferred to the Norwegian Government and renamed Norvarg. She was placed under the management of Nortraship. The Code Letters LNAI were allocated and her port of registry was Oslo. Norvarg departed on 28 April to join Convoy ON 90, which had departed from Liverpool that day and arrived at Halifax on 15 May. She sailed on to New York, arriving on 18 May and departing two days later for Philadelphia, Pennsylvania, where she arrived on 21 May. Norvarg departed on 13 June for New York, arriving the next day. She then sailed to Boston, from where she sailed on 24 June as a member of Convoy BX 26, which arrived at Halifax on 26 June. She then joined Convoy HS 19, which departed on 30 June and arrived at Sydney on 2 July. Norvarg was a member of Convoy SC 90, which departed on 3 July and arrived at Liverpool on 16 July. She was carrying a cargo of steel bound for Newport, Monmouthshire. She left the convoy at the Belfast Lough on 15 July and joined Convoy BB 198, which departed on 16 July and arrived at Milford Haven, Pembrokeshire the next day. She arrived at Newport later that day.

Norvarg departed on 28 July for Milford Haven, arriving two days later. She sailed on 31 July to join Convoy ON 118, which departed from Liverpool on 1 August and dispersed at sea on 20 August. She was bound for the Hampton Roads, Virginia, United States, and then New York, which was reached on 21 August. Norvarg sailed on 23 August for Norfolk, Virginia, arriving on 25 August and sailing on 6 September for New York, where she arrived on 8 September. Norvarg was a member of Convoy SC 102, which departed on 19 September and arrived at Liverpool on 6 October. She was carrying general cargo and steel, She left the convoy at the Belfast Lough on 5 October, joining Convoy BB 227, which departed the next day and arrived at Milford Haven on 7 October. She arrived at Cardiff, Glamorgan later that day.

Norvarg departed from Cardiff on 27 October for Milford Haven, arriving the next day and departing the day after that to join Convoy ON 142, which departed from Liverpool on 30 October and arrived at New York on 21 November. Laden with a cargo of stores, she departed with Convoy SC 113 on 12 December. That convoy arrived at Liverpool on 2 January 1943. She left the convoy at Loch Ewe on 1 January, joining Convoy WN 379, which departed on 2 January and arrived at Methil, Fife on 4 January. She then joined Convoy FS1005, which departed on 6 January and arrived at Southend, Essex on 8 January. Her destination was Gravesend, Kent, where she arrived the next day.

Norvarg was a member of Convoy FN 938, which departed from Southend on 7 February and arrived at Methil on 9 February. She then sailed to Loch Ewe, where she arrived on 13 February. She then joined Convoy ON 167, which departed from Liverpool on 14 February and arrived at New York on 8 March. Norvarg was bound for Philadelphia, arriving on 10 March. She remained there for two months, departing on 11 May for New York, where she arrived the next day. Norvarg sailed on 13 May for Boston, where she joined Convoy BX 52, which departed on 18 May and arrived at Halifax on 20 May. She then joined Convoy SC 132, which departed on 26 May and arrived at Liverpool on 11 June. She was carrying general cargo and steel. Norvarg left the convoy at the Belfast Lough on 11 June, joining Convoy BB 299, which departed that day and arrived at Milford Haven on 13 June. Her destination was Newport, where she arrived later that day.

Norvarg departed on 29 June for Milford Haven, arriving on 1 July and departing the next day to join Convoy ONS 12, which departed from Liverpool on 3 July and arrived at Halifax on 18 July. She was carrying a cargo of coal. Laden with general cargo, she returned to the United Kingdom with Convoy SC 140, which departed on 21 August and arrived at Liverpool on 5 September.

On 19 September, Norvarg sailed to Ellesmere Port, Cheshire, returning to Liverpool on 23 September. She was a member of Convoy KMS 28G, which departed on 26 September and arrived at Gibraltar on 7 October. She was carrying a cargo of coal and vehicles, bound for Algiers, Algeria. She joined Convoy KMS 28, which departed from Gibraltar on 7 October and arrived at Port Said on 19 October. She left the convoy at Philippeville, Algeria on 11 October. Norvarg departed on 15 October, joining Convoy GUS 18, which had departed from Alexandria, Egypt on 9 October and arrived at the Hampton Roads on 6 November. She left the convoy at Algiers, on 16 October. She sailed ten days later to join Convoy GUS 19, which had departed from Alexandria on 19 October and arrived at the Hampton Roads on 15 November. Norvarg left the convoy at Casablanca, Morocco, on 29 October, departing on 3 November to join Convoy MKS 29G, which had departed from Gibraltar on that day and arrived at Liverpool on 18 November. She sailed on to Loch Ewe, arriving later that day and joining Convoy WN 507, which departed on 19 November and arrived at Methil on 21 November. Norvarg then joined Convoy FS 1279, which departed that day and arrived at Southend on 23 November. She left the convoy at Harwich, Essex on 23 November, and sailed to Ipswich, Suffolk, arriving on 25 November.

Norvarg departed Ipswich on 10 December, joining Convoy FN 1201, which had departed from Southend on that day and arrived at Methil on 12 December. She left the convoy at Hartlepool, Co Durham on 10 December and then rejoined it to sail to Hull, Yorkshire, where she arrived the next day. She departed on 21 December to join Convoy FN 1212, which had departed from Southend that day and arrived at Methil on 23 December. Loch Ewe was reached on 25 December via Convoy EN 323. Norvarg then joined Convoy KMS 37G, which departed from Liverpool that day and arrived at Gibraltar on 7 January 1944. Convoy OS 63 was combined with this convoy, separating on 7 January and reaching Freetown, Sierra Leone on 17 January. Norvarg was bound for Naples, Italy. She joined Convoy KMS 37, which departed from Gibraltar on 9 January and arrived at Port Said on 20 January. She left the convoy at Philippeville, on 12 January, departing the next day to join Convoy UGS 28, which had departed from the Hampton Roads on 25 December 1943 and arrived at Port Said on 21 January 1944. Norvarg left the convoy at Augusta, Sicily, Italy, on 15 January. She was a member of Convoy AH 20, which departed on 22 January and arrived at Bari on 24 January. She left the convoy at Taranto on 24 January, departing on 8 February to join Convoy HA 23, which had departed from Bari that day and arrived at Augusta on 10 February. She departed on 24 February to join Convoy MKS 41, which had departed from Port Said on 19 February and arrived at Gibraltar on 2 March. She then joined Convoy MKS 41G, which departed that day and rendezvoused at sea with Convoy SL 150 on 3 March. The combined convoys arrived at Liverpool on 14 March. Norvarg was carrying a cargo of lemons, scrap metal and sulphur. She sailed on to Loch Ewe, arriving later that day. She then joined Convoy WN 557 to Methil and Convoy FS 1394 to Southend, where she arrived on 19 March. Her destination was Gravesend, where she arrived that day.

Norvarg was a member of Convoy FN 1307, which departed from Southend on 25 March and arrived at Methil on 27 March. She left the convoy at North Shields, Northumberland on 25 March. She sailed on 23 April for sea trials, returning to North Shields the next day. Norvarg then joined Convoy FN 1341, which had departed from Southend on 28 April and arrived at Methil on 30 April. She then sailed to Loch Ewe with Convoy EN 378, which departed on 2 May and arrived the next day. Norvarg the joined Convoy ON 236, which departed from Liverpool on 11 May and arrived at New York on 27 May. She then joined Convoy NG 438, which departed on 31 May and arrived at Guantanamo Bay, Cuba on 6 June. She then joined Convoy GAT 140, which departed that day and arrived at Trinidad on 12 June. She left the convoy at San Pedro de Macorís, Dominican Republic, on 9 June. Norvarg sailed on 18 June for Guantanamo Bay, arriving two days later. She was a member of Convoy GN 140, which departed on 22 June and arrived at New York on 29 June. She then joined Convoy HX 298, which departed on 3 July and arrived at Liverpool on 18 July. She was carrying a cargo of sugar cane bound for the Clyde. where she arrived on 18 July. She departed from the Clyde on 20 July and sailed to Liverpool, arriving three days later.

Norvarg was a member of Convoy ON 248S, which departed from Liverpool on 10 August and arrived at New York on 27 August. She then joined Convoy NG 456, which departed on 29 August and arrived at Guantanamo Bay on 4 September. She then sailed to Santiago de Cuba, arriving the next day. Norvarg returned to Guanatanamo Bay, joining Convoy GN 157, which departed on 15 September and arrived at New York on 22 September. She departed from New York on 27 September for Boston, from where she sailed on 29 September as a member of Convoy BX127, which arrived at Halifax on 1 October. She then joined Convoy SC 158, which departed on 4 October and arrived at Liverpool on 18 October. She was carrying a cargo of sugar cane.

Norvarg sailed on 29 December for the Belfast Lough, arriving the next day. On 12 January 1945, she joined Convoy ONS 40, which had departed from Liverpool that day and arrived at Halifax on 30 January. She then joined Convoy XB 144, which departed on 29 January and arrived at the Cape Cod Canal, Massachusetts, on 1 February. She arrived at New York on 2 February. She then joined Convoy NG 489, which departed on 10 February and arrived at Guantanamo Bay on 17 February. She left the convoy at Nuevitas, Cuba on 16 February. She then sailed to Santa María del Mar, from where she departed on 6 March for Guantanamo Bay, arriving the next day. Norvarg was one of three ships that formed Convoy GN 192, which departed on 9 March and arrived at New York on 15 March. She sailed on 20 March for Boston, arriving three days later. Norvarg then joined Convoy BX 152, which departed on 23 March and arrived at Halifax two days later. She then joined Convoy SC 171, which departed on 27 March and arrived at Liverpool on 10 April. Norvarg was carrying a cargo of sugar cane. She then sailed to Milford Haven to join Convoy BTC 125, which departed on 11 April and arrived at Southend on 14 April. Her destination was Gravesend, where she arrived on 15 April.

=== Post-war ===
Norvarg was a member of Convoy ON 301, which departed from Southend on 6 May and arrived at New York on 22 May. She sailed on 25 May for Puerto Tarafa, Cuba, where she arrived on 30 May, departing on 6 June for Falmouth, Cornwall, United Kingdom, arriving on 23 June. She sailed to The Downs, off the coast of Kent the next day, and then to Dundee, Angus, arriving on 27 June. She sailed on 13 July for Phildadelphia, arriving on 26 July and sailin on 3 August for Liverpool, where she arrived on 18 August. Norvarg sailed on 8 September for Norfolk, arriving on 24 September and sailing on 3 October for Montreal, Quebec, Canada, where she arrived on 13 November. She sailed on 22 November for Southampton, Hampshire, United Kingdom arriving on 5 December and sailing that day for Antwerp, Belgium, arriving the next day. She departed from Antwerp on 16 December, with a stated destination of New York. She arrived at Baltimore, Maryland on 18 January 1946, sailing on 2 February for Kirkwall, Orkney Islands, United Kingdom and Trondheim, Norway. Kirkwall was reached on 18 February. Norvarg sailed for Trondheim that day.

In 1946, Norvarg was sold to Wallem & Co, Shanghai, China. She may have been operated under the Panamanian flag. She was operated by the Nan Way Steam Ship Co. In 1947, she was renamed Nan Chiang. In 1950, she was sold to the Great Northern Shipping Co Ltd, Hong Kong and renamed Northern Glow, under the British flag. In 1959, she was sold to the Chinese Government and renamed Hoping 46 (Hoping Ssu Shi Liu). She was removed from the shipping registers in 1971.
