= Pelion (Thessaly) =

Town in ancient Thessaly

Pelion or Pelium (Ancient Greek: Πήλιον) was a town in ancient Thessaly. It is unlocated.
