= SS Beljeanne =

History
- Name: Empire Ethelbert (1946–47); Beljeanne (1947–64); Southern Cross (1964–66); Southern Hope (1966–68); Virginia Second (1968–69)
- Owner: Ministry of Transport (1946–47); Belships Co Ltd (1947–64); Bacong Shipping Co SA (1964–68); Peoples Bank & Trust Co (1968–69)
- Operator: C Smith & Co (1947–64); Southern Industrial Projects Inc (1964–68); M M Shipping Lines Inc (1968–69)
- Port of registry: (United Kingdom) Barrow-in-Furness (1946–47); (Norway) Oslo (1947-64); Panama City (1964–68); (Philippines) Manila (1968–69)
- Builder: Vickers-Armstrongs, High Walker
- Yard number: 95
- Launched: 14 August 1946
- Completed: January 1947
- Identification: call sign GKMP (1946–47); call sign LMCX (1947–64)
- Fate: Scrapped 1969

General characteristics
- Type: heavy-lift ship
- Tonnage: 7,843 GRT; 4,472 NRT; 10,330 DWT
- Length: 451 ft 10 in (137.72 m)
- Beam: 66 ft 1 in (20.14 m)
- Depth: 26 ft 0 in (7.92 m)
- Installed power: 6,800 hp
- Propulsion: 2 steam turbines
- Speed: 15 knots (28 km/h)

Beljeanne was a 7,843 GRT heavy-lift ship that was built in 1946 for the British Ministry of Transport. She was completed in 1947 as Beljeanne for the Norwegian company Belships. In 1964 she was sold to a Panamanian company and renamed Southern Cross, being renamed Southern Hope in 1966 before a sale to a Filipino bank in 1968 and renaming to Virginia Second. She served until 1969, when she was scrapped.

== Description ==
The ship was built in 1946 by Vickers-Armstrongs Ltd, High Walker, Newcastle-upon-Tyne, England. She was yard number 95.

The ship was 469 feet 10 inches (143.21 m) long, with a beam of 66 feet 1 inch (20.14 m). She had a depth of 26 feet 1 inch (7.95 m). She was assessed at 7,843 GRT, 4,472 NRT, 10,330 DWT.

The ship was propelled by two steam turbines. The turbines were made by Metropolitan-Vickers, Manchester, Lancashire. They were rated at 6,800 nhp. They could propel her at 15 knots (28 km/h).

== History ==
Empire Ethelbert was built for the Ministry of Transport, London. She was launched on 14 August 1946. Her port of registry was to be Barrow-in-Furness and her call sign was GKMP, but she was in fact registered in Newcastle-upon-Tyne where she was built.

Empire Ethelbert was completed in January 1947 as Beljeanne for Belships Co Ltd, Oslo, Norway. Her call sign was LMCX. She was placed under the management of Christen Smith & Co, Oslo. In March 1964, Beljeanne was sold to Bacong Shipping Co SA, Panama City, Panama and renamed Southern Cross. She was managed by the Filipino company Southern Industrial Projects Inc. She was renamed Southern Hope in 1966. The ship was mortgaged to the Peoples Bank & Trust Co, Manila, Philippines. In 1968, the ship was sold to the bank in lieu of debts, and she was renamed Virginia Second. She was managed by M M Shipping Lines Inc, Manila. She served until 1969, arriving on 15 January at Aioi, Japan for scrapping.
