= SS Corrientes =

Corrientes was the name of two ships operated by Donaldson Line.

- SS Corrientes (1920), torpedoed and sunk in 1940
- SS Corrientes (1943), in service 1946–1954
