= Belships =

Norwegian shipping company

Belships ASA

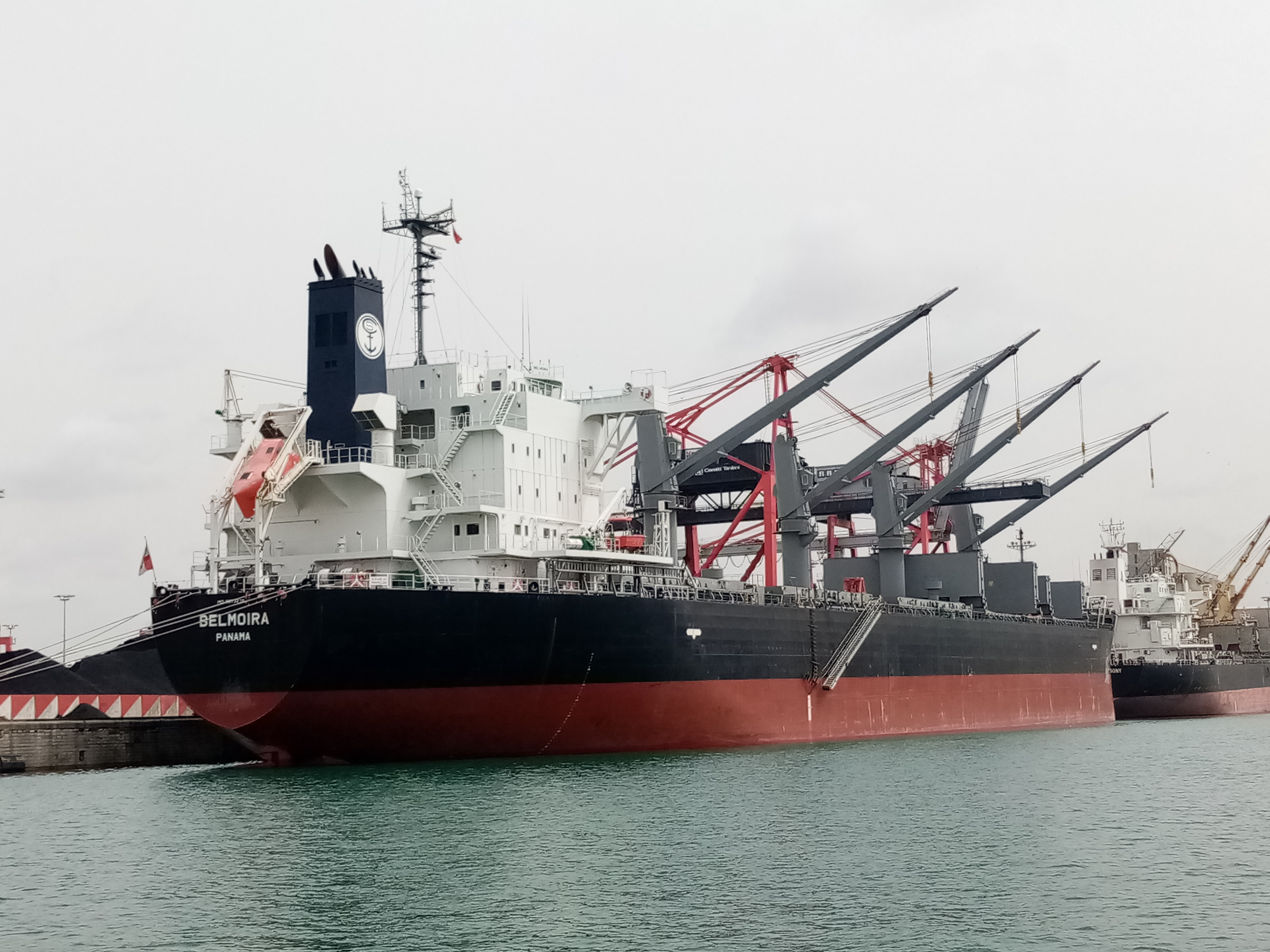
- Company type: Private
- Industry: Shipping
- Founded: 1918
- Headquarters: Oslo, Norway
- Key people: Christen Smith (founder), Lorentzen family (owners 1937–2018), Sverre J Tidemand (CEO), Asbjørn Larsen (Chairman)
- Revenue: US$51 million (2006)
- Operating income: $7 million (2006)
- Owner: EnTrust Global (74.99%); F. Laeisz (25.01%)
- Number of employees: 154 (2021)
- Website: www.belships.com

Belships is a private bulk carrier operator and ship management company with head offices in Oslo, Norway and a management subsidiary in Singapore. Belships manages a fleet of 42 ultramax bulk carriers, of which 10 are yet due for delivery as of August 2025.

Christen Smith founded the company in 1918 as Skibsaktieselskabet Christen Smiths Rederi, a pioneering heavy lift specialist. In 1937 the company was restructured, the brothers Axel, Frithjof and Jørgen Lorentzen took a controlling share and the company became listed on the Oslo Stock Exchange.

In the 1960s the company changed its specialism from heavy lift to bulk cargo. In 2018 Belships merged with the Lighthouse companies and the Lorentzen family ended its involvement with the company.

In 2025 Belships was acquired in a voluntary cash offer and subsequently delisted from the Oslo Stock Exchange. 74.99% of the company are now owned by Blue Ocean Funds, an investment fund managed by EnTrust Global, with the remaining 25.01% held by German shipping company F. Laeisz.

== Bibliography ==
- Dunn, Laurence (1973). Merchant Ships of the World in Colour 1910–1929. London: Blandford Press Ltd. ISBN 0-7137-0569-8.
