= MV Cressington Court =

British cargo ship built in 1943

History

United Kingdom
- Name: Empire Earl (1943–45); Cressington Court (1945–58); East Wales (1958–66); Universal Skipper (1966–70)
- Owner: Ministry of War Transport (1943–45); United British Steamship Co Ltd (1945–53); Court Line Ltd (1953–58); West Wales Steamship Co. Ltd(1958–66); Dalkeith Shipping Co Ltd (1966–70)
- Operator: Dodd, Thompson & Co. Ltd (1943–45); Haldin & Co Ltd (1945–58); Gibbs & Co Ltd (1958–66); International Steamship Co Ltd (1966-70)
- Port of registry: Sunderland (1944–45); London (1945–58); Newport (1958–66); Dalkeith (1966–70)
- Builder: William Doxford & Sons Ltd
- Yard number: 713
- Launched: 8 December 1943
- Completed: May 1944
- Out of service: November 1970
- Identification: UK Official Number 180132; call sign GBWQ
- Fate: Scrapped

General characteristics
- Type: Cargo ship
- Tonnage: 7,359 GRT; 5,008 NRT
- Length: 431 ft 0 in (131.37 m)
- Beam: 56 ft 5 in (17.20 m)
- Draught: 27 feet 4 3/4 inches (8.350 m)
- Depth: 35 ft 5 in (10.80 m)
- Installed power: 516 nhp
- Propulsion: 2SCSA diesel engine

Cressington Court was a 7,359 GRT cargo ship that was built in 1943 as Empire Earl by William Doxford & Sons Ltd, Sunderland, Co Durham, United Kingdom for the Ministry of War Transport (MoWT). In 1945, she was sold into merchant service and renamed Cressington Court. A further sale in 1958 saw her renamed East Wales. She was sold again in 1966 and renamed Universal Skipper, serving until she was scrapped in November 1970.

== Description ==
William Doxford & Sons Ltd, Sunderland, Co Durham built the ship in 1943 as yard number 713.

She was 431 feet 0 inches (131.37 m) long, with a beam of 56 feet 5 inches (17.20 m). She had a depth of 35 feet 5 inches (10.80 m), and a draught of 27 feet 4 3/4 inches (8.350 m). She was assessed at 7,359 GRT, 5,008 NRT.

The ship was propelled by a 516 nhp two-stroke single cycle, single action diesel engine, which had three cylinders of 23 5/8 inches (60 cm) diameter by 91 5/16 inches (231.9 cm) stroke driving a single screw propeller. The engine was built by Doxfords.

== History ==
=== World War II ===
Empire Earl was launched on 8 December 1943 and completed in May 1944. She was placed under the management of Dodd, Thompson & Co Ltd. She was allocated the United Kingdom official number 180132 and call sign GBWQ. Her port of registry was Sunderland. Her captain was Arthur Hawkins, who had been in command of Empire Sunrise when she was torpedoed and sunk in 1942 and had subsequently been master of the Fort ship Fort Carillon.

On 8 June 1944, Empire Earl made the first of many round trips from Southend, Essex to the Seine Bay, Seine-Maritime, France. These voyages were mostly as a member of various ETM and FTM convoys, and lasted until 30 August. No voyages are recorded until 30 October, when Empire Earl made a round trip to Methil, Fife via convoys FN 1526 and FS 1646, arriving back at Southend on 26 November. From 6 December until the end of the war, she made a number of round trips from Southend to Antwerp, Belgium as a member of various TAM and ATM convoys.

=== Post-war ===
After VE Day, Empire Earl made more round trips between Southend and Antwerp, the first four in convoy and then sailing independently. A final voyage in convoy was made in August when she sailed from Southend to the Seine Bay as a member of Convoy ETM 52, before sailing to Antwerp and resuming her previous schedule. She departed from London on 29 August 1945 for Newcastle upon Tyne, where she arrived two days later. She departed on 11 October for Antwerp, arriving two days later and departing on 25 October for Hamburg, Germany, where she arrived on 29 October. She departed on 19 November for the Tyne, where she arrived two days later.

In 1945 Empire Earl was sold to Sir Philip Haldin's United British Steamship Co Ltd, London, who renamed her Cressington Court and placed her under the management of Haldin & Co Ltd. In 1953, United British Steamship Co Ltd became Court Line Ltd. On 27 July 1954, Cressington Court was in collision with the Argentine Victory ship Marinero in the River Plate near Buenos Aires.

In 1958, Cressington Court was sold to West Wales Steamship Co. Ltd, Newport, Monmouthshire and was renamed East Wales. She was placed under the management of Gibbs & Co Ltd.

In 1966, East Wales was sold to Dalkeith Shipping Co Ltd, Dalkeith, Midlothian and was renamed Universal Skipper. She was operated under the management of International Steamship Co Ltd, Hong Kong. Universal Skipper was scrapped in November 1970 at Whampoa, Hong Kong.
