= USCGC Hollyhock (WAGL-220) =

Hollyhock-class tender of the United States Coast Guard

Coordinates: 26.218783°N 80.066233°W

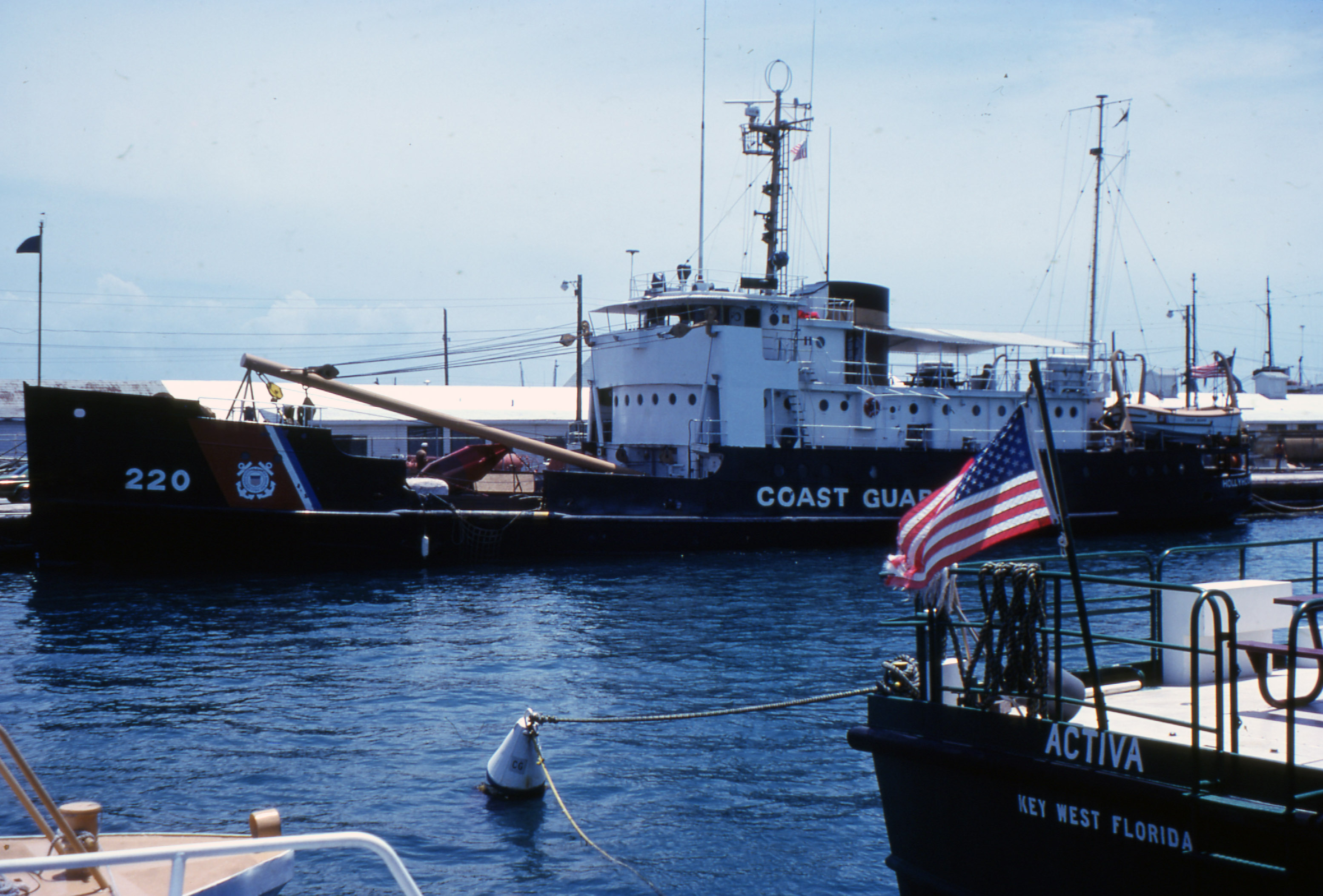
- USCGC Hollyhock

History

United States
- Name: Hollyhock
- Namesake: Hollyhock
- Awarded: 1934
- Builder: Defoe Boat & Motor Works
- Cost: $347,800
- Laid down: 13 April 1936
- Launched: 24 March 1937
- Sponsored by: Mrs. Geraldine Park
- Commissioned: 7 August 1937
- Decommissioned: 31 March 1982
- Reclassified: WLM-220, 1965
- Home port: Milwaukee
- Identification: Hull number: WAGL-220
- Honors and awards: See Awards
- Fate: Sunk as artificial reef, 1990

General characteristics
- Class & type: Hollyhock-class tender
- Displacement: 885 t (871 long tons)
- Length: 174 ft 10 in (53.29 m)
- Beam: 32 ft (9.8 m)
- Draft: 11 ft 3 in (3.43 m)
- Ice class: Reinforced bow and stern; Ice-belt at water-line; Notched forefoot
- Installed power: As built: 2 × Babcock & Wilcox watertube boilers; 1,000 shp (750 kW); 1954: 2 × Fairbanks-Morse diesel engines; 1,350 bhp (1,010 kW)
- Propulsion: 2 × triple-expansion steam engines; 2 × shafts
- Speed: 11.9 knots (22.0 km/h; 13.7 mph)
- Range: 113,400 mi (182,500 km) at 7.5 knots (13.9 km/h; 8.6 mph)
- Complement: 4 officers, 1 warrant officer, 69 enlisted (1945)
- Crew: 74 (1945); 38 (1966)
- Sensors & processing systems: 1945: SO-1 search radar; WEA-2 sonar; 1966: AN/SPM-11 search radar; UNQ-1 sonar

USCGC Hollyhock (WAGL-220) was the lead ship of the Hollyhock-class buoy tender built in 1937 and operated by the United States Coast Guard. The ship was named after an annual, biennial, or perennial plant usually taking an erect, unbranched form.

== Construction and career ==
Hollyhock was laid down by the Defoe Boat & Motor Works, in Bay City, Michigan on 13 April 1936, after construction was authorized in 1934. She was launched on 24 March 1937 and later commissioned on 7 August 1937, assigned to the 12th Lighthouse District in Milwaukee. She was relocated to Sturgeon Bay during World War II and designated WAGL-220.

In 1954, she was refitted with diesel engines. On 15 October 1954, she was dispatched to assist the collision between Dutch M/V Prins Willem V and tugboat Sinclair No.12. From 1 July 1958 until 14 September 1959. From 19 to 21 November, she assisted the M/V Carl D. Bardley in northern Lake Michigan. Hollyhock was transferred to Detroit, Michigan on 15 September 1959.

During the 1980 Mariel Boatlift, she participated in Coast Guard operations off Florida. Her purpose in Florida was to be responsible for buoys and aids to navigation in the Miami area. Hollyhock was decommissioned on 31 March 1982, due to budgetary issues and was later sold to a Mission Co. as Good News. Due to mechanical problems, she was stranded and towed to the Miami River, to be sold to the Florida Boating Improvement Program to become an artificial reef.

On 20 February 1990, she was sunk as an artificial reef off Pompano Beach, Florida. Her wreck lies in the Rodeo Reef and has been renamed "The Wreck of Captain Dan", in honor of Captain Dan Garnsey.

== Legacy ==
A later buoy tender, USCGC Hollyhock (WLB-214) was built in 2003 and named after the buoy tender Hollyhock which was decommissioned in 1982.

== Awards ==
- National Defense Service Medal
- Coast Guard Unit Commendation
- Humanitarian Service Medal
