= SS Possehl =

2,369 GRT cargo ship

History
- Name: Possehl (1921–45); Empire Exe (1945–47); Hermoupolis (1947–66); Pilion (1966–67); Nigma (1967–69)
- Owner: Possehl's Eisen und Kohlenhandel GmbH (1921–1935); Lübeck Line (1935-1945); Ministry of War Transport (1945–46); Ministry of Transport (1946–47); Greek Government (1947–48); T J Lavangras & Co (1948–66); P Perdikis (1966–67); Tina Shipping Co (1967–69)
- Operator: Possehl's Eisen und Kohlenhandel GmbH (1921–1935); Lübeck Line (1935-1945); unknown manager (1945–47); Greek Government (1947–48); T J Lavangras & Co (1948–66); P Perdikis (1966–67); Tina Shipping Co (1967–69)
- Port of registry: (Weimar Republic) Lübeck, Germany (1921–33); (Germany) Lübeck (1933–45); London, United Kingdom (1945–47); Greece (1947–67); Cyprus (1967–69)
- Builder: Howaldtswerke
- Launched: 1921
- Out of service: November 1967
- Identification: United Kingdom Official Number 180637 (1945-47); Code Letters PBVC (1921–34); Code Letters DRAQ (1934–45); Code Letters GLTV (1945–47)
- Fate: Scrapped

General characteristics
- Type: Cargo ship
- Tonnage: 2,369 GRT; 1,348 NRT
- Length: 307 ft 0 in (93.57 m)
- Beam: 42 ft 4 in (12.90 m)
- Depth: 19 ft 5 in (5.92 m)
- Installed power: 155 nhp
- Propulsion: Triple expansion steam engine, single screw propeller

Possehl was a 2,369 GRT cargo ship that was built in 1921 by Howaldtswerke, Kiel, Germany for a German shipping line. She was seized by the British in May 1945, passed to the Ministry of War Transport (MoWT) and renamed Empire Exe. In 1947, she was transferred to the Greek Government and renamed Hermoupolis. She was sold into merchant service in 1948 and used as a depôt ship. Following a sale in 1966, she was renamed Pilion. In 1967, she was sold to a Cypriot company and renamed Nigma. Laid up in November 1967 following boiler damage, she was scrapped in 1969.

== Description ==
The ship was built in 1921 by Howaldtswerke, Kiel.

The ship was 307 feet 0 inches (93.57 m) long, with a beam of 42 feet 4 inches (12.90 m). She had a depth of 19 feet 5 inches (5.92 m). She was assessed at 2,369 GRT, 1,348 NRT.

The ship was propelled by a 155 nhp triple expansion steam engine, which had cylinders of 20 1/16 inches (51 cm), 32 5/16 inches (82 cm) and 51 1/16 inches (130 cm) diameter by 35 7/16 inches (90 cm) stroke. The engine was built by Howaldtswerke and drove a single screw propeller.

== History ==
Possehl was built for Possehl's Eisen-und Kohlenhandel GmbH, Lübeck. The Code Letters PBVC were allocated and her port of registry was Lübeck. In 1934 the Code Letters DRAQ were allocated. In 1935 Possehl's shipping fleet including the Possehl was transferred to Lübeck Line, Lübeck.

In May 1945, Possehl was seized by the British at Lübeck. Declared a prize of war, she was passed to the MoWT and renamed Empire Exe. The United Kingdom Official Number 180637 and Code Letters GLTV were allocated. Her port of registry was London. In 1947, Empire Exe was transferred to the Greek Government and renamed Hermoupolis. She was sold to T J Lavrangas & Co in 1948 and used as a depôt ship. In 1966, Hermoupolis was sold to P Perdikis and renamed Pilion. She was sold to Tina Shipping Co, Cyprus in 1967 and renamed Nigma. In November 1967, she was laid up at Aden, South Yemen with boiler damage. Nigma arrived under tow at Karachi, Pakistan in November 1969 for scrapping.
