= List of Empire ships (Co–Cy) =

- List of Empire ships (A)
- List of Empire ships (B)
- List of Empire ships (Ca–Cl)
- List of Empire ships (Co–Cy)
- List of Empire ships (D)
- List of Empire ships (E)
- List of Empire ships (F)
- List of Empire ships (G)
- List of Empire ships (H)
- List of Empire ships (I–J)
- List of Empire ships (K)
- List of Empire ships (L)
- List of Empire ships (M)
- List of Empire ships (N)
- List of Empire ships (O)
- List of Empire ships (P)
- List of Empire ships (R)
- List of Empire ships (Sa–Sh)
- List of Empire ships (Si–Sy)
- List of Empire ships (Ta–Te)
- List of Empire ships (Th–Ty)
- List of Empire ships (U–Z)
- List of Empire ships built in the United States

== Suffix beginning Co to Cy ==
=== Empire Coast ===
Empire Coast was a 299 GRT coaster which was built by I Pimblott & Sons, Northwich, Cheshire. Launched on 9 January 1943 and completed in May 1943. Sold in 1946 to Anglo-American Oil Co Ltd and renamed Esso Ottawa. Scrapped in Bruges in April 1967.

=== Empire Cobbett ===
Empire Cobbett was a 9,811 GRT tanker which was built by Furness Shipbuilding Co Ltd, Haverton Hill-on-Tees. Launched on 19 November 1942 and completed in December 1942. Sold in 1945 to Eagle Oil and Shipping Company and renamed San Wilfrido. Arrived on 10 November 1959 at Hong Kong for scrapping.

=== Empire Coleridge ===
Empire Coleridge was a 9,798 GRT tanker which was built by Sir J Laing & Sons Ltd, Sunderland. Launched on 17 March 1942 and completed in May 1942. Sold in 1946 to Anglo-American Oil Co Ltd and renamed Esso Cheyenne. Sold in 1947 to Esso Petroleum Co Ltd. Arrived on 15 April 1961 at Boom, Belgium for scrapping.

=== Empire Collins ===
Empire Collins was a 9,796 GRT tanker which was built by Sir J Laing & Sons Ltd, Sunderland. Launched on 29 June 1942 and completed in December 1942. Sold in 1945 to The South Georgia Co Ltd and renamed Southern Collins. Operated under the management of Christian Salvesen & Co, Leith. Sold in 1956 to San Felicia Compagnia Navigazione SA, Panama and renamed Cassian Sailor. Sold in 1960 to Gulf Steamships Ltd, Karachi and renamed Mushtari. Scrapped in Karachi in February 1964.

=== Empire Colne ===
Empire Colne was a 1,923 GRT cargo ship which was built by Lübecker Maschinenbau-Gesellschaft, Lübeck. Seized in May 1945 as a war prize in an incomplete state at Stettin, completed at Lübeck as Empire Colne for MoWT. Sold in 1947 to Straits Steamship Co Ltd, Singapore and renamed Katong. Sold in 1971 to Greenland Ocean Lines Ltd, Singapore, and renamed Greengate. Sold in 1972 to Lam Kok Shipping Co, Singapore, and renamed Ever Glory. Scrapped in June 1974 in China.

=== Empire Comet ===
Empire Comet was a 6,978 GRT cargo ship which was built by Lithgows Ltd, Port Glasgow. Launched in November 1940 and completed in January 1941. Torpedoed on 12 June 1941 and sunk by U-136 west of the Hebrides (58°15′N 17°10′W).

=== Empire Comfort ===
Empire Comfort was a 1,333 GRT convoy rescue ship which was built by Ferguson Bros Ltd, Port Glasgow. Launched on 20 September 1944 as HMS York Castle. To MoWT on completion in December 1944 and renamed Empire Comfort. Laid up in 1954 at Falmouth. Sold in July 1955 to Belgian buyers and towed to Antwerp, intended to be refitted for service in the Belgian Congo but scheme abandoned. Scrapped in December 1955 in Ghent.

=== Empire Commerce (I) ===
Empire Commerce was a 3,857 GRT cargo ship which was built by J L Thompson & Sons Ltd, Sunderland. Launched in 1928 as Goodleigh. Sold in 1937 to Fisser & Van Doornum, Emden. Taken on 4 September 1939 as a war prize by Canadian authorities at Botwood, Newfoundland. To MoWT in 1940 and renamed Empire Commerce. Struck a mine on 9 June 1940 off Margate and severely damaged. Towed to Mucking Sands and beached. Cargo of woodpulp discharged but ship a constructive total loss. Scrapped in situ, she was the first Empire ship lost to enemy action.

=== Empire Commerce (II) ===
Empire Commerce was a 3,750 GRT cargo ship which was built by Sir J Laing & Sons Ltd, Sunderland. Launched on 23 December 1942 and completed in March 1943. Torpedoed on 1 October 1943 by U-410 north west of Philippeville, Algeria. broke in two sections, stern section sank, bow section towed to Algiers but gutted by fire.

=== Empire Conavon ===
Empire Conavon was a 1,570 GRT cargo ship which was built by Nylands Verk, Oslo. Launched in 1922 as Minna. Sold in 1935 to H Jeansson, Stockholm and renamed Britt. Operated under the management of Kalmar Rederei. Captured on 29 September 1939 by Kriegsmarine and taken as a war prize. Ownership assumed by German Government. Sold in 1944 to Leth & Co, Hamburg and renamed Leba. Seized in May 1945 at Lübeck. To MoWT and renamed Empire Conavon. Sold in 1947 to J Carlbom & Co Ltd, Hull and renamed Baltkon. Scrapped at Dunston on Tyne in 1959.

=== Empire Concave ===
Empire Concave was a 1,126 GRT cargo ship which was built by Schiffbau-Gesellschaft Unterweser AG, Bremen. Launched in 1939 as Luna for Neptun Line, Bremen. Requisitioned in 1940 by Kriegsmarine. Seized in May 1945 at Eckernförde. To MoWT and renamed Empire Concave. Allocated to Norway in 1946, to Norwegian Government and renamed Galtnes. Sold in 1947 to Per T Lykke, Norway, and renamed Ila. Sold in 1952 to L Figueiredo Navegação, Brazil and renamed Sao Leopoldo. Sold in 1965 to Casimiro Filho Industria Comercio, Brazil and renamed Mironave. Sold in 1982 to Petrosul, Brazil.

=== Empire Concern ===
Empire Concern was a 1,587 GRT cargo ship which was built by Flensburger Schiffbau-Gesellschaft, Flensburg. Launched in 1927 as Marquardt Petersen. Sold in 1935 to Flensburger Dampfschiffahrts Gesellschaft von 1869 and renamed Sexta. Sold in 1938 to H W Christophersen, Flensburg and renamed Annelis Christophersen. Seized in May 1945 at Flensburg. To MoWT and renamed Empire Concern. Allocated to Norway in 1946, to Norwegian Government and renamed Lasknes. Ran aground on 27 November 1946 at Ronglevær, Norway. Broke in two and sank.

=== Empire Concerto ===
Empire Concerto was a 1,569 GRT cargo ship which was built by Lübecker Maschinenbau-Gesellschaft. Launched in 1922 as Ingrid Horn. sold in 1926 to A/S D/S Thorunn, Norway, and renamed Margret. Sold in 1928 to J. Lauritzen A/S of Denmark and renamed Nelly. Sold in 1936 to Finska Line, Helsinki and renamed Corona. In October 1944 was at Holtenau under the Finnish flag. Unable to escape port and placed under the German flag in March 1945. Seized at Kiel in May 1945. To MoWT and renamed Empire Concerto. Returned in 1946 to Finska Line and renamed Corona. Scrapped in 1960 at Tyko Brok, Finland.

=== Empire Concession ===
Empire Concession was a 1,900 GRT cargo ship which was built by Neptun AG, Rostock. Launched in 1927 as Ernst Brockelmann for Ehrich Ahrens, Rostock. Seized in May 1945 at Flensburg. To MoWT and renamed Empire Concession. Sold in 1947 to Blandy Bros & Co, London and renamed Brazen Head. Sold in 1950 to Baltic Chartering A/B, Finland, and renamed Enso. Sold in 1959 to E Fagerstrom O/Y, Finland, and renamed Hakuni. Sold in 1966 to Mendez Moreno, Panama and renamed Isla Del Rey. Scrapped in June 1966 in Alicante, Spain.

=== Empire Conclyde ===
Empire Conclyde was a 1,409 GRT cargo ship which was built by AG Weser, Bremen. Launched in 1924 as Klio for Neptun Line, Bremen. Seized in May 1945 at Rendsburg. To MoWT and renamed Empire Conclyde. Allocated in 1946 to USSR and renamed Shota Rustavelli.

=== Empire Concord ===
Empire Concord was a 1,923 GRT cargo ship which was built by Deutsche Werft, Hamburg. Launched in 1944 as Deike Rickmers for Rickmers Rederei, Hamburg. Seized in May 1945 at Kiel. To MoWT and renamed Empire Concord. Allocated in 1946 to USSR and renamed Azov. Scrapped in March 1973 in Kure, Japan.

=== Empire Concourse ===
Empire Concourse was a 1,538 GRT cargo ship which was built by Neptun AG, Rostock. Launched in 1927 as Walter L M Russ for Ernst Russ, Hamburg. Seized in May 1945 at Schleswig. To MoWT, intended to be renamed Empire Concourse but ran aground on 15 July 1945 at Grassholm, Bristol Channel and wrecked.

=== Empire Concrete ===
Empire Concrete was a 1,696 GRT cargo ship which was built by Neptun AG, Rostock. Launched in 1927 as Theresia L M Russ for Ernst Russ, Hamburg. Seized in May 1945 at Copenhagen. To MoWT and renamed Empire Concrete. Allocated to the Netherlands in 1946, to Dutch Government and renamed Velsen. Sold in 1947 to Wm H Muller & Co NV, Rotterdam and renamed Cronenburgh. Sold in 1955 to U Gennari & Co, Italy, and renamed Astor. Operated under the management of Compagnia de Navigazione Cargo Carriers, Panama. Suffered boiler damage on 15 February 1970 between Algiers and Oran. Scrapped in April 1970 at Spezia, Italy.

=== Empire Condart ===
Empire Condart was a 310 GRT coaster which was built by Lidingö Nya Varv & Vaerkstaeder, Lidingö, Sweden. Launched in 1943 as Glucksberg for German owners. Renamed Stadt Glucksberg in 1944. Seized in May 1945 at Hamburg. To MoWT and renamed Empire Condart. Sold in 1947 to Plym Shipping Co Ltd, Plymouth and renamed Fredor. Lengthened in 1952, increased to 423 GRT. Sold in 1957 to Instone Lines Ltd, London, and renamed Seashell. Scrapped in December 1968 at Tamise, Belgium.

=== Empire Condee ===
Empire Condee was a 215 GRT coaster which was built by Van Diepen Scheepswerf Gebroeders NV, Waterhuizen, Netherlands. Launched in 1938 as Hermann Litmeyer for Maria Litmeyer, Haren-Ems, Germany. Seized in May 1945 at Nyborg, Denmark. To MoWT and renamed Empire Condee. Sold in 1947 to Plym Shipping Co, Plymouth and renamed Condee. Sold in 1950 to Wm H Muller & Co (London) Ltd and renamed Aisne. Sold in 1960 to Channel Shipping Ltd, Jersey and renamed Clary. Sold in 1976 to M Garzon, Tangier and renamed Marie Elizabeth. On 20 February 1976, she suffered a fire at Barcelona, severely damaged and declared a total loss.

=== Empire Conderton ===
Empire Conderton was a 1,558 GRT cargo ship built by Blyth Shipbuilding and Drydock Co Ltd. Launched in 1912 at Thyra Menier. Sold in 1918 to F Lecoeuvre, Belgium, and renamed Luis Pidal. Sold in 1925 to Puglisi & Tomasini, Italy and renamed Bellini. Sold in 1928 to August Bolten, Germany, and renamed Bollan. Sold in 1936 to Fisser & Van Doornum, Emden and renamed Lina Fisser. Seized in May 1945 at Kiel. To MoWT and renamed Empire Conderton. Sold in 1947 to J P Moschakis Ltd, London and renamed Marchmont. Sold in 1952 to A Moschakis Ltd, London and renamed Irene M. Sold in 1955 to Tampa Shipping Ltd, Nova Scotia. Sold in 1957 to Marine Industries Ltd, Montreal. Scrapped in October 1957 at Sorel, Canada.

=== Empire Condicote ===
Empire Condicote was a 1,000 GRT coaster which was built by Union Giesserei, Königsberg. Launched in 1923 as Pickhuben for H M Gehrckens, Hamburg. Seized in May 1945 at Lübeck. To MoWT and renamed Empire Condicote. Allocated in 1946 to Norway. To the Norwegian Government and renamed Grimsnes. Sold in 1947 to Stavanger Steamship Co, Stavanger and renamed Tungenes. Scrapped in June 1961 at Zalzate, Belgium.

=== Empire Condor (I) ===
Empire Condor was a 7,773 cargo ship which was built by Federal Shipbuilding and Drydock Company, Kearny, New Jersey. Launched in 1940 as Almeria Lykes for Lykes Bros Steamship Co. Transferred to MoWT in 1941 and renamed Empire Condor. To United States Maritime Commission in 1942 and renamed Almeria Lykes. Sunk on 13 August 1942 by E boats off Cape Bon, Tunisia at 36°40′N 11°35′E.

=== Empire Condor (II) ===
Empire Condor was a 998 GRT coaster which was built by Nordseewerke, Emden. Launched in 1926 as Amrum. Sold in 1931 to W Schuchmann, Bremerhaven and renamed Quersee. Seized in May 1945 at Brunsbüttel. To MoWT and renamed Empire Condor. Sold in 1947 to Akritas Navigation Co, London and renamed Mediterranean Trader. Sold in 1949 to South East Asia Shipping Co, Bombay and renamed Maharashmi. Ran aground on 10 June 1951 near Bhaktal Fort Lighthouse, India, and broke into three sections, a total loss.

=== Empire Condorrat ===
Empire Condorrat was a 998 GRT coaster which was built by Stettiner Oderwerke AG, Stettin. Launched in 1921 as Gunther Russ for Ernst Russ, Hamburg. Seized in May 1945, to MoWT and renamed Empire Condorrat. Sold in 1947 to Whitehaven Shipping Co, Whitehaven and renamed Kenton. Sold in 1950 to Ernst Russ, Hamburg, and renamed Gunther Russ. Scrapped in 1957 in Hamburg.

=== Empire Condover ===
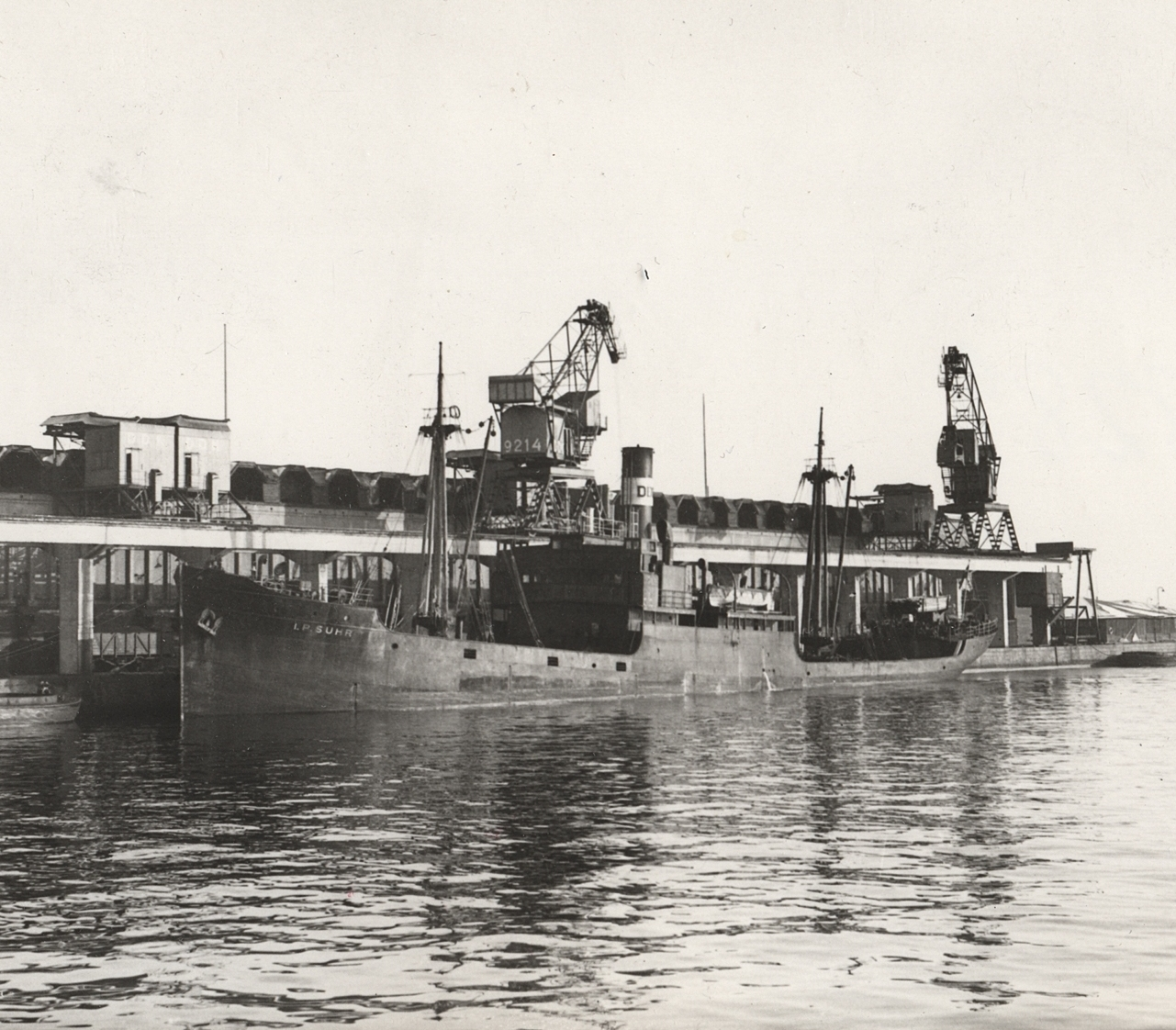
I. P. Suhr

Empire Condover was a 1,883 GRT cargo ship which was built by Ostseewerft AG, Stettin. Launched in 1926 as Siegmund. Sold in 1929 to Knohr & Burchard, Germany, and renamed Thielbeck. Sold in 1939 to Traber & Co, Hamburg and renamed Ingrid Traber. Seized in May 1945, to MoWT and renamed Empire Condover. Allocated in 1946 to Norway, to Norwegian Government and renamed Fornes. Sold in 1948 to Dansk Kulkompagnie, Denmark and renamed I P Suhr. Capsized and sank on 1 December 1950 5 nautical miles (9.3 km) off Sandhammaren, Sweden. The wreck was blown up in 1952 and the remains salvaged for scrap.

=== Empire Conexe ===
Empire Conexe was a 921 GRT coaster which was built by F Schichau GmbH, Elbing. Launched in 1912 as Badenia for A Kirsten, Hamburg. Renamed Titania in 1939, seized in May 1945 at Rendsburg. Transferred to MoWT and renamed Empire Conexe. Sold in 1947 to General Steam Navigation Co Ltd and renamed Ringdove. Scrapped in 1950 at Bo'ness.

=== Empire Confal ===
Empire Confal was a 960 GRT coaster which was built by Nüscke & Co, Stettin. Launched in 1912 as Borussia for A Kirsten, Hamburg. Renamed Timandra in 1939. Seized in May 1945 at Rendsburg. To MoWT and renamed Empire Confal. Sold in 1947 to General Steam Navigation Co Ltd and renamed Woodwren. Renamed Artemis in 1953, the superstructure was scrapped and converted to a coal hulk. Scrapped in 1960 at Queenborough, Kent.

=== Empire Confederation ===
Empire Confederation was a 1,199 GRT cargo ship which was built by Nobiskrug Werft GmbH, Rendsburg. Launched in 1921 as Elbe for Bugsier Reederei, Hamburg. Seized in May 1945 at Copenhagen. To MoWT and renamed Empire Confederation. Allocated in 1946 to USSR, renamed Jose Dias. Scrapped in 1966 in USSR.

=== Empire Conference ===
Empire Conference was a 1,991 GRT cargo ship which was built by Gävle Varv AB, Gävle. Launched in 1943 as Aletta Noot for Franz Haniel & Cie. GmbH, Duisburg. Seized in May 1945 at Flensburg. To MoWT and renamed Empire Conference. Sold in 1946 to Glen & Co, Glasgow and renamed Narva. Foundered on 22 December 1957 at 57°28′N 03°00′E while going to the aid of Bosworth. Lost with all hands.

=== Empire Confidence ===
Empire Confidence was a 5,023 GRT cargo ship which was built by Howaldswerke, Kiel. Launched in 1935 as Düsseldorf for North German Lloyd. Bremen. Captured north of Antofagasta on 15 December 1939 by HMS Despatch while bound from Valparaíso, Chile to Montevideo, Uruguay. To MoWT in 1940 and renamed Poland. then Empire Confidence. Chartered in 1946 to Alexandria Navigation, Alexandria, Egypt and renamed Star of El Nil. To Lamport and Holt in 1950, renamed Spenser. Renamed Roscoe in 1955. Arrived at Bilbao, Spain for scrapping on 17 February 1962.

=== Empire Conforth ===
Empire Conforth was an 854 GRT coaster which was built by Howaldtswerke, Kiel. Launched in 1922 as Erna. Sold in 1930 to Ernst Russ, Hamburg. Seized in May 1945 at Kristiansand Norway. To MoWT and renamed Empire Conforth. Sold in 1947 to Cyprus Ship Management Co, Cyprus and renamed Troodos. Sold in 1952 to Compagnia Maritima Punta Burica SA, Costa Rica and renamed Burica. Sold in 1953 to Compagnia Santa Angelica, Costa Rica and renamed Dmitris. Sold in 1955 to Metropolitan Agencies Ltd, Panama, and renamed Cedar. Scrapped in 1958 in Hong Kong.

=== Empire Congerstone ===
Empire Congerstone was a 987 GRT coaster which was built by Schiffbau-Gesellschaft Unterweser AG, Bremen. Launched in 1920 as Faust. Sold in 1926 to R Bornhofen, Germany and renamed Nordmark. Renamed Angeln in 1936. Sold in 1944 to P Arlt & Co, Germany and renamed Ermland. Seized in May 1945 at Lübeck. To MoWT and renamed Empire Congerstone. Sold in 1947 to Oakley Steamship Company, London, and renamed Oakley. Sold in 1949 to Goodwin Steamship Company, London, and then in 1950 to Anthony & Bainbridge Ltd. Sold in 1953 to Navigazione de Transportes San José, Costa Rica, and renamed Lucy. Scrapped in 1960 in Vado, US.

=== Empire Congham ===
Empire Congham was a 1,499 GRT cargo ship which was built by Helsingørs Jernskib-og Maskinbyggeri A/S, Helsingør. Launched in 1899 as Soderhamn for H M Gehrkens, Hamburg. Seized in May 1945 in Kiel. To MoWT and renamed Empire Congham. Reverted in 1947 to H M Gehrkens and renamed Soderhamn. Scrapped in 1958 in Hamburg.

=== Empire Congleton ===
Empire Congleton was a 1,027 GRT cargo ship which was built by Stettiner Oderwerke AG, Stettin. Launched in 1937 as Saar for R C Gribel, Stettin. Seized in May 1945 at Kolding, Denmark. To MoWT and renamed Empire Congleton. Allocated in 1946 to USSR and renamed Donetz.

=== Empire Congo ===
Empire Congo was a 1,059 GRT cargo ship which was built by Nüscke & Co, Stettin. Launched in 1923 as Rhenania. Sold in 1924 to E Halm & Co, Germany, and renamed Marth Halm. Sold in 1926 to A/B Bore, Finland, and renamed Bore VII. Sold in 1937 to August Bolten, Germany, and renamed Götaälv. Sold in 1938 to Schute & Bruns, Emden and renamed Bernhard Schulte. Sank on 3 March 1941 off Lofoten Islands, Norway. Salvaged and repaired, seized in May 1945 at Flensburg. To MoWT and renamed Empire Congo. Sold in 1947 to Anthony & Bainbridge Ltd and renamed Coquetside. Sold in 1951 to C Cosulich, Sicily and renamed Deneb. Sold in 1958 to Nautica SpA, Sardinia, scrapped in October 1966 in Spezia.

=== Empire Congress ===
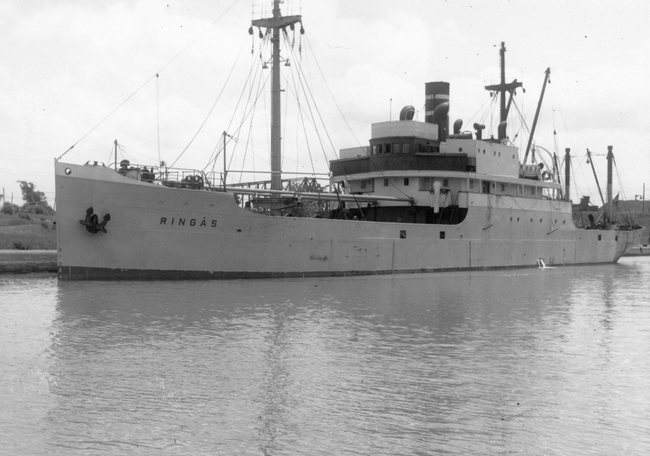
Ringås

Empire Congress was a 1,442 GRT cargo ship which was built by Deutsche Werft, Hamburg. Launched in 1922 as Arcadia. Sold in 1934 to Kohlen-Import und Poseidon Schiffahrt, Königsberg and renamed Elbing. Seized in May 1945 in the River Elbe. To MoWT and renamed Empire Congress. Allocated in 1946 to Norway, to Norwegian Government and renamed Brunes. Sold in 1947 to R Mithassel, Norway, and renamed Skuld. Sold in 1948 to Birger Ekerholt, Norway and renamed Ringås. Sold in 1958 to C T Trapezountios, Liberia and renamed Los Mayas. Renamed Francisco Morazan in 1959. Ran aground on 29 November 1960 at South Manitou Island, Lake Michigan. Salvage commenced on 8 December 1960 but was abandoned due to bad weather, ship declared a total loss.

=== Empire Congreve ===
Empire Congreve was a 250 GRT coaster which was built by Schulte & Bruns, Emden. Launched in 1939 as Klaus Wilhelm for Schulte & Bruns. Seized in May 1945 in the Channel Islands. To MoWT and renamed Empire Congreve. Allocated in 1946 to USSR, renamed Koida.

=== Empire Conifer ===
Empire Conifer was a 1,279 GRT cargo ship which was built by Nordseewerke, Emden. Launched in 1935 as Adrian for Ernst Komrowski, Hamburg. Seized in May 1945 at Copenhagen. To MoWT and renamed Empire Conifer. Chartered to Australian Government at 1d per annum while still in Prize Court. Allocated in 1946 to Australia. Delivered in December 1946 to Fremantle for Department of Shipping & Transport, Australian Government. Refitted in 1947 at Sydney. To Australian Shipping Board and renamed Nyora. Sold in 1953 to J Burke, Australia. Sold in 1963 to Robin & Co, Panama, then resold to Kie Hock Shipping Co, Singapore, and renamed Selat Singkep. Sold in 1964 to Compagnia de Navigazione Gatun SA, Panama and renamed Molopo. Renamed Anban later that year. Sold in 1965 to Compagnia Navigazione Thompson SA, Panama and renamed Basongo. Renamed Medduno in 1966, and then Mesawa in 1969. Sold in 1976 to Uni-Ocean Lines, Singapore, and renamed Forevergreen. Renamed Majullah in 1977. Arrested in 1977 in Malaysia. Auctioned in 1978 in Kuala Lumpur to Haw Ben Hock, Singapore and renamed Jayawang. Sank on 23 July 1978 near Bangkok. Raised in November 1979 and moved to an anchorage nearer to Bangkok but sank again a total loss.

=== Empire Coningsby ===
Empire Coningsby was a 1,289 GRT cargo ship which was built by Lübecker Maschinenbau Gesellschaft, Lübeck. Launched in 1938 as Adler for Argo Line, Bremen. Requisitioned in 1939 by the Kriegsmarine. Seized in May 1945 at Vordingborg, Denmark. To MoWT and renamed Empire Coningsby. Allocated in 1946 to the Netherlands, to Dutch Government and renamed Margeca. Sold in 1947 to Wm H Muller & Co, Rotterdam, and renamed Wickenburgh. Sold in 1963 to F C Georgopoulos, Greece, and renamed Nissos Thassos. Sold in 1970 to Scandinavia-Baltic-Mediterranean Shipping Co, Greece and renamed Savilco. Scrapped in June 1984 in Piraeus.

=== Empire Conington ===
Empire Conington was a 1,289 GRT cargo ship which was built by F Krupp AG, Emden. Launched in 1920 as Orlanda. Sold in 1920 to Argo Line, Bremen. Seized in May 1945 at Hamburg. To MoWT and renamed Empire Conington. To Railways and Steamships department of the Government of Newfoundland in 1946. Sold in 1949 to Société Anonyme Maritime et Commerciale, Panama and renamed Alabe. Scrapped in 1958 in Sunderland.

=== Empire Conisborough ===
Empire Conisborough was a 1,237 GRT cargo ship which was built by Lübecker Flender-Werke AG, Lübeck. Launched in 1937 as Marie Fisser for Fisser & Van Doornum, Emden. Seized in May 1945 at Emden in a damaged condition. To MoWT and renamed Empire Conisborough. Allocated to USSR in 1946 and renamed Stepan Shaumian.

=== Empire Coniston ===
Empire Coniston was a 1,878 GRT cargo ship which was built by AG Weser, Bremen. Launched in 1925 as Sorrento. Sold in 1928 to Neptun Line, Bremen. Put into Vigo, Spain in 1941 and surrendered to Britain there in May 1945. Sailed to the UK in August 1945. To MoWT and renamed Empire Coniston. Transferred to Danish Government on a temporary basis in 1946 and allocated to Denmark in 1947. Sold to Ove Skou, Denmark, and renamed Birgitte Skou. sold in 1959 to M Martini, Italy, and renamed N Martini. Renamed Nicolo Martini in 1961. Grounded on 24 April 1972 at Portoscuso, Sardinia. Refloated but declared a total loss. Sold in December 1972 and scrapped in October 1973 at Vado Ligure, Italy.

=== Empire Conjuror ===
Empire Conjuror was a 512 GRT bucket dredger which was built by Fleming & Ferguson Ltd, Paisley. Launched on 5 October 1944 and completed in December 1944. sold in 1946 to Superintendent Civil Engineer, Bombay. Sold in 1947 to Mitchell Engineering Group, London. Sold in 1948 to Ministry of Public Works, Turkey and renamed Seyhan. Sold in 1985 to Bayindrik Bakanligi Makina Ve Ikmel, Turkey.

=== Empire Conlea ===
Empire Conlea was a 261 GRT coaster which was built by Nobiskrug Werft GmbH, Rendsburg. Launched in 1939 as Gunther Harmann. Seized in 1945, to MoWT and renamed Empire Conlea. Sold in 1950 to Jeppesen, Heaton Ltd, London and renamed Conlea. Foundered on 10 February 1956 15 nautical miles (28 km) off La Corbière, Jersey.

=== Empire Conleith ===
Empire Conleith was a 1,406 GRT cargo ship which was built by Deutsche Werft, Hamburg. Launched in 1922 as Ambria. Sold in 1934 to Kohlen-Import Poseidon Schiffahrt AG, Königsberg and renamed Gumbinnen. Sank on 3 March 1941 off Lofoten Islands, Norway. Salvaged and repaired. Seized in May 1945 at Flensburg. To MoWT and renamed Empire Conleith. Allocated in 1946 to Norway. To the Norwegian Government and renamed Dragnes. Sold in 1947 to K Andersen & Co, Norway, and renamed Mimona. Sold in 1959 to T Halvorsen A/S, Norway, and renamed Malay. Scrapped in March 1961 in Grimstad, Norway.

=== Empire Conleven ===
Empire Conleven was a 1,642 GRT cargo ship which was built by Furness Shipbuilding Co Ltd, Haverton Hill-on-Tees. Launched in 1930 as Edenhurst. Sold in 1937 to A/B Dalhbery O/Y, Finland, and renamed Ilves. Sold in 1939 to Gluckauf Coal Handling Co, Rostock and renamed Gluckauf. Requisitioned in 1940 by Kriegsmarine, renamed Warnow. Seized in May 1945 at Rendsburg. To MoWT and renamed Empire Conleven. Allocated in 1946 to USSR and renamed Alexandr Parkohomenko.

=== Empire Connah ===
Empire Connah was a 1,780 GRT cargo ship which was built by Neptun AG, Rostock. Launched in 1923 as Charlotte Cords for August Cords, Rostock. Seized in May 1945 at Travemünde. To MoWT and renamed Empire Connah. Allocated in 1946 to USSR and renamed Nikolai Bauman.

=== Empire Connaught ===
Empire Connaught was a 999 GRT coaster which was built by Stettiner Oderwerke AG, Stettin. Launched in 1921 as Johannes C Russ for Ernst Russ, Hamburg. Wrecked on 21 October 1942 off Umeå, Sweden. Salvaged and repaired, seized in May 1945 at Flensburg. To MoWT and renamed Empire Connaught. Allocated in 1946 to USSR and renamed Nemirovich Danchenko. Scrapped in 1971 in USSR.

=== Empire Connell ===
Empire Connell was a 1,241 GRT cargo ship which was built by Sunderland Shipbuilding Co. Launched in 1908 as Odland. Sold in 1922 to Borre Damps, Norway, and renamed Odland 1. Sold in 1924 to D/s A/S Martha. Sold in 1928 to Rederei A/B Vasby, Sweden and renamed Brita. Seized on 9 April 1940 in Bergen by the Germans. To F G Rheingold, Danzig and renamed Desiderus Siedler. Seized in May 1945 at Copenhagen. To MoWT and renamed Empire Connell. Sold in 1947 to HP Lenaghan & Sons, Belfast and renamed Ballyholme Bay. Sold in 1951 to Pattison Orient Line Ltd, Hong Kong, and renamed Laure Pattison. Scrapped in 1952 in Hong Kong.

=== Empire Connemara ===
Empire Connemara was a 1,428 GRT cargo ship which was built by F Schichau GmbH, Elbing. Launched in 1924 as Heinrich Arp for F C Heinrich Arp, Hamburg. Seized in May 1945 at Hamburg. To MoWT and renamed Empire Connemara. Allocated in 1946 to USSR and renamed Liza Chaikina.

=== Empire Connie ===
Empire Connie was a 235 GRT tug which was built by A Hall & Co Ltd, Aberdeen. Launched on 10 July 1945 and completed in September 1945. Sold in 1946 to Royal Netherlands Navy and renamed Mies. Sold in 1947 to the Government of the Dutch East Indies. To Indonesian Navy in 1953 and Indonesian Government in 1958. Sold in 1978 to the Port Authority of Tanjung Priok, Indonesia and renamed Taluk Ambon.

=== Empire Conningbeg ===
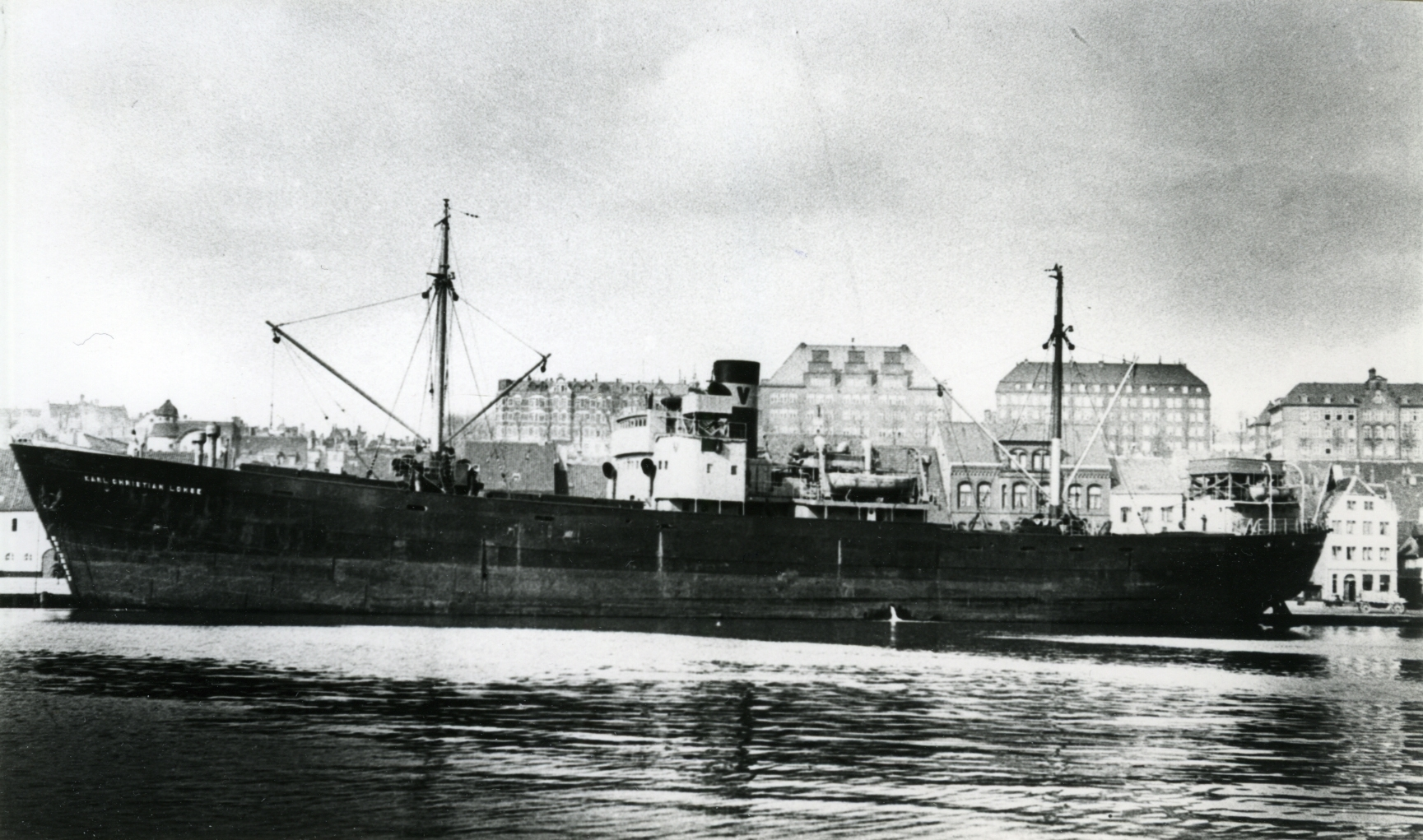
Karl Christian Lohse

Empire Conningbeg was a 1,875 GRT cargo ship which was built by Nobiskrug Werft GmbH, Rendsberg. Launched in 1940 as Justinian for H Reksten, Norway. Seized by Germany and completed as Karl Christian Lohse for HP Vith, Hamburg. Seized in May 1945 at Flensburg. To MoWT and renamed Empire Conningbeg. Allocated in 1946 to Norway. To the Norwegian Government and renamed Fuglenes. Returned in 1947 to H Reksten, Norway, and renamed Justinian. Sold in 1954 to H W Christophersen, Flensburg, and renamed Inge R Christophersen. Scrapped in May 1965 in Hamburg.

=== Empire Cononley ===
Empire Cononley was a 190 GRT schooner which was built by J Oelkers, Hamburg. Launched in 1922 as a barge named Lucy. Renamed Midgard I, Midgard IV and then Elisabeth before being fitted with a diesel engine in 1935 and renamed Dorothea Weber for H J G Weber, Hamburg. Seized in May 1945 at Guernsey. To MoWT and renamed Empire Cononley. Sold in 1947 to R H Hunt & Son and renamed Coverack. A new engine was fitted in 1951. Sold in 1953 to Hull Gates Shipping Co, Hull and renamed River Witham. Grounded on 28 July 1959 off Lowestoft, refloated but capsized and sank 4 nautical miles (7.4 km) northwest of Inner Dowsing Light Vessel.

=== Empire Conqueror ===
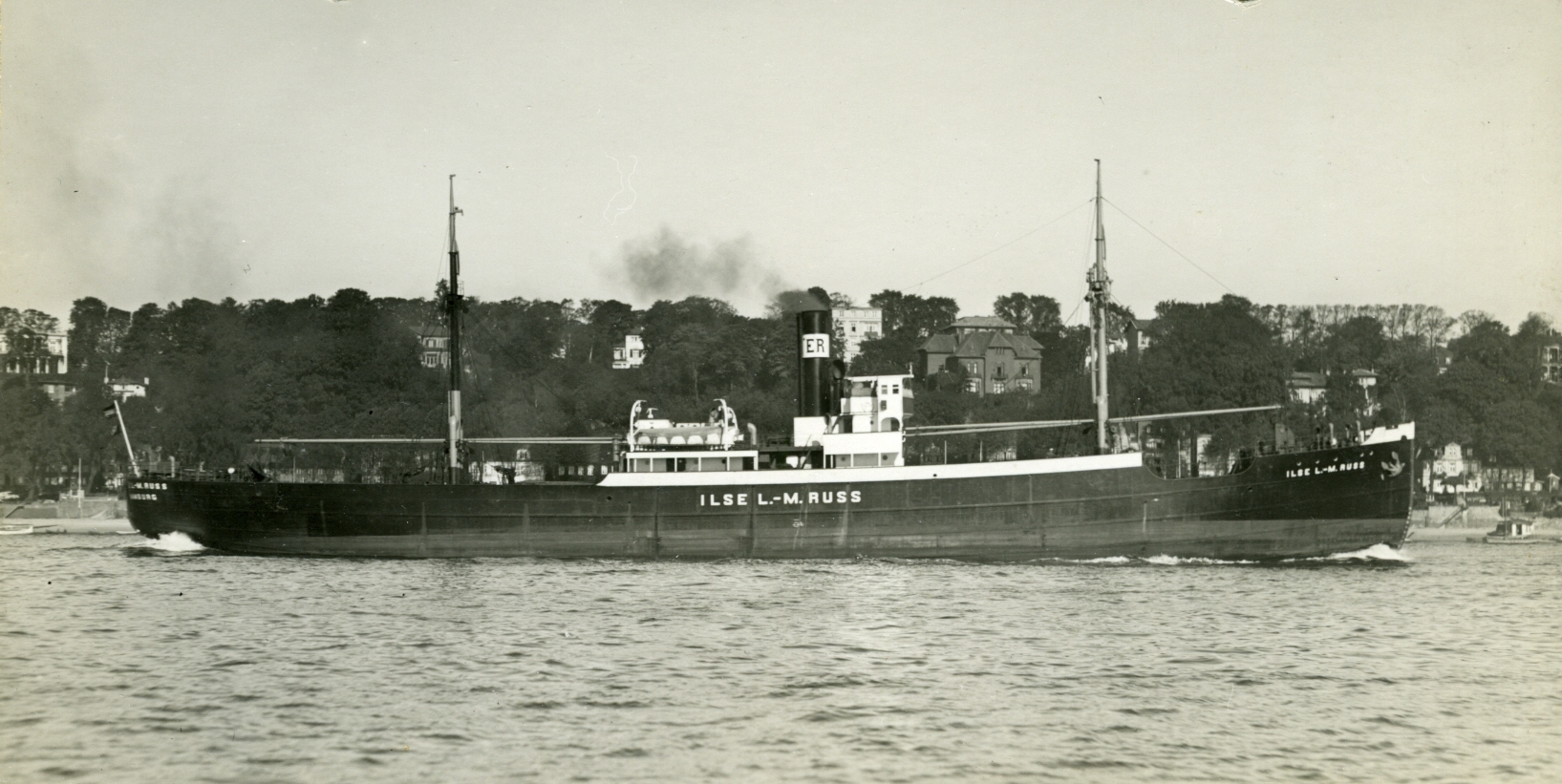
Ilse L-M Russ

Empire Conqueror was a 1,600 GRT cargo ship which was built by Flensberger Schiffbau Gesellschaft. Launched in 1926 as Ilse L M Russ for Ernst M Russ, Hamburg. Seized in May 1945 at Kiel. To MoWT and renamed Empire Conqueror. Allocated in 1946 to Norway. To the Norwegian Government and renamed Ekornes. Sold in 1947 to Bjorn Tetlie, Norway, and renamed Elfrida. On 8 December 1959, a leak developed in the engine room during a severe storm. The ship was abandoned the next day and sank the day after some 100 nautical miles (190 km) west of Stavanger, Norway.

=== Empire Conquest ===
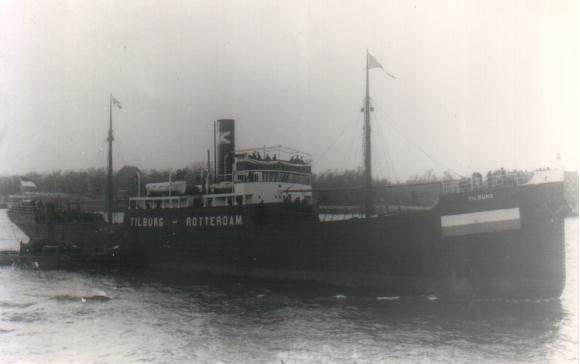
Tilburg

Empire Conquest was a 1,391 GRT cargo ship which was built by Smits Machinfabrieken, Kinderdijk. Launched in 1917 as Tilburg. Sold in 1922 to Baltische Reederei, Germany and renamed Ljusnealf. Sold in 1938 to Richard Schroder, Rostock and renamed Hubert Schroder. Seized in May 1945, to MoWT and renamed Empire Conquest. Sold in 1947 to British & Overseas Minerals Ltd, London and renamed Southern Island. Sold in 1951 to U Gennari Fu Torquato, Italy, and renamed Verax. Renamed Costance in 1960. Sold in 1962 to M Attansia, operated under the management of Costance Compagnia de Navigazione, Panama. Ran aground on 21 April 1966 at Lampedusa Island, a total loss.

=== Empire Conrad ===
Empire Conrad was a 7,009 GRT cargo ship which was built by Lithgows Ltd, Port Glasgow. Launched on 23 March 1942 and completed in May 1942. Sold in 1952 to P Atychiades, Marseille and renamed Franta. Sold in 1952 to Refast Steamship Co and renamed Nia. Operated under the management of Marcou & Sons Ltd, London. Sold in 1954 to Ocean Tramp Tankers Corporation, Panama, and renamed Eugenia. Scrapped in April 1967 in Niihama, Japan.

=== Empire Consent ===
Empire Consent was a 1,942 GRT cargo ship which was built by Van der Giessen, Krimpen aan den IJssel. Launched in 1944 as Eichberg for August Bolten, Hamburg. Seized in May 1945 at Bremerhaven. To MoWT and renamed Empire Consent. Sold in 1949 to Glen & Co, Glasgow and renamed Runa. Sold in 1964 to Seamasters Shipping Co, Greece, and renamed Karyatis. Scrapped in 1968 in Hong Kong.

=== Empire Consequence ===
Empire Consequence was a 1,998 GRT cargo ship which was built by Lübecker Maschinenbau, Lübeck. Launched in 1940 as Friedrich Bischoff. Sunk on 13 December 1943 at Bremen during an allied air raid. Salvaged, and seized in May 1945 at Copenhagen. To MoWT and renamed Empire Consequence. Allocated in 1947 to the US. To United States Maritime Commission. To Norton Clapp, Seattle in 1950. Sold in 1951 to Polttoaine Osuuskunta, Finland and renamed Kaisaniemi. Scrapped in November 1967 in Grimstad, Norway.

=== Empire Consett ===
Empire Consett was a 1,123 GRT cargo ship which was built by Nordseewerke, Emden. Launched in 1937 as Thalia for Neptun Line, Bremen. At Seville when war declared. Interned in April 1943 at Cádiz. Surrendered in May 1945 to Britain, Arrived on 25 August 1945 at Falmouth after suffering engine trouble en route. On 12 September 1945, she was towed to Cardiff. To MoWT and renamed Empire Consett. Allocated in 1946 to USSR, renamed Akademik Karpinsky. Foundered on 31 August 1953 while on a voyage between Kaliningrad and Amsterdam.

=== Empire Consistence ===
Empire Consistence was a 1,771 GRT cargo ship which was built by G Seebeck AG, Bremerhaven. Launched in 1927 as Ganter for Norddeutscher Lloyd. Seized in May 1945 at Copenhagen. To MoWT and renamed Empire Consistence. Sold in 1951 to Dutch buyers, renamed Jan Willem then Maria. Sold in 1951 to A Johannson, Finland, and renamed Dagny. Scrapped in April 1967 in Bremen.

=== Empire Consort ===
Empire Consort was a 1,175 GRT cargo ship which was built by Stettiner Oderwerke AG, Stettin. Launched in 1922 as Gisela L M Russ for Ernst Russ, Hamburg. Seized in May 1945 at Flensburg. To MoWT and renamed Empire Consort. Allocated in 1946 to Greece. To Greek Government and renamed Volos. Sold in 1948 to M A Karageorgis, Greece, and renamed Marios II. On 19 February 1959, she suffered a boiler explosion while on a voyage between Stratoni and Piraeus. Taken in tow but sank at 38°35′N 24°21′E.

=== Empire Constable ===
Empire Constable was a 1,560 GRT cargo ship which was built by Flensburger Schiffbau Gesellschaft, Flensburg. Launched in 1936 as Heinrich Schmidt for H Schmidt, Flensburg. Seized in May 1945 at Rendsburg. To MoWT and renamed Empire Constable. Allocated in 1946 to USSR and renamed Dimitry Laptev. Scrapped in 1971 in USSR.

=== Empire Constancy ===
Empire Constancy was a 535 GRT coaster which was built by Stettiner Oderwerke AG, Stettin. Launched in 1912 as Dollart for Bugsier Line, Hamburg. Seized in May 1945 at Copenhagen. To MoWT and renamed Empire Constancy. Sold in 1947 to S Hannan & Co, Fowey and renamed Polzeath. Sold in 1951 to Azize Arkan v. Ortaklari, Turkey and renamed Meltem. Sold in 1956 to Erpak Vap. Ithalkat Ihracat, Turkey and renamed Yener 9. Sold in 1959 to Zeki v. Ziya Son. Izzet Kirtil, Turkey and renamedYarasli. Sailed on 14 January 1961 from Istanbul bound for Bagnoli. Last reported on 25 January 1961 passing Kephalonia, presumed lost in the Ionian Sea.

=== Empire Constellation ===
Empire Constellation was a 1,057 GRT cargo ship which was built by Schiffs-und Dockbauw Flender, Lübeck. Launched in 1925 as Reval. Sold in 1934 to Mathies Reederei, Hamburg and renamed Memel. Seized in May 1945 at Flensburg. To MoWT and renamed Empire Constellation. Allocated in 1946 to USSR and renamed Ivan Sechenov.

=== Empire Constitution ===
Empire Constitution was a 1,598 GRT cargo ship which was built by Flensburger Schiffbau-Gesellschaft, Flensburg. Launched in 1929 at Peter Vith for H P Vith, Hamburg. Seized in May 1945 at Flensburg. To MoWT and renamed Empire Constitution. Allocated in 1946 to Norway. To the Norwegian Government and renamed Grannes. Sold in 1946 to Einar Wahlstrom, Norway and renamed Selnes. On 26 November 1950, she collided with City of Bristol off the West Barrow Buoy, Thames Estuary. Beached on West Barrow Sands, a total loss.

=== Empire Constructor ===
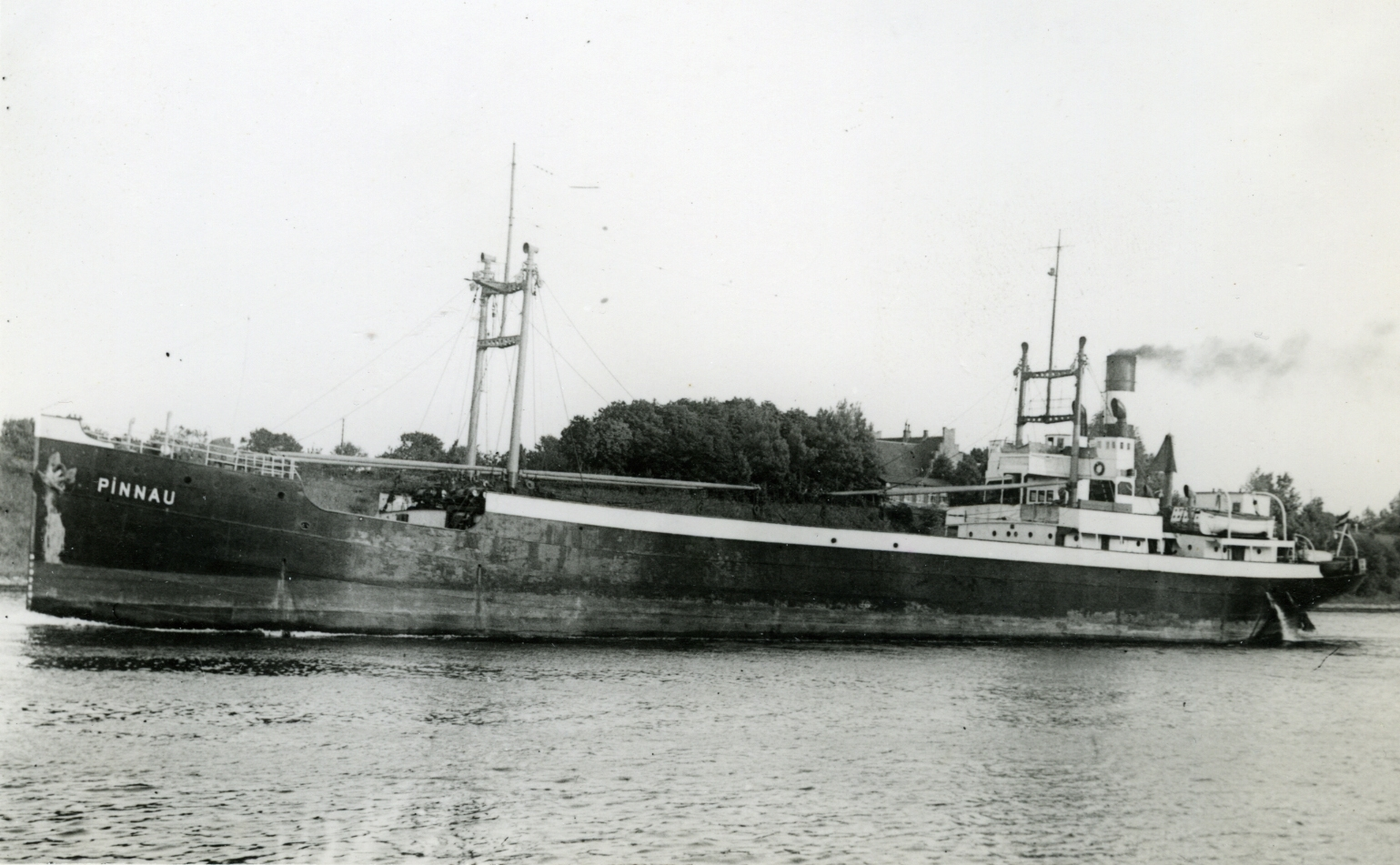
Pinnau

Empire Constructor was a 1,201 GRT cargo ship which was built by Nobiskrug Werft GmbH, Rendsburg. Launched in 1922 at Pinnau for Bugsier Line, Hamburg. Seized in May 1945 at Lübeck. To MoWT and renamed Empire Constructor. Sold in 1947 to J Carlbom & Co, Hull and renamed Estkon. Scrapped in 1959 in Newport, Monmouthshire.

=== Empire Consumer ===
Empire Consumer was a 1,258 GRT cargo ship which was built by Flensburger Schiffbau-Gesellschaft, Flensburg. Launched in 1939 as Haga for Mathies Reederei, Hamburg. Seized in May 1945 at Kiel. To MoWT and renamed Empire Consumer. Allocated in 1946 to Norway. To the Norwegian Government and renamed Hauknes. Sold in 1947 to Nordenfjeldske Dampskip A/S, Norway and renamed Orm Jarl. Sold in 1958 to Atlantska Plovidba, Yugoslavia and renamed Travnik. Sold in 1965 to Prekookeanska Plividba, Yugoslavia, and renamed Komovi. Sold in 1967 to N D Boukouvalas, Greece, and renamed Moschoula. Scrapped in April 1968 in Split, Yugoslavia.

=== Empire Contamar ===
Empire Contamar was a 199 GRT schooner which was built by Lübecker Flenderwerke AG, Lübeck. Launched in 1935 as Heimat for H Rubarth, Hamburg. Seized in May 1945 in Keil. To MoWT and renamed Empire Contamar. Grounded on 22 March 1947 in St Austell Bay. Refloated in June 1947 but a constructive total loss. Sold and rebuilt by a Clyde shipyard as a 248 GRT coaster for F J Tyrrell, Cardiff, renamed Tyrronall. Rebuilt again in 1950 and 1961. Sold in 1961 to J Tyrrell, Dublin. Sold in 1968 to A J Gough, Essex. Scrapped in June 1974 at Santander, Spain.

=== Empire Contay ===
Empire Contay was a 981 GRT coaster, which was built by H C, Stulcken Sohn, Hamburg. Launched in 1918 as Malmö for Bismark Line, Hamburg. Struck a mine on 1 June 1942 and sank southwest of Malmö. Salvaged and repaired. Seized in May 1945 at Schlei. To MoWT and renamed Empire Contay. Sold in 1947 to Oddsson & Co Ltd and renamed Reykjanes. Sold in 1949 to Endeavour Shipping Co, Edinburgh. Scrapped in May 1953 at Rosyth, Dunbartonshire.

=== Empire Contees ===
Empire Contees was a 1,923 GRT cargo ship which was built by Burmeister & Wain, Copenhagen. Launched in 1944 as Irene Oldendorff for E Oldendorff, Lübeck. Reported on 14 September 1944 to be in a damaged condition at Copenhagen. Repaired but again in a damaged condition in March 1945. Seized in May 1945 at Lübeck. To MoWT and renamed Empire Contees. Allocated in 1946 to USSR, renamed Omsk. Sold in 1947 to Zegluga Polska SA, Poland and renamed Opole. To Polish Government in 1950. Used as a cadet training ship, renamed Zetempowiec. To Polish Navy in 1957 and renamed Gryf. Used as a training ship, subsequently became an unnamed accommodation ship at a Polish naval base.

=== Empire Content ===
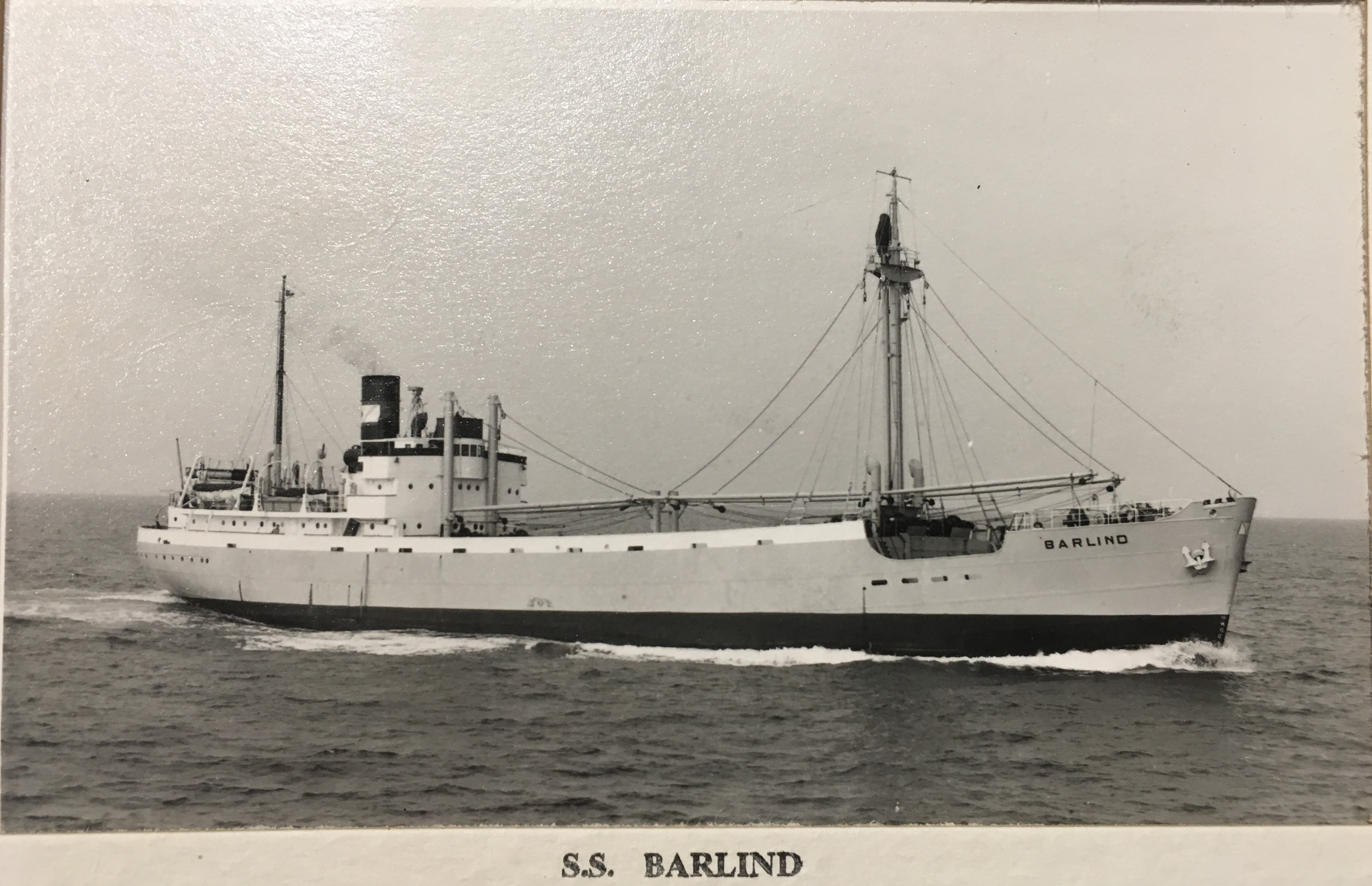
Barlind

Empire Content was a 1,453 GRT cargo ship which was built by Deutsche Schiff- und Maschinenbau AG, Bremen. Launched in 1938 as Süderau for Bugsier Line, Hamburg. Seized in May 1945 at Bremerhaven. To MoWT and renamed Empire Content. Allocated in 1946 to Norway. To the Norwegian Government and renamed Svartnes. Sold in 1947 to F Olsen & Co, Norway and renamed Barlind. Sold in 1971 to L N Pothas, Greece, and renamed Ikaria. Scrapped in March 1972 at Aspropyrgos, Greece.

=== Empire Contest ===
Empire Contest was a 1,175 GRT cargo ship which was built by Neptun AG, Rostock. Launched in 1924 as Alk for Argo Line, Bremen. Seized in May 1945 at Brunsbüttel. To MoWT and renamed Empire Contest. Allocated in 1946 to USSR and renamed Vereshyogin.

=== Empire Continent ===
Empire Continent was an 842 GRT coaster which was built by Kjøbenhavns Flydedok & Skibsverft, Copenhagen. Launched in 1908 as Laura. Sold in 1935 to Wendenhof Reederei GmbH, Wismar and renamed Sylt. Requisitioned in 1940 by the Kriegsmarine. Seized in May 1945 at Trondheim, Norway. to MoWT and renamed Empire Continent. Sold in 1947 to A G Tsavliris Ltd, London, and renamed Master Nicolas. Sold in 1952 to N T Papadatos, Greece, and renamed Soussana II. Sold in 1955 to L G Matsas, Greece, and renamed Georgios Matsas. Struck rocks on 18 April 1955 at Muros, Spain, and subsequently sank. Refloated on 17 June 1955, declared a constructive total loss but sold and repaired. To Dabaco & Co, Panama and renamed Sur. Scrapped in August 1965 in Santander, Spain.

=== Empire Contour ===
Empire Contour was a 965 GRT coaster which was built by F Schichau GmbH, Elbing. Launched in 1922 as Tertia. Sold in 1925 to Horn Dampschiff Rhederei Akt, Germany and renamed Hornland. Sold in 1926 to Norddeutscher Lloyd, Germany, and renamed Taube. Sold in 1933 to Argo Line, Bremen. Seized in May 1945 at Flensburg. To MoWT and renamed Empire Contour. Allocated in 1946 to Belgium. To Vloeberghs Reederij, Belgium and renamed Jean Marie. Sank on 12 December 1951 in Baltic Sea (58°40′N 20°30′E) after cargo shifted while on a voyage from Kotka to Ostend.

=== Empire Contract ===
Empire Contract was a 965 GRT coaster which was built by Norderwerft AG, Hamburg. Launched in 1925 as Wiedau for Bugsier Line, Hamburg. Seized in May 1945 at Hamburg. To MoWT and renamed Empire Contract. Allocated in 1945 to Greece. To Greek Government and renamed Herakleion. Sold in 1948 to Lakoniki Steamship Navigation Co and renamed Laconia. Operated under the management of I Tsengas & Co, Greece. Sold in 1954 to Hellenic Levant Line, Greece. Sold in 1964 to J Alexatos, Greece. Sold in 1965 to Sinai Manganese Co, Egypt and renamed Manganese.

=== Empire Control ===
Empire Control was a 5,703 GRT tanker which was built by Reiherstieg Schiffswerfte & Maschinenfabrik, Hamburg. Launched in 1913 as Wotan for the Deutsche-Amerikan Petroleum Co. One of the first diesel-powered oceangoing ships. Allocated to the US after the First World War, to Standard Oil Co. Sailed from London on 22 December 1920 bound for New York but suffered engine trouble on the voyage. Laid up at Baltimore. Sold in 1927 to Compagnia Italiana Trasporto Olii Minerali, Genoa. Re-engined with a triple-expansion steam engine and renamed Gianna M, now 5,612 GRT. Captured in May 1941 by HMS Hilary when north of the Canary Islands. Escorted to Belfast. To MoWT and renamed Empire Control. Laid up in 1945 at Falmouth, intended for conversion to a factory ship. Sold in 1948 to Shell Company of Gibraltar Ltd and renamed Kleinella. Used as a storage hulk at Gibraltar. Scrapped in December 1953 at Dunston on Tyne, Northumberland.

=== Empire Contyne ===
Empire Contyne was a 1,935 GRT cargo ship which was built by Flensburger Schiff-Gesellschaft. Launched in 1945 as Rodenbeck for Knohr & Burchard, Germany. Seized in May 1945 at Flensburg. To MoWT and renamed Empire Contyne. Allocated in 1946 to US, to United States Maritime Commission (USMC). To Smith-Johnson Steamship Corporation, New York in 1948. Sold in 1952 to Compagnia Maritime Estrella, Panama, and renamed Aenos. Operated under the management of P D Marchessini & Co. Sold in 1963 to Southern Star Shipping Co Ltd, Liberia, and renamed Marlin. Cargo shifted on 18 October 1965 when ship was 130 nautical miles (240 km) off Cape Fear, North Carolina. Sank at 34°38′N 75°32′W. Was on a voyage from Tampa, Florida to Port Williams, Nova Scotia.

=== Empire Convention ===
Empire Convention was a 1,714 GRT cargo ship which was built by Helsingborgs Varfs Aktiebolaget, Helsingborg, Sweden. Launched in 1943 as Heidberg for August Bolten Wm Müllers Nachtfolger, Hamburg. Seized in May 1945 at Stettin. to MoWT and renamed Empire Convention. Allocated in 1946 to USSR and renamed Ernst Thaelmann.

=== Empire Conveyor ===
Empire Conveyor was a 5,911 GRT cargo ship which was built by Richardson, Duck & Co Ltd, Stockton on Tees. Launched in 1917 as Farnworth. Sold in 1926 to Compagnie Générale Transatlantique (CGT), France and renamed Illinois. Sold in 1934 to Kulukundis Shipping Co, Greece and renamed Mount Pentelikon. Sold in 1939 to Orion Schiffsahrt, Hamburg and renamed Gloria. Sailed from Buenos Aires on 8 September 1939 in attempt to return to Germany but captured on 21 October 1939 by HMS Sheffield south east of Iceland. Escorted to Leith. To MoWT and renamed Empire Conveyor. Torpedoed and sunk on 20 June 1940 by U-122 50 nautical miles (93 km) south west of Barra Head, Hebrides (56°16′N 8°10′W).

=== Empire Convoy ===
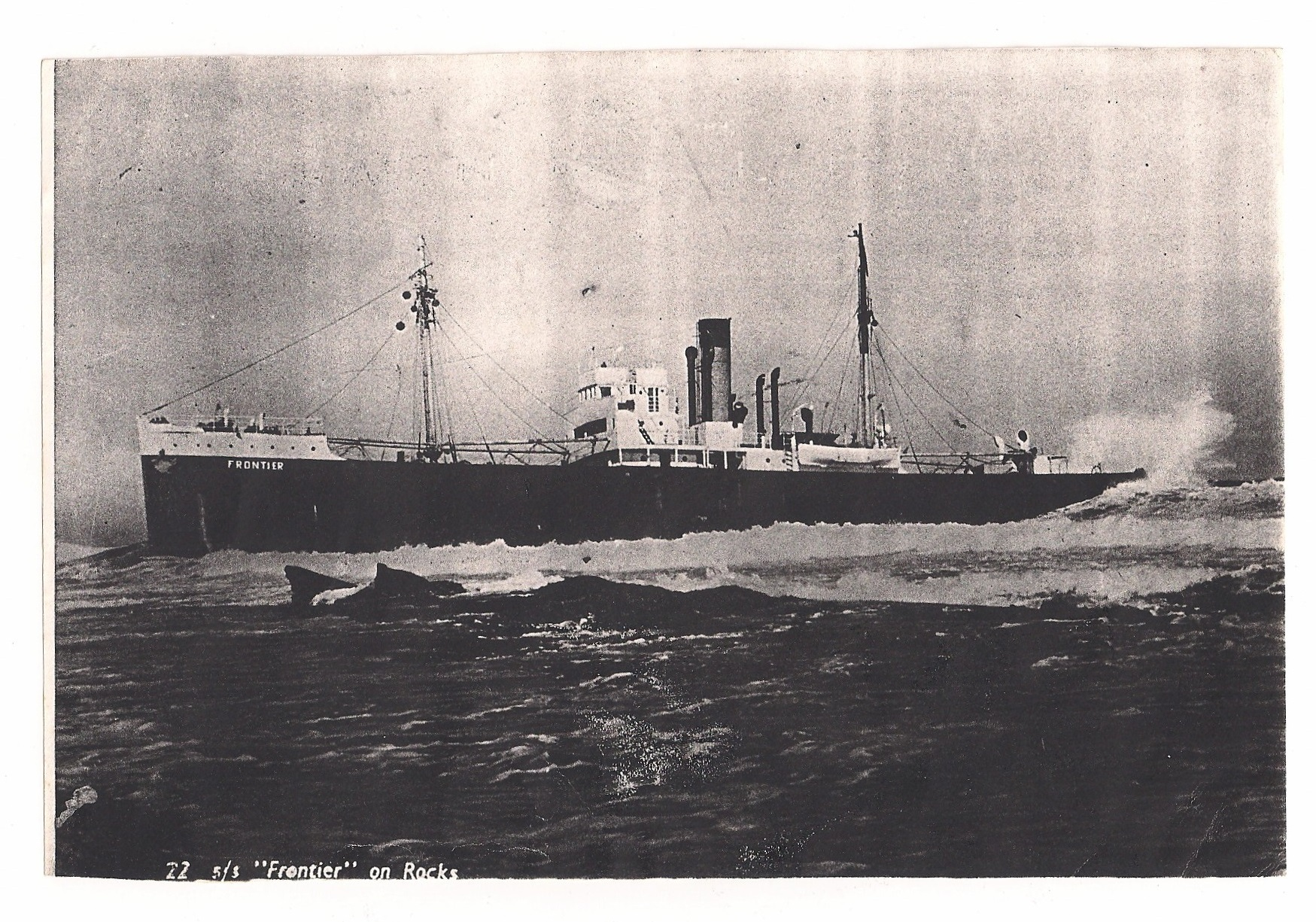
The stranding of Frontier.

Empire Convoy was a 1,424 GRT cargo ship which was built by Lindenau & Co, Memel. Launched in 1922 as Cattaro. Sold in 1930 to Bugsier Line, Hamburg and renamed Finkenau. Damaged in May 1940 by a mine in the Baltic. Renamed Levensau in 1945. Seized in May 1945 at Brunsbüttel. To MoWT and renamed Empire Convoy. Allocated in 1946 to the Netherlands. To Dutch Government and renamed Grebberg. Sold in 1947 to Hudig & Veder, Netherlands and renamed Echo. Sold in 1952 to African Coasters (Pty) Ltd, Durban and renamed Frontier. Ran aground on 27 September 1957 at the mouth of the Ncera River, 23 nautical miles (43 km) south of East London while on a voyage from Durban to Port Elizabeth. The ship broke up on 29 September and declared a total loss.

=== Empire Conway ===
Empire Conway was a 1,000 GRT cargo ship which was built by Goedhardt Gebr. AG, Hamburg. Launched in 1925 as Riga. Sold in 1934 to Mathies Reederei, Germany and renamed Königsberg. Renamed Stettin in 1939. Seized in May 1945 at Flensburg. to MoWT and renamed Empire Conway Allocated in 1946 to USSR, renamed Anakriya. Scrapped in 1978 in USSR.

=== Empire Conwear ===
Empire Conwear was a 2,487 GRT cargo ship which was built by Lübecker Flenderwerke AG, Lübeck. Launched in 1936 as Nordcoke for F Krupp & Co, Essen. Requisitioned in 1940 by the Kriegsmarine, renamed Nordlicht. Seized in May 1945 at Hamburg. To MoWT and renamed Empire Conwear. Allocated in 1946 to USSR, renamed Armavir. Sold in 1947 to Żegluga Polska Line, Poland and renamed Kolno. Scrapped in June 1971 in Poland.

=== Empire Cony ===
Empire Cony was a 997 GRT coaster which was built by Stettiner Oderwerke AG, Stettin. Launched in 1921 as Wilhelm Russ for Ernst Russ, Hamburg. Seized in May 1945 at Eckernförde. To MoWT and renamed Empire Cony. Sold in 1947 to Storeship Transport Co, London and renamed Elsie Beth. Sold in 1950 to Ernst Russ, Hamburg, and renamed Wilhelm Russ. Scrapped in October 1958 in Hamburg.

=== Empire Conyngham ===
Empire Conyngham was a 1,408 GRT cargo ship which was built by Neptun AG, Rostock. Launched in 1899 as Marie. Sold in 1923 to Ozean Dampschiff AG, Germany and renamed Norburg. Sold in 1925 to Latvian Government and renamed Gauja. Captured on 8 June 1941 in the Baltic by the Kriegsmarine. To Otto Wiggers, Rostock and renamed Freidrich. Seized in May 1945, to MoWT and renamed Empire Conyngham. Scuttled on 20 June 1949 with a cargo of obsolete bombs at 47°52′N 8°51′W.

=== Empire Copperfield ===
Empire Copperfield was a 5,998 GRT cargo ship which was built by William Pickersgill & Sons Ltd, Sunderland. Launched on 16 July 1943 and completed in September 1943. Sold in 1946 to I Williams & Co Ltd, Cardiff and renamed Graigwen. Sold in 1958 to Great Eastern Shipping Company, Bombay, and renamed Jag Devi. Arrived on 19 July 1963 at Bombay for scrapping.

=== Empire Coppice ===
Empire Coppice was an 814 GRT coaster which was built by A & J Inglis Ltd, Glasgow. Launched on 27 March 1943 and completed in June 1943. Sold in 1948 to Kuwait Oil Co Ltd and renamed Amin. Operated under the management of Anglo-Iranian Oil Co Ltd. To Shell Mex & BP Ltd in 1953 and renamed Shell Fitter. Sold in 1964 to D I Philippopoulos, Greece, and renamed Aliki. Sold in 1966 to Naftiki Adrotiki, Greece, then sold in 1968 to Marine Water Supply Co Ltd, Greece. Scrapped in September 1969 at Perama, Greece.

=== Empire Coral ===
Empire Coral was an 8,602 GRT tanker which was built by Sir J Laing & Sons Ltd, Sunderland. Launched on 11 February 1941 and completed in April 1941. Sold in 1946 to British Empire Steam Navigation Co Ltd and renamed Derwent River. Operated under the management of Furness, Withy & Co Ltd. sold in 1947 to Northern Petroleum Tankship Co Ltd and renamed Derwentfield. Operated under the management of Hunting & Son Ltd. On 1 September 1952 extensively damaged by explosions and subsequent fire during tank cleaning at Balik Papan, Borneo. Ship abandoned on 16 September 1952 as a constructive total loss. Refloated in 1953 and sold to Compagnia Globo de Navigazione SA, Panama. Arrived on 15 May 1953 at Osaka, Japan for repairs. Uneconomic to repair and beached in Kitzu River, Osaka. Scrapping commenced on 21 August 1953.

=== Empire Cormorant ===
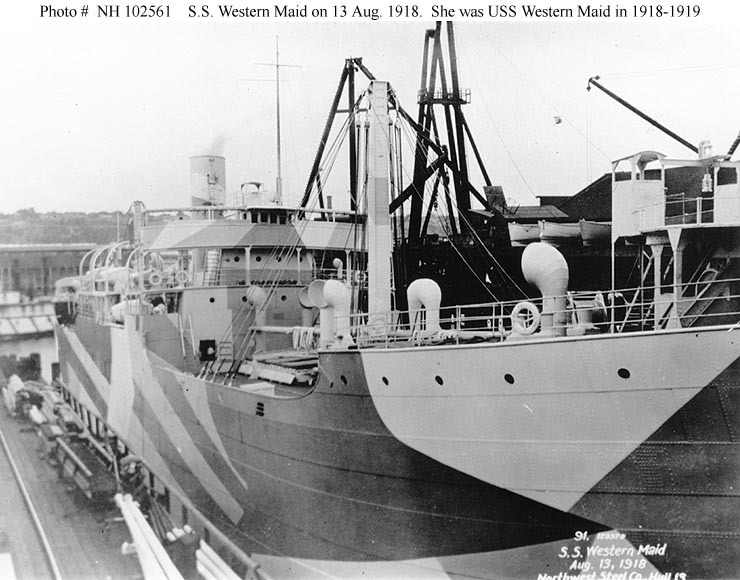
Western Maid

Empire Cormorant was a 5,760 GRT cargo ship which was built by Northwest Steel Co, Portland, Oregon. Ordered by the CGT as Aisne but launched in August 1918 as Western Maid for United States Shipping Board (USSB). To USMC in 1937, then MoWT in 1941 and renamed Empire Cormorant. Scuttled on 1 October 1945 in the Bay of Biscay with a load of chemical ammunition.

=== Empire Corporal ===
Empire Corporal was a 6,972 GRT tanker which was built by Palmers Ltd, Jarrow. Launched in 1922 as British Corporal for British Tanker Co Ltd. Damaged on 4 July 1940 by German E-boats in the English Channel. Anchored at Portland and later towed to Southampton. To MoWT, repaired and renamed Empire Corporal. Torpedoed and sunk on 14 August 1942 by U-598 off Cuba (21°45′N 76°10′W) while on a voyage from Curaçao to Key West, Florida.

=== Empire Cougar ===
Empire Cougar was a 5,758 GRT cargo ship which was built by Northwest Steel, Portland. Completed in October 1919 as West Saginaw for USSB. To MoWT in 1941 and renamed Empire Cougar. Sold in 1946 to Aurora Shipping Co and renamed Aurora. Operated under the management of Goulandris Bros. Sold in 1948 to Compagnia Maritima del Este, Panama, and renamed Cougar. Sold in 1951 to Trama Trasporti Marittimi SpA, Italy and renamed Favola. Sold in 1959 to Compagnia Armatoriale Italiana. Scrapped in March 1960 in Spezia.

=== Empire Courage ===
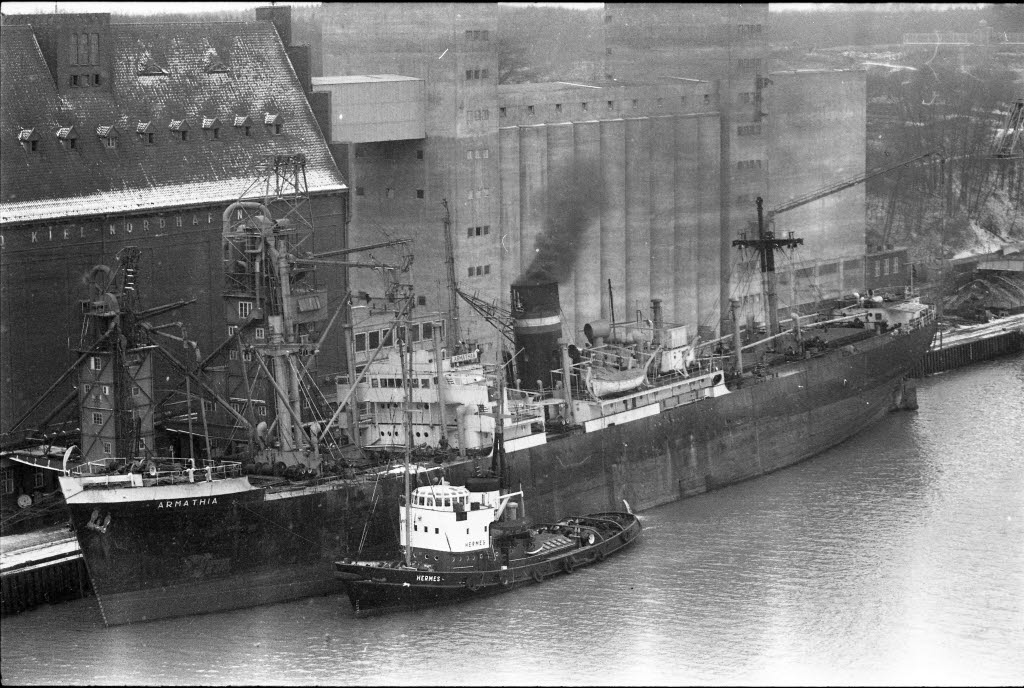
Armathia

Empire Courage was a 7,089 GRT cargo ship which was built by Barclay, Curle & Co, Glasgow. Launched on 21 December 1942 and completed in May 1943. To Dutch Government in 1943 and renamed Philips Wouwerman. Sold in 1947 to NV Stoomscheep Maatschappij Nederland and renamed Ceram. Sold in 1953 to Amsterdam NV Rederei and renamed Amsteltoren, then Amstelbrug. Sold in 1959 to Compagnia Navigazione Alameda SA, Greece and renamed Armathia. Sold in 1965 to Velamar Compagnia Navigazione, Greece and renamed Calliman. Arrived in April 1968 at Kaohsiung for scrapping.

=== Empire Cowdray ===
Empire Cowdray was a 7,072 GRT cargo ship which was built by Shipbuilding Corporation Ltd, Sunderland. Launched on 19 August 1944 and completed in October 1944. Sold in 1948 to Goulandris Bros, London, and renamed Granhill. Sold in 1951 to Turnbull, Scott & Co Ltd and renamed Baxtergate. Arrived on 1 December 1960 at Barrow in Furness for scrapping.

=== Empire Cowper ===
Empire Cowper was a 7,161 GRT cargo ship which was built by William Doxford & Sons Ltd, Sunderland. Launched on 23 September 1941 and completed in December 1941. Bombed and sunk by Junkers Ju 88 aircraft on 11 April 1942 in the Barents Sea (71°01′N 36°00′E) while a member of Convoy QP 10.

=== Empire Crag ===
Empire Crag was a 332 GRT coaster which was built by J Pollock & Sons Ltd, Faversham, Kent. Launched on 15 March 1941 and completed in June 1941. Sold in 1946 to Springwell Shipping Co Ltd, London, and renamed Springcrag. Sold in 1954 to Walford Lines Ltd, London and renamed Walcrag. Sold in 1962 to J Prior (Transport) Ltd, London and renamed Colne Trader. Sold in 1976 to C G Yell, London and renamed Spithead Trader.

=== Empire Cranmer ===
Empire Cranmer was a 7,460 GRT cargo ship which was built by J L Thompson & Sons Ltd, Sunderland. Launched on 8 July 1941 and completed in October 1941. To Greek Government in 1942 and renamed Thraki. Sold in 1947 to Livanos Maritime Co Ltd, Greece and renamed Arietta. Ran aground on 17 March 1961 near Novorossiysk, USSR. Refloated on 1 April 1961 and towed to Novorossiysk but declared a total loss.

=== Empire Creek ===
Empire Creek was a 332 GRT coaster which was built by J Pollock & Sons Ltd, Faversham. Launched on 15 January 1941 and completed in April 1941. Disabled on 13 June 1941 by bombing off Peterhead, Aberdeenshire. Towed to Aberdeen and repaired. Sold in 1946 to Springwell Shipping Co Ltd and renamed Springcreek. Sold in 1948 to E J & W Goldsmith Ltd, London, and renamed Goldcreek. Sold in 1951 to J Carter (Poole) Ltd, Poole and renamed Milborne. Sold in 1964 to S Skordalakis, Greece, and renamed Georgios. Sold in 1978 to Zoegeorge SA, Panama, and renamed Ulysses. Ran aground on 20 December 1979 near Naples and wrecked.

=== Empire Crest ===
Empire Crest was a 3,750 GRT tanker which was built by Sir J Laing & Sons Ltd, Sunderland. Launched on 7 July 1944 and completed in September 1944. Sold in 1946 to Anglo-Saxon Petroleum Co Ltd and renamed Bursa. Sold in 1955 to Shell Tankers Ltd, operated under the management of Shell Petroleum Co Ltd. Scrapped in July 1961 at Sungei Perampuan, Singapore.

=== Empire Cricketer ===
Empire Cricketer was a 200 GRT coaster which was built by I Pimblott & Sons Ltd, Northwich. Launched on 18 September 1943 and completed in February 1944. Sold in 1946 to M/S Straum, Norway, and renamed Havstraum. Operated under the management of A Utkilen, Norway. Sold in 1967 to A A Rasmussen, Norway, and renamed Anne Berith. Sold in 1970 to Per Hagen, Norway, and renamed Akstank. A new diesel engine was fitted in 1971. Sold in 1977 to Bulk Product Shipping Trading (Pte) Ltd, Singapore, and renamed High Heat.

=== Empire Crocus ===
Empire Crocus was a 341 GRT coaster which was built by Noord Nederland Scheepsmakkerij, Groningen. Launched in 1936 as Dr Colijn for M Oosterhuis, Delfzijl. Requisitioned in 1940 by MoWT and renamed Empire Crocus. Sold in 1947 to HP Marshall & Co, Middlesbrough and renamed Stainton. Sold in 1951 to Mountwood Shipping Co, Liverpool, and renamed Benwood. Sold in 1955 to Rederi A/B Selen, Finland, and renamed Monica. Sold in 1957 to N O Olausson, Sweden, and renamed Mona. Sold in 1963 to J L Hansen, Denmark, and renamed Scantic. Foundered on 7 December 1964 in St Georges Channel 51°10′N 7°15′W.

=== Empire Cromer ===
Empire Cromer was a 7,058 GRT cargo ship which was built by Short Brothers Ltd, Sunderland. Launched on 21 December 1943 and completed in April 1944. Sold in 1946 to Donaldson Line, Glasgow and renamed Corrientes. Sold in 1954 to Williamson & Co Ltd, Hong Kong, and renamed Inchmay. Sold in 1966 to the National Shipping Corporation of Pakistan and renamed Kaukhali. Arrived on 2 April 1968 at Karachi for scrapping.

=== Empire Cromwell ===
Empire Cromwell was a 5,970 GRT cargo ship which was built by William Pickersgill & Sons Ltd, Sunderland. Launched on 8 July 1941 and completed in September 1941. Torpedoed and sunk on 28 November 1942 by U-508 southeast of Trinidad (09°00′N 58°30′W).

=== Empire Cross ===
Empire Cross was a 3,738 GRT oil tanker that was built by Sir J Laing & Sons Ltd, Sunderland. Launched on 28 June 1945 and completed that November. Sold in 1946 to Anglo-Saxon Petroleum Co Ltd. Intended to be renamed Balea but on 2 August 1946 exploded and caught fire while discharging aviation fuel in Haifa Roads. HMS Venus and HMS Virago assisted in the rescue. Refloated and scrapped in 1952.

Admiralty discounted a theory that the explosion was caused by a depth charge dropped by a British destroyer to prevent Haganah divers from fixing limpet mines to ships. Captain John Banks, in charge of Empire Cross at the time, was on her bridge and saw the activity on the two naval ships indicating personnel were aware of frogmen in the water around them, which was probably Haganah trying to attach limpet mines, and he noted the sound of depth charges being dropped into the harbour around the ships. Aviation fuel is very volatile, and its transfer ashore from a tanker is very hazardous. At the inquest, the page from the day's activities was missing from the logbook of the suspect naval ship, Virago. 25 of the crew were lost when the ship exploded into flames. Those whose bodies were found were buried in Haifa. Captain Banks signalled to abandon ship when he saw the line go, and dived overboard, swimming under the flames until he lost consciousness but was rescued by Haganah members.

=== Empire Crossbill ===
Empire Crossbill was a 5,463 GRT cargo ship which was built by the Los Angeles Shipbuilding & Drydock Corporation, San Pedro, California. Launched in 1919 as West Amargosa for USSB. To MoWT in 1940 and renamed Empire Crossbill in 1941. Torpedoed and sunk on 11 September 1941 by U-82 at 63°14′N 37°12′W while a member of Convoy SC 42.

=== Empire Crossbow ===
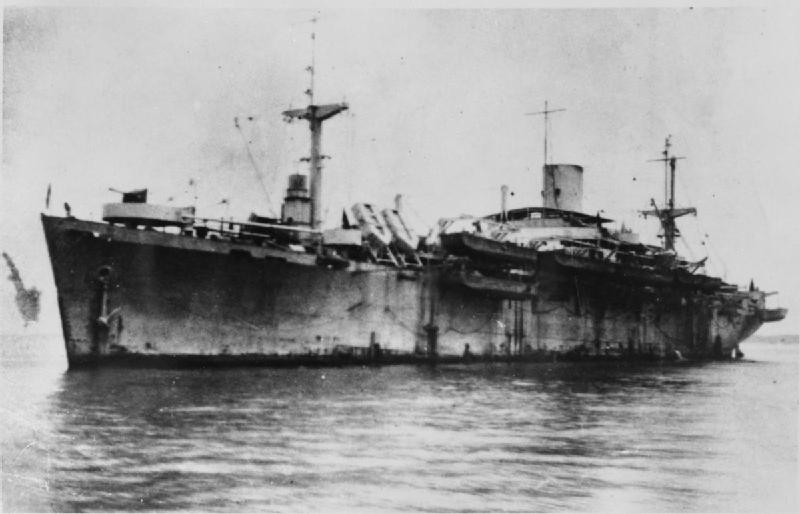
HMS Sanfoin

Empire Crossbow was a 7,177 GRT cargo ship which was built by Consolidated Steel Corporation, Wilmington, Los Angeles. Laid down as Cape Washington and completed in January 1944 as Empire Crossbow for MoWT. Requisitioned later that year by the Royal Navy as HMS Sanfoin. To USMC in 1947 and renamed Cape Washington. Scrapped in December 1964 at Portsmouth, Virginia.

=== Empire Crouch ===
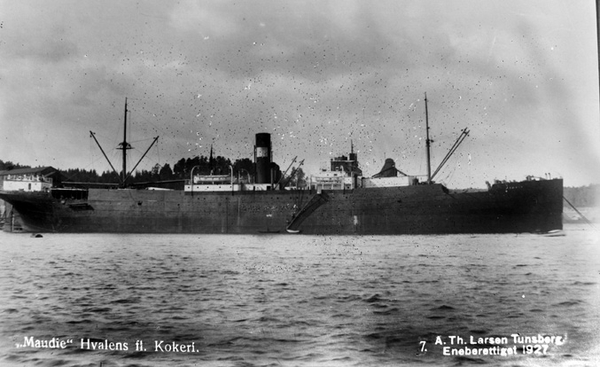
Maudie

Empire Crouch was a 4,661 GRT cargo ship which was built by Lithgows Ltd, Port Glasgow. Laid down in 1920 as tanker War Peshwa but completed as whale oil refinery Maudie. Sold in 1937 to Rederi AB Atlanta-Laivanvarustaja OY Atlanta, Finland and renamed Angra. Sold in 1942 to Finland America Line. Seized in 1943 by Germany at Danzig. Damaged on 16 April 1945 by bombing at Hela, Poland. Seized in May 1945 at Copenhagen. To MoWT and renamed Empire Crouch. Chartered in 1946 to Finnish Government and renamed Mercator. Returned in 1948 to Finland America Line. Sold in 1951 to Finsk Line, Finland. Sold in 1956 to J Nurminen, Finland, and renamed Ruth Nurminen. Scrapped in May 1959 at Yokohama, Japan.

=== Empire Crown ===
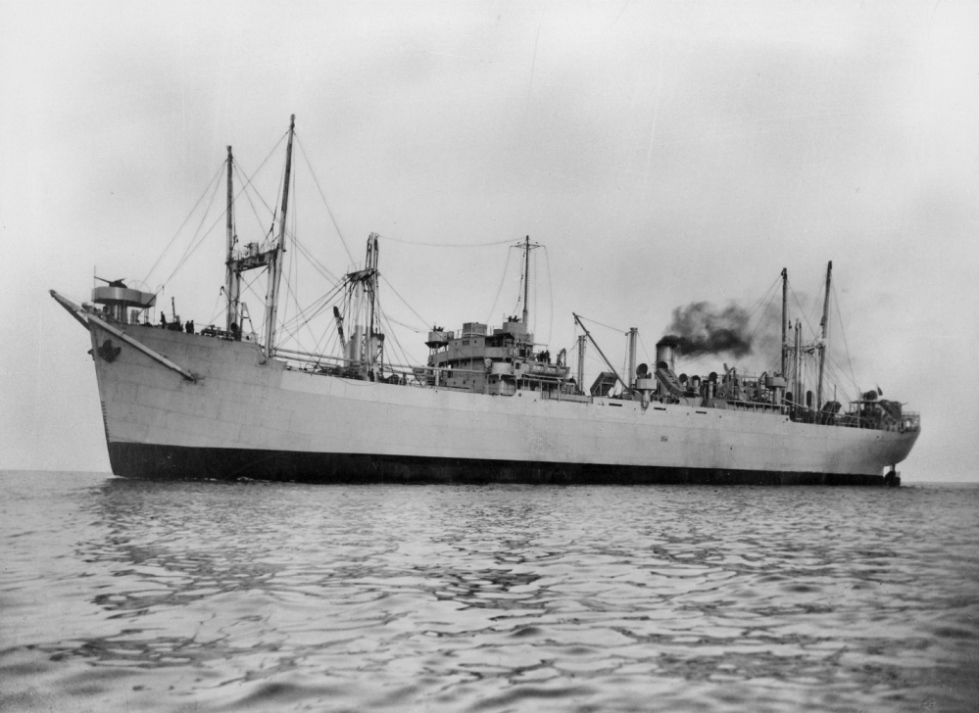
Empire Crown

Empire Crown was a 7,067 GRT cargo ship which was built by John Readhead & Sons Ltd, Sunderland. Launched on 16 October 1943 and completed in January 1944. To French Government in 1945 and renamed Capitaine G Lacoley. Sold in 1961 to Mparmpapetros Shipping Co Sa and renamed Mparmpa Petros. Operated under the management of Pateras Shipbrokers Ltd, London. Ran aground on 22 May 1963 at Porto de Pedras, Brazil, a total loss.

=== Empire Crusader ===
Empire Crusader was a 1,042 GRT cargo ship which was built by Atlas Werke AG, Bremen. Launched in 1925 as Leander for Neptun Line, Bremen. Captured on 9 November 1939 by the British destroyer Isis off Vigo, Spain. Escorted to Falmouth, arriving on 13 November. To MoWT and renamed Empire Crusader. Attacked on 8 August 1940 by German aircraft 15 nautical miles (28 km) west of St Catherine's Point, Isle of Wight. Ship was abandoned and later capsized and sank.

=== Empire Crusoe ===
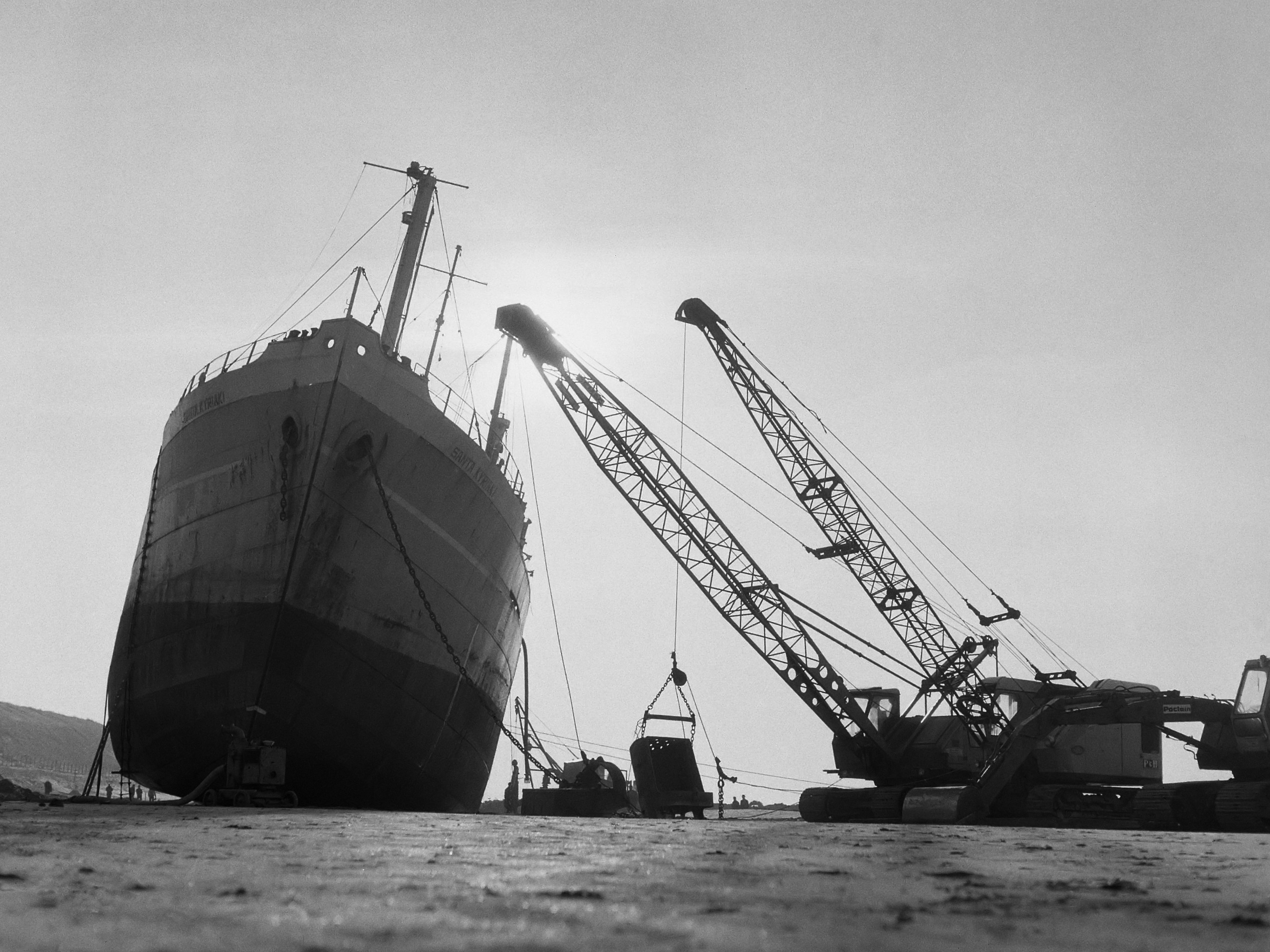
Santa Kyriaki stranded.

Empire Crusoe was a 2,958 GRT cargo ship which was built by Ailsa Shipbuilding Co, Troon, Ayrshire. Launched on 11 April 1945 and completed in October 1945. Sold in 1946 to Currie Line Ltd, Leith and renamed Greenland. Sold in 1955 to Constants Ltd, Cardiff and renamed Heminge. Sold in 1956 to Socoa Shipping Co Ltd and renamed Maria Luisa. Operated under the management of R de la Sota, France. Sold in 1963 to Nereide Compagnia Maritime SA, Panama, and renamed Santa Kyriaki. Ran aground on 24 November 1965 at IJmuiden, Netherlands. Refloated on 8 March 1966 and towed to IJmuiden but declared a constructive total loss. Arrived on 17 July 1966 at Avilés, Spain under tow for scrapping.

=== Empire Cupid ===
Empire Cupid was a 250 GRT tug which was built by Scott & Sons Ltd, Bowling, Dunbartonshire. Launched on 2 June 1942 and completed in July 1947. To the Admiralty in 1947 and renamed Integrity. Arrived on 21 December 1965 at Inverkeithing, Fife for scrapping.

=== Empire Curlew (I) ===
Empire Curlew was a 7,101 GRT Type C2-S cargo ship which was built by Bethlehem Steel Co, Sparrows Point, Maryland. Completed 16 April 1941 as Robin Doncaster for U.S. Maritime Commission (USMC) delivered to U.S. War Shipping Administration. To MoWT 16 April 1941 under Lend Lease agreement and renamed Empire Curlew. To USMC 17 April 1942, documented under U.S. registry and renamed Robin Doncaster 16 May 1942. Conversion to a transport ship by Sullivan Drydock and Repair Corporation, New York was completed in January 1944, operated by War Shipping Administration. To USMC for reconversion on 4 April 1946. Purchased by Seas Shipping Company Inc 10 February 1947. Sold to Flying Gull Inc in June 1957 and renamed Flying Gull. Sold to American Export Lines Inc on 29 September 1962 with corporate owner changed to American Export Isbranden Lines, Inc. on 8 June 1963. Sold Ferrostar Enterprises, Inc. 21 May 1968 then to Eckhardt & Co. for scrapping in Spain. Scrapped in June 1968 in Bilbao, Spain.

=== Empire Curlew (II) ===
Empire Curlew was a 4,820 GRT Landing Ship, Tank (LST) which was built by Harland & Wolff Ltd, Glasgow. Launched in November 1945 as LST 3042 and later served as HMS Hunter. Requisitioned in 1956 during the Suez Crisis. Renamed Empire Curlew and placed under the management of the Atlantic Steam Navigation Company Ltd. Management transferred in 1961 to the British India Steam Navigation Co Ltd. Arrived on 20 August 1962 at Spezia for scrapping.

=== Empire Curzon ===
Empire Curzon was a 7,067 GRT cargo ship which was built by John Readhead & Son Ltd, South Shields. Launched on 24 December 1943 and completed in February 1944. Ran aground on 2 September 1944 on Normandy coast in bad weather, driven onto the wreck of SS Iddesleigh. Towed to Southampton on 29 September where it was found that her bottom was extensively damaged. Towed to Falmouth on 27 November 1944 and laid up. Sold for scrap in November 1945, arrived on 14 December 1945 at Briton Ferry, West Glamorgan for scrapping.

=== Empire Cutlass ===
Empire Cutlass was a 7,177 GRT Type C1-S-AY1 infantry landing ship which was built by Consolidated Steel Corporation, Wilmington, California. Laid down as Cape Compass and completed in November 1943 as Empire Cutlass for MoWT. Damaged by a mine on 21 November 1944 off the Digne Light, Le Havre, towed to port and repaired. To Royal Navy in January 1945 as HMS Sansovino. Returned in June to MoWT and reverted to Empire Cutlass. To USMC in 1947, proposed sale to China in 1948 postponed due to communist revolution. Laid up in the James River, Virginia. Sold in 1960 to China Merchants Steam Navigation Co Ltd, Taiwan and renamed Hai Ou. Scrapped in 1970 at Kaohsiung.

=== Empire Cymric ===
Empire Cymric was a 4,820 GRT LST which was built by Harland & Wolff Ltd, Belfast. Launched in 1944 as LST 3010. Renamed HMS Attacker in 1947. To MoT in 1954, converted to a ferry and renamed Empire Cymric. Operated under the management of Atlantic Steam Navigation Co Ltd. Arrived on 1 October 1963 at Faslane, Dunbartonshire for scrapping.

=== Empire Cyprus ===
Empire Cyprus was a 7,189 GRT cargo ship which was built by Lithgows Ltd, Port Glasgow. Launched on 18 April 1945 and completed in June 1945. Sold in 1948 to North Shipping Co Ltd and renamed North Britain. Operated under the management of H Roberts & Son, Newcastle upon Tyne. Sold in 1962 to Kinabatagan Shipping Co Ltd and renamed Jesselton Bay. Operated under the management of United China Shipping Co Ltd, Hong Kong. Arrived on 2 April 1968 at Kaohsiung for scrapping.

== See also ==
The above entries give a precis of each ship's history. For a fuller account see the linked articles.

== Sources ==
- Mitchell, W H; Sawyer, L A (1990). The Empire Ships (Second ed.). London, New York, Hamburg, Hong Kong: Lloyd's of London Press Ltd. ISBN 1-85044-275-4.
