= Deike Rickmers =

Deike Rickmers may refer to several ships:

- Deike Rickmers (barque), built 1872, sold 1873 and renamed C R Bischop
- Deike Rickmers (ship), built 1874, ran aground off Harwich in 1884
- SS Deike Rickmers (1896), sold in 1899 and renamed Holsatia
- SS Deike Rickmers (1908), seized in 1917 by China, renamed Hwah Ting
- SS Deike Rickmers (1910), ex Cartagena, purchased 1926, sold to Japan in 1927 and renamed Tami Maru
- SS Deike Rickmers (1912), ex Aker, purchased in 1929, sold in 1938 and renamed Helga Moller
- SS Deike Rickmers (1944), seized in 1945 and renamed Empire Concord and Azov
- MV Deike Rickmers (1996), in service
