= List of Empire ships (C) =

There were 179 Empire ships which had a suffix beginning with C. These are dealt with in two lists:-

- List of Empire ships - Ca to Cl
- List of Empire ships - Co to Cy

For other Empire ships, see:
