= SS Jean Marie (1922) =

German trading vessel

History
- Name: Tertia (1922–25); Hornland (1925–26); Taube (1926–45); Empire Contour (1945–46); Jean Marie (1946–51)
- Owner: Flensburger Dampfschiffahrt Gesellschaft von 1869 (1922–25); Dampfschiffs Rhederei Horn AG (1925–26); Norddeutscher Lloyd (1926–33); Argo Reederei AG (1933–36); Argo Reederei Richard Adler & Co (1936–46); Ministry of War Transport (1945); Ministry of Transport (1945–47); Belgian Government (1947–50); Vloeberghs Reederij (1950–51)
- Operator: Flensburger Dampfschiffahrt Gesellschaft von 1869 (1922–25); Dampfschiffs Rhederei Horn AG (1925–26); Norddeutscher Lloyd (1926–33); Argo Reederei AG (1933–36); Argo Reederei Richard Adler & Co (1936–46); William Coombs & Sons Ltd (1945–47); Vloeberghs Reederij (1947–51)
- Port of registry: (Weimar Republic) Flensburg (1922–25); (Weimar Republic) Lübeck (1925–26); (Weimar Republic) Bremen (1926–33); (Nazi Germany) Bremen (1933–45); (United Kingdom) London (1945–47); (Belgium) Antwerp (1947–51)
- Builder: F Schichau GmbH
- Launched: 1922
- Identification: Code Letters LNRV (1922–33); Code Letters DOCE (1933–45); Code Letters GJBV (1945–46); United Kingdom Official Number 180611 (1945–46)
- Fate: Sank

General characteristics
- Type: Cargo ship
- Tonnage: 964 GRT; 584 NRT; 1,500 DWT
- Length: 229 ft 6 in (69.95 m)
- Beam: 33 ft 6 in (10.21 m)
- Depth: 13 ft 8 in (4.17 m)
- Propulsion: Triple expansion steam engine; Screw propeller
- Complement: 20 (Jean Marie)

Location of the sinking of Jean Marie off Sweden.

Jean Marie was a 964 GRT coaster that was built in 1922 by F Schichau GmbH, Elbing, Germany as Tertia for German owners. A sale in 1925 saw her renamed Hornland. In 1926, a further sale saw her renamed Taube. She was seized by the Allies in May 1945, passed to the Ministry of War Transport (MoWT) and was renamed Empire Contour. In 1946, she was transferred to Belgium and renamed Jean Marie. She was sold into merchant service, serving until 1951 when she sank after her cargo shifted.

== Description ==
The ship was built in 1922 by F Schichau GmbH, Elbing.

The ship was 229 feet 6 inches (69.95 m) long, with a beam of 33 feet 6 inches (10.21 m) and a depth of 13 feet 8 inches (4.17 m). The ship was of 964 GRT, 736 NRT, 1,500 DWT.

The ship was propelled by a triple expansion steam engine, which had cylinders of 15 3/4 inches (40 cm), 27 5/8 inches (70 cm) and 42 9/16 inches (108.1 cm) diameter by 27 5/8 inches (70 cm) stroke. The engine was built by Schichau.

== History ==
Tertia was built for the Flensburger Dampfschiffahrt Gesellschaft von 1869, Flensburg. In 1925, she was sold to the Dampfschiffs Rhederei Horn AG, Lübeck, and was renamed Hornland. In 1925, the company was taken over by Norddeutscher Lloyd, Bremen. Hornland was renamed Taube in 1926. The Code Letters LNRV were allocated.

In 1934, Taube was sold to Argo Line, Bremen. The Code Letters DOCE were allocated. In May 1945, Taube was seized by the Allies at Flensburg. She was passed to the MoWT and renamed Empire Contour. Her port of registry was changed to London. The Code Letters GJBV and United Kingdom Official Number 180611 were allocated. She was placed under the management of William Coombs & Sons Ltd.

On 5 May 1947, Empire Contour was transferred to the Belgian Government and was renamed Jean Marie. She was placed under the management of Vloeberghs Reederij, Antwerp. On 10 May, she made her maiden voyage under the Belgian Flag, departing Antwerp for Copenhagen, Denmark. In December 1950, Jean Marie was sold to Vloeberghs Reederij. On 12 December 1951, her cargo of timber shifted while she was on a voyage from Kotka, Finland to Ostend, Belgium. She sank south of Stockholm, Sweden at 58°40′N 20°30′E. Her crew of 20 were rescued by the Soviet cargo ship Imandra, which was on a voyage from Leningrad to Amsterdam, Netherlands. They were landed at Kiel, West Germany. The Swedish minesweeper HMS Landsort also responded, but arrived after Jean Marie had sunk.
