= SS Pinnau =

Cargo ship built 1922

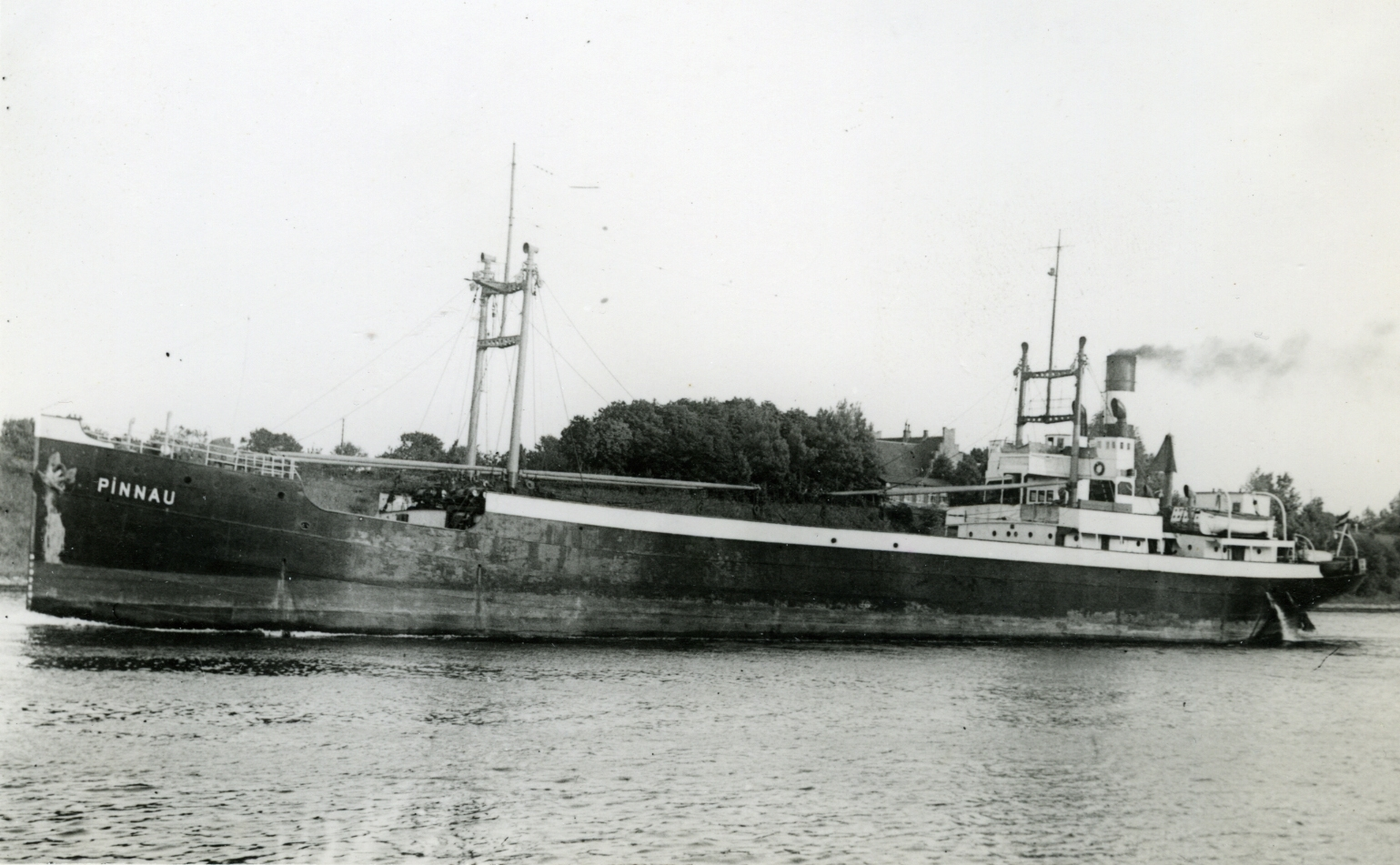
- Pinnau (1943)

History
- Name: Pinnau (1922–45); Empire Constructor (1945–47); Estkon (1947–59)
- Owner: Bugsier Reederei & Bergungs AG (1922–45); Ministry of War Transport (1945); Ministry of Transport (1945–47); J Carlbom & Co (1947–59)
- Operator: Bugsier Reederei & Bergungs AG (1922–45); Frank S Dawson Ltd (1945–47); J Carlbom & Co (1947–59)
- Port of registry: (Weimar Republic) Hamburg (1922–44); (Nazi Germany) Hamburg (1933–45); (United Kingdom) London (1945–47); (United Kingdom) Hull (1947–59)
- Builder: Nobiskrug Werft GmbH
- Yard number: 106
- Launched: April 1922
- Commissioned: 5 August 1922
- Identification: Code Letters RCPJ(1922–34); Code Letters DHTG (1934–45); Code Letters GFZX (1945–59); United Kingdom Official Number 180610 (1945–59)
- Fate: Scrapped

General characteristics
- Type: Cargo ship
- Tonnage: 1,198 GRT (1922–37); 1,200 GRT (1937–45); 1,201 GRT (1945–59); 638 NRT (1922–36); 617 NRT (1937–45); 616 NRT (1945–59)
- Length: 250 ft 0 in (76.20 m)
- Beam: 37 ft 5 in (11.40 m)
- Depth: 12 ft 8 in (3.86 m)
- Installed power: Triple expansion steam engine
- Propulsion: Screw propeller

Pinnau was a 1,198 GRT cargo ship that was built in 1922 by Nobiskrug Werft GmbH, Rendsburg, Germany for German owners. She was seized by the Allies in May 1945, passed to the Ministry of War Transport (MoWT) and was renamed Empire Constructor. In 1947, she was sold into merchant service and renamed Estkon. She served until 1959 when she was scrapped.

== Description ==
The ship was built in 1922 by Nobiskrug Werft GmbH, Rendsburg.

The ship was 250 feet 0 inches (76.20 m) long, with a beam of 37 feet 5 inches (11.40 m) and a depth of 12 feet 8 inches (3.86 m). The ship had a GRT of 1,198 and a NRT of 638.

The ship was propelled by a triple expansion steam engine, which had cylinders of 17 3/4 inches (45 cm), 28 1/2 inches (72 cm) and 45 1/4 inches (115 cm) diameter by 29 1/2 inches (75 cm) stroke. The engine was built by Ottensener Maschinenbau, Altona.

== History ==
Pinnau was built for Bugsier Reederei & Bergungs AG, Hamburg. Her port of registry was Hamburg. The Code Letters RCPJ were allocated. On 8 October 1931, Pinnau was in port at Leningrad, Soviet Union, where there was a dock strike. At 14:30, some 15 or 20 sailors tried to board Pinnau to search the ship. They were repelled by the crew, but not without injuries being sustained. On 16 November 1933, Pinnau was driven ashore in the Koivisto Sound, Soviet Union. She was bound for Amsterdam, Netherlands with a cargo of timber. She was refloated on 20 November. In 1934, her Code Letters were changed to DHTG. In 1937, she was listed as 1,200 GRT, 617 NRT.

In May 1945, Pinnau was seized by the Allies at Lübeck. She was passed to the MoWT and renamed Empire Constructor. Her port of registry was changed to London and she was placed under the management of Frank S Dawson Ltd. The Code Letters GFZX and United Kingdom Official Number 180610 were allocated. She was listed as 1,201 GRT, 616 NRT. In 1947, Empire Constructor was sold to J Carlbom & Co Ltd, Hull and was renamed Estkon. She served until 1959 when she was scrapped at Newport, Monmouthshire.
