= SS Orlanda =

German cargo ship

History
- Name: Orlanda (1938–45); Empire Conington (1945-49); Alabe (1949–58)
- Owner: Rhederei AG von 1896 (1920–27); Hanseatische Dampschiffsahrts Gesellschaft (1927–33); Argo Reederei AG (1933–37); Argo Reederei Richard Adler & Co (1937–45); Ministry of War Transport (1945); Ministry of Transport (1945–49); Société Anonyme Maritime et Commerciale (1949–58)
- Operator: Rhederei AG von 1896 (1920–27); Hanseatische Dampschiffsahrts Gesellschaft (1927–33); Argo Reederei AG (1933–37); Argo Reederei Richard Adler & Co (1937–45); G Gibson & Co Ltd (1945–46); Government of Newfoundland (1946–49); Société Anonyme Maritime et Commerciale (1949–58)
- Port of registry: (Weimar Republic) Hamburg (1920–33); (Nazi Germany) Bremen (1933–45); (United Kingdom) London (1945–46); (Canada) St John's (1946–49); Panama City (1949–58)
- Builder: F Krupp AG
- Launched: 1920
- Identification: Code Letters RBCV (1920–34); Code Letters DHSO (1934–45); Code Letters GMYP (1945–46); United Kingdom Official Number 180676 (1945–46)
- Fate: Scrapped

General characteristics
- Type: Cargo ship
- Tonnage: 1,288 GRT; 628 NRT
- Length: 238 ft 6 in (72.69 m)
- Beam: 37 ft 6 in (11.43 m)
- Depth: 14 ft 8 in (4.47 m)
- Installed power: Triple expansion steam engine
- Propulsion: Screw propeller

Orlanda was a cargo ship that was built in 1920 by F Krupp AG, Emden for German owners. She was seized by the Allies in Hamburg, in May 1945, passed to the Ministry of War Transport (MoWT) and renamed Empire Conington. In 1946, she was allocated to the Newfoundland Government. In 1949, she was sold to Panama and renamed Alabe. She served until 1958, when she was scrapped.

== Description ==
The ship was built in 1920 by F Krupp, AG, Emden.

The ship was 238 feet 6 inches (72.69 m) long, with a beam of 37 feet 6 inches (11.43 m). She had a depth of 14 feet 8 inches (4.47 m). The ship had a GRT of 1,288 and a NRT of 628.

The ship was propelled by a triple expansion steam engine, which had cylinders of 17 3/4 inches (45 cm), 28 3/4 inches (73 cm) and 47 inches (120 cm) diameter by 33 1/2 inches (85 cm) stroke. The engine was built by Krupp.

== History ==
Orlanda was built for Rhederei AG von 1896, Hamburg. In 1927, she was sold to Hanseatische Dampschiffs Gesellschaft, Hamburg. Her port of registry was Hamburg. The Code Letters RBCV were allocated. On 20 November 1932, Orlanda ran aground at Mannskar, Finland whilst on a voyage from Vaasa to Mäntyluoto, Finland. She was refloated without assistance. In 1933, Orlanda was sold to Argo Reederei AG, Bremen. Her Code Letters were changed to DHSO in 1934. Argo Reederei AG became Argo Reederei Richard Adler & Co in 1937. On 19 March 1935, Orlanda was in collision with Ubena in the River Weser, Germany. In May 1945, Orlanda was seized by the Allies at Hamburg. She was passed to the MoWT and renamed Empire Conington. She was placed under the management of G Gibson & Co Ltd. Her port of registry was changed to London. The Code Letters GMYP and United Kingdom Official Number 180676 were allocated.

In 1946, Empire Conington was allocated to the Government of Newfoundland. She was operated by the Railways and Steamships Department. In 1949, Empire Conington was sold to Société Anonyme Maritime et Commerciale, Panama and was renamed Alabe. She served until 1958 when she was scrapped in Sunderland, United Kingdom.
