= SS Wilhelm Russ =

German cargo ship

History
- Name: Wilhelm Russ (1921–45); Empire Cony (1945–47); Elsie Beth (1947–50); Wilhelm Russ (1950–58)
- Owner: Schiffart-und Assekuranz Gesellschaft GmbH (1921–45); Ministry of War Transport (1945); Ministry of Transport (1945–47); Storeship Transport Co (1947–50); Ernst Russ (1950–58)
- Operator: Ernst Russ (1921–45); C Strubin & Co Ltd (1945–47); Storeship Transport Co (1947–50); Ernst Russ (1950–58)
- Port of registry: (Weimar Republic) Hamburg (1921–33); (Nazi Germany) Hamburg (1933–45); (United Kingdom) London (1945–50); (West Germany) Hamburg (1950–58)
- Builder: Stettiner Oderwerke AG
- Launched: 1921
- Out of service: 20 August 1958
- Identification: Code Letters ROBM (1921–33); Code Letters DHZY (1933–45); Code Letters GKVM (1945–50); United Kingdom Official Number 180660 (1945–50)
- Fate: Scrapped

General characteristics
- Type: Cargo ship
- Tonnage: 997 GRT; 575 NRT; 1,535 DWT
- Length: 210 ft 9 in (64.24 m)
- Beam: 33 ft 8 in (10.26 m)
- Depth: 13 ft 5 in (4.09 m)
- Installed power: Triple expansion steam engine
- Propulsion: Screw propeller

Wilhelm Russ was a 997 GRT coaster that was built in 1921 by Stettiner Oderwerke AG, Stettin, Germany. In 1945, she was seized by the Allies at Eckernförde, passed to the Ministry of War Transport (MoWT) and was renamed Empire Cony. In 1947, she was sold into merchant service and renamed Elsie Beth. In 1950, she was sold back to her original managers and renamed Wilhelm Russ. She served until 1958 when she was scrapped.

== Description ==
The ship was built in 1921 by Stettiner Oderwerke AG, Stettin.

The ship was 210 feet 9 inches (64.24 m) long, with a beam of 33 feet 8 inches (10.26 m) and a depth of 13 feet 5 inches (4.09 m). She was assessed at 997 GRT, 575 NRT, and 1,535 DWT.

The ship was propelled by a triple expansion steam engine, which had cylinders of 15 3/4 inches (40 cm) 25 1/4 inches (64 cm) and 41 5/16 inches (104.9 cm) diameter by 31 1/2 inches (80 cm) stroke. The engine was built byStettiner Oderwerke.

== History ==
Wilhlem Russ was built for Schiffart-und Assekuranz Gesellschaft GmbH. Her port of registry was Hamburg and the Code Letters ROBM were allocated. She was operated under the management of Ernst Russ, Hamburg. In 1934, her Code Letters were changed to DHZY.

In May 1945, Wilhelm Russ was captured by the Allies at Eckernförde. She was passed to the MoWT and renamed Empire Cony. The Code Letters GKVM and United Kingdom Official Number 180660 were allocated. She was operated under the management of C Strubin & Co Ltd. Her port of registry was London.

In 1947, Empire Cony was sold to Storeship Transport Co, London and was renamed Elsie Beth. In 1950, she was sold to Ernest Russ, Hamburg and was renamed Wilhelm Russ. She served until 1958, being sold for scrap on 20 August. The ship was scrapped in Hamburg.
