= SS Günther Russ =

998 GRT coaster

History
- Name: Günther Russ (1921–45); Empire Condorrat (1945–47); Kenton (1947–50); Günther Russ (1950–57)
- Owner: Schiffart-und Assekuranz Gesellschaft GmbH (1921–45); Ministry of War Transport (1945); Ministry of Transport (1945–47); Whitehaven Shipping Co (1947–50); Ernst Russ (1950–57)
- Operator: Ernst Russ (1921–45); Ministry of War Transport (1945); Richard R Chester Ltd (1945–47); Whitehaven Shipping Co (1947–50); Ernst Russ (1950–57)
- Port of registry: (Weimar Republic) Hamburg (1921–33); (Nazi Germany) Hamburg (1933–45); United Kingdom (1945–47); (United Kingdom) Whitehaven (1947–50); (West Germany) Hamburg (1950–57)
- Builder: Stettiner Oderwerke AG
- Launched: 1921
- Completed: October 1921
- Identification: Code Letters RBQD (1921–34); Code Letters DHJP (1934–45)
- Fate: Scrapped 1957

General characteristics
- Type: Cargo ship
- Tonnage: 998 GRT; 575 NRT; 1,535 DWT
- Length: 210 ft 8 in (64.21 m)
- Beam: 33 ft 9 in (10.29 m)
- Depth: 13 ft 4 in (4.06 m)
- Installed power: Triple expansion steam engine
- Propulsion: Screw propeller

Günther Russ was a 998 GRT coaster that was built in 1921 by Stettiner Oderwerke AG, Stettin for German owners. She was seized by the Allies in May 1945, passed to the Ministry of War Transport (MoWT) and renamed Empire Condorrat. She was sold into merchant service in 1947 and renamed Kenton. In 1950, she was sold to West Germany and was renamed Günther Russ, serving until 1957 when she was scrapped.

== Description ==
The ship was built in 1921 by Stettiner Oderwerke AG, Stettin.

The ship was 210 feet 8 inches (64.21 m) long, with a beam of 33 feet 9 inches (10.29 m) a depth of 13 feet 4 inches (4.06 m). She had a GRT of 998 and a NRT of 575. She had a DWT of 1,535.

The ship was propelled by a triple expansion steam engine, which had cylinders of 15 3/4 inches (40 cm), 25 1/2 inches (65 cm) and 34 1/2 inches (88 cm) diameter by 29 1/2 inches (75 cm) stroke. The engine was built by Stettiner Oderwerke.

== History ==
Günther Russ was built for Schiffart-und Assekuranz Gesellschaft GmbH. She was placed under the management of Ernst Russ, Hamburg. The Code Letters RBQD were allocated. In 1934, her Code Letters were changed to DHJP. In May 1945, Günther Russ was seized by the Allies. She was passed to the MoWT and renamed Empire Condorrat. She was operated under the management of Richard R Chester Ltd.

In 1947, Empire Condorrat was sold to Whitehaven Shipping Co, Whitehaven and was renamed Kenton. In 1950, she was sold to Ernst Russ, Hamburg and was renamed Günther Russ. She served until 1957 when she was scrapped in Hamburg.
