= SS Söderhamn =

Cargo ship built 1899

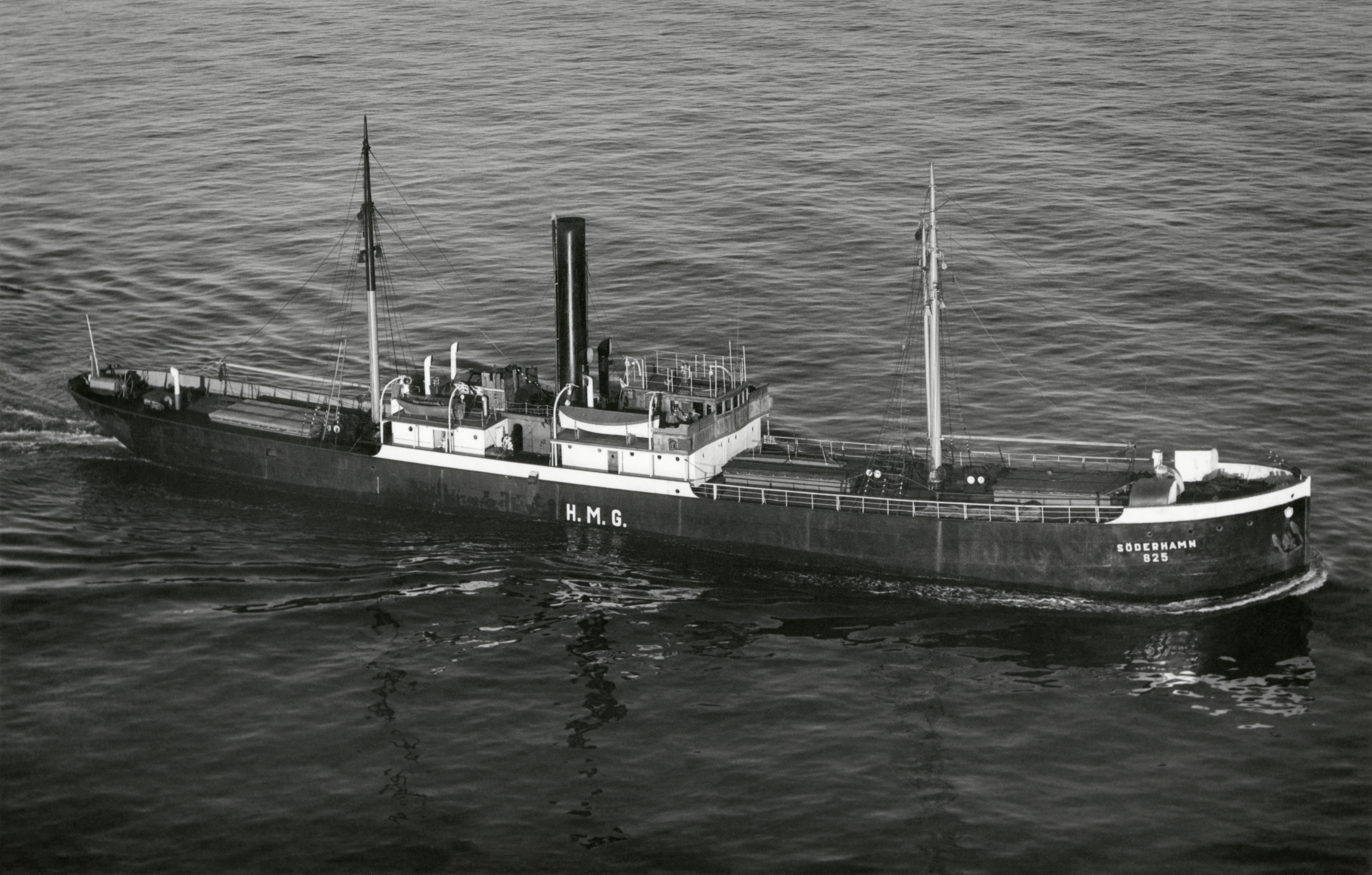
- SS Söderhamn

History
- Name: Söderhamn (1899-1945); Empire Congham (1945-47); Söderhamn (1947-58)
- Owner: H M Gehrckens (1899- ); Nautik GmbH (-1937); H M Gehrkens (1937-45); Ministry of War Transport (1945); Ministry of Transport (1945-47); H M Gehrkens (1947-58)
- Operator: H M Gehrckens (1899- ); Nautik GmbH (-1937); H M Gehrkens (1937-45); William Robertson Ltd (1945-47); H M Gehrkens (1947-58)
- Port of registry: (German Empire) Hamburg(1899-1919); (Weimar Republic) Hamburg (1919-33); (Nazi Germany) Hamburg (1933-45); (United Kingdom) London (1945-47); (Allied-occupied Germany) Hamburg (1947-49); (West Germany) Hamburg (1949-58)
- Builder: Helsingørs Jernskib-og Maskinbyggeri A/S
- Launched: 1899
- Identification: Code Letters RBSP (1930-34); Code Letters DHVW (1934-45); Code Letters GTFX (1945-47); United Kingdom Official Number 180762 (1945-47)
- Fate: Scrapped

General characteristics
- Type: Cargo ship
- Tonnage: 1,499 GRT; 945 NRT
- Length: 240 ft 8 in (73.36 m)
- Beam: 34 ft 1 in (10.39 m)
- Depth: 15 ft 1 in (4.60 m)
- Installed power: Triple expansion steam engine
- Propulsion: Screw propeller

Söderhamn was a 1,499 GRT cargo ship that was built in 1899 by Helsingørs Jernskib-og Maskinbyggeri A/S, Denmark for German owners. She was seized by the Allies at Kiel in May 1945, passed to the Ministry of War Transport (MoWT) and renamed Empire Congham. In 1947, she was returned to her previous owners and renamed Söderhamn. She served until 1958 when she was scrapped in Hamburg, Germany.

== Description ==
The ship was built in 1899 by Helsingørs Jernskib-og Maskinbyggeri A/S, Helsingør, Denmark.

The ship was 240 feet 8 inches (73.36 m) long, with a beam of 34 feet 1 inch (10.39 m) a depth of 15 feet 1 inch (4.60 m). She had a GRT of 1,499 and a NRT of 945.

The ship was propelled by a triple expansion steam engine, which had cylinders of 17 inches (43 cm), 27 1/2 inches (70 cm) and 47 inches (120 cm) diameter by 33 inches (84 cm) stroke. The engine was built by Helsingørs.

== History ==
Söderhamn was built for H.M. Gehrckens, Hamburg. Originally built for Gehrckens' baltic liner-service, from 1900 she was deployed to Walvis Bay, bringing troop supplies to German South-West Africa. During World War I she was trading in the baltic again. In 1915 Söderhamn was torpedoed, but did not sink because of her cargo of timber. At the end of hostilities the ship was delivered to England, but bought back from Gehrckens in 1921. By 1930, Söderhamn was owned by Nautik GmbH but sold to H.M. Gehrckens, Hamburg in 1937.

Her port of registry was Hamburg and she used the Code Letters RBSP. In 1934, her Code Letters were changed to DHVW.

Söderhamn had a collision with a larger cargovessel in November 1944. Her stern was ripped from the railings to the doublebottom, but once again she didn't sink. After repairs in Danzig she took part in Operation Hannibal. Beginning on 30 January 1945 until 8 April 1945 Söderhamn made nine voyages under the command of Captain Kurt Timm, in which she rescued 19,350 refugees from East Prussia and Pomerania via the baltic.

In May 1945, Söderhamn was seized by the Allies at Kiel. She was passed to the MoWT and renamed Empire Congham. Her port of registry was London. She was placed under the management of William Robertson Ltd. The Code Letters GTFX and United Kingdom Official Number 180762 were allocated. In 1947, Empire Congham was returned to the H M Gehrckens, Hamburg and was renamed Söderhamn. She was then the largest merchant ship that Germany possessed. She served until 1958 when she was scrapped at Hamburg.
