= SS Empire Collins =

World War II merchant ship of the United Kingdom

History
- Name: Empire Collins (1942-45); Southern Collins (1945-56); Cassian Sailor (1956-60); Mushtari (1960-64)
- Owner: Ministry of War Transport (1942-45); South Georgia Co Ltd (1945-56); San Felicia Compagnia Navigazione SA (1956-60); Gulf Steamships Ltd (1960-64)
- Operator: Haldin & Phillips Ltd (1942-45); Christian Salvesen & Co Ltd (1945-56); San Felicia Compagnia Navigazione SA (1956-60); Gulf Steamships Ltd (1960-64)
- Port of registry: (United Kingdom) Sunderland (1942-45); (United Kingdom) Leith (1945-56); Panama City (1956-60); (Pakistan) Karachi (1960-64)
- Builder: Sir J Laing & Sons Ltd
- Yard number: 745
- Launched: 29 June 1942
- Completed: December 1942
- Identification: Code Letters BFFM (1942-56); United Kingdom Official Number 169106 (1942-56)
- Fate: Scrapped

General characteristics
- Class & type: Tanker
- Tonnage: 9,795 GRT; 5,784 NRT; 14,766 DWT
- Length: 484 ft 0 in (147.52 m)
- Beam: 68 ft 3 in (20.80 m)
- Depth: 36 ft 1 in (11.00 m)
- Installed power: Triple expansion steam engine
- Propulsion: Screw propeller
- Speed: 10 knots (19 km/h)
- Crew: 63 (Southern Collins)

Empire Collins was a 9,795 GRT tanker which was built in 1942 by Sir J Laing & Sons Ltd, Sunderland for the Ministry of War Transport (MoWT). In 1945 she was sold into merchant service and renamed Southern Collins. She was sold in 1956 to Panama and renamed Cassian Sailor. In 1960 she was sold to Pakistan and renamed Mushtari. She was scrapped in 1964.

== Description ==
The ship was built by Sir J Laing & Sons Ltd, Sunderland as yard number 745. She was launched on 29 June 1942 and completed in December 1942.

The ship was 484 feet 0 inches (147.52 m) long, with a beam of 68 feet 3 inches (20.80 m) and a depth of 36 feet 1 inch (11.00 m). She had a GRT of 9,795 and a NRT of 5,784. Her DWT was 14,766.

The ship was propelled by a triple expansion steam engine, which had cylinders of 27, 44 and 76 inches (69, 112 and 193 cm) diameter by 51 inches (130 cm) stroke. The engine was built by North East Marine Engine Co (1938) Ltd, Newcastle upon Tyne. The engine could propel her at 10 knots (19 km/h) empty, 9.5 knots (17.6 km/h) loaded.

== History ==
Empire Collins was built for the MoWT. She was placed under the management of Haldin & Phillips Ltd. Her port of registry was Sunderland. The Code Letters BFFM and United Kingdom Official Number 169106 were allocated.

Empire Collins was a member of a number of convoys in the Second World War.

ON 161

Convoy ON 161 departed Liverpool on 12 January 1943 and arrived at New York on 31 January. Empire Collins became detached from the convoy on 30 January in poor visibility.

MKS 16

Convoy MKS 16 departed Alexandria, Egypt on 24 June 1943, and arrived at Tripoli, Libya on 29 June. Leaving Tripoli that day, it arrived at Gibraltar on 6 July. The convoy departed Gibraltar on 9 July 1943 and arrived at Liverpool on 22 July. Empire Collins departed from Algiers.

In 1945, Empire Collins was sold to The South Georgia Co Ltd. She was placed under the management of Christian Salvesen & Co Ltd and was renamed Southern Collins. Her port of registry was changed to Leith. In 1952, Southern Collins ran aground at the entrance to Leith Harbour and was holed, losing much of her cargo of whale oil.

In May 1956, Southern Collins was sold to San Felicia Compagnia Navigacion, Panama and was renamed Cassian Sailor. In April 1960, she was sold to the Gulf Steamship Co Ltd, Karachi, West Pakistan and was renamed Mushtari. She was scrapped in 1964 at Karachi.
