= SS Empire Curzon =

World War II merchant ship of the United Kingdom

History
- Name: Empire Curzon
- Owner: Ministry of War Transport
- Operator: R Chapman & Son
- Port of registry: (United Kingdom) South Shields
- Builder: John Readhead & Son Ltd
- Yard number: 538
- Launched: 24 December 1943
- Completed: February 1944
- Maiden voyage: 29 February 1944
- Out of service: 2 September 1944
- Identification: United Kingdom Official Number 169055; Code Letters GFTP
- Fate: Scrapped in 1946

General characteristics
- Class & type: Cargo
- Tonnage: 7,067 GRT; 10,280 DWT
- Length: 431 ft (131 m)
- Beam: 56 ft (17 m)
- Propulsion: Triple expansion steam engine
- Armament: Anti-torpedo nets

Empire Curzon was a 7,067 GRT cargo that was built in 1943 by John Readhead & Sons Ltd, Sunderland, Co Durham for the Ministry of War Transport (MoWT). She had a short career, running aground in September 1944 and then being laid up before being sold for scrap in December 1945.

== Description ==
The ship was built in 1943 by John Readhead & Sons Ltd, Sunderland. She was Yard Number 538.

The ship was 431 feet (131 m) long, with a beam of 56 feet (17 m). She was assessed at 7,067 GRT, Her DWT was 10,280.

The ship was propelled by a triple expansion steam engine.

== History ==
Empire Curzon was launched on 24 December 1943 and completed in February 1944. The United Kingdom Official Number 169055 and Code Letters GFTP were allocated. Her port of registry was South Shields. She was placed under the management of R Chapman & Son Ltd.

Empire Curzon departed from the Tyne on her maiden voyage on 29 February 1944, joining Convoy FN 1281, which had departed from Southend, Essex that day and arrived the following day at Methil, Fife. On 3 March, she joined Convoy EN 353, which arrived at Loch Ewe two days later. Empire Curzon then joined Convoy ON 227, which had departed from Liverpool, Lancashire on 8 March and arrived at New York, United States on 22 March. She was equipped with anti-torpedo nets. She departed from New York on 1 April as a member of Convoy NG 426, which arrived at Guantánamo Bay, Cuba on 8 April. Empire Curzon then sailed to Cape Trujillo and San Pedro de Macorís, Dominican Republic before returning to Guantánamo Bay.

On 28 April, Empire Curzon departed from Guantánamo Bay as a member of Convoy GN 129, which arrived at New York on 5 May. On 10 May, she departed New York as a member of Convoy HX 291, which arrived at Liverpool on 27 May. She was carrying a cargo of sugar.

Empire Curzon departed from Liverpool on 15 July bound for Milford Haven, Pembrokeshire, arriving on 17 July. She departed the next day as a member of Convoy EBC 45, arriving at the Seine Bay, France on 20 July. She departed from the Seine Bay on 3 August, joining convoy FTM 56, which arrived at Southend two days later. She then joined Convoy FN 1440, which departed Southend that day and arrived at Methil on 7 August. She left the convoy at Hull, Yorkshire, arriving on 7 August.

Empire Curzon departed from Hull on 17 August, joining Convoy FS 1547 off Spurn Head. The convoy had departed from Methil that day and arrived at Southend on 19 August. She then joined Convoy ETM 67, which arrived at the Seine Bay on 28 August. On 2 September 1944, Empire Curzon ran aground off Normandy in bad weather. She was driven onto the wreck of the SS Iddesleigh. She was refloated and towed to Southampton, arriving on 25 September. It was found that her bottom was extensively damaged. On 27 October, she was towed to Falmouth, Cornwall, where she was laid up. In November 1945, Empire Curzon was sold for scrap. Empire Curzon departed from Falmouth under tow on 14 December 1945. She arrived at Briton Ferry, West Glamorgan on 16 December for scrapping.
