= SS Malmö (1918) =

1918 German and British coaster

History
- Name: Malmö (1918–45); Empire Contay (1945–47); Reykjanes (1947–53)
- Owner: Bismark Linie GmbH (1918–45); Ministry of War Transport (1945); Ministry of Transport (1945–47); Oddsson & Co (1947–49); Endeavour Shipping Co (1949–53)
- Operator: Bissmark Linie GmbH (1918–45); E T Atkinson & Sons Ltd (1945–47); Oddsson & Co (1947–49); Endeavour Shipping Co (1949–53)
- Port of registry: (German Empire) Hamburg (1918–19); (Weimar Republic) Hamburg (1919–33); (Nazi Germany) Hamburg (1933–45); (United Kingdom) London (1945–47); (United Kingdom) Hull (1947–53)
- Builder: H C Stülcken Sohn
- Launched: 1918
- Identification: Code Letters RWGC (1918–34); Code Letters DHQC (1934–45)
- Fate: Scrapped 1953

General characteristics
- Type: Coaster
- Tonnage: 981 GRT; 468 NRT
- Length: 217 ft 1 in (66.17 m)
- Beam: 32 ft 4 in (9.86 m)
- Depth: 12 ft 7 in (3.84 m)
- Installed power: Triple expansion steam engine
- Propulsion: Screw propeller

Malmö was a 981 GRT coaster that was built in 1918 by HC Stülcken Sohn, Hamburg, Germany for German owners. Although she sank after hitting a mine in 1942, she was salvaged and repaired and then returned to service. She was seized by the Allies in May 1945, passed to the British Ministry of War Transport (MoWT) and was renamed Empire Contay. In 1947, she was sold into merchant service and renamed Reykjanes. She served until 1953 when she was scrapped.

== Description ==
Malmö was built in 1918 by H C Stülcken Sohn at Hamburg. She was 217 feet 1 inch (66.17 m) long, with a beam of 32 feet 4 inches (9.86 m) and a depth of 12 feet 7 inches (3.84 m). The ship measured 981 gross register tons (GRT) and a 468 net register tons (NRT). It was powered by a triple expansion steam engine, which had cylinders of 17 7/16 inches (44.3 cm), 29 1/2 inches (75 cm) and 46 1/2 inches (118 cm) diameter by 31 1/2 inches (80 cm) stroke. The engine was built by H C Stülcken Sohn.

== History ==
Malmö was built for Bissmark Linie GmbH of Hamburg. Her port of registry was Hamburg and she was allocated the code letters RWGC. In 1934, her code Letters were changed to DHQC. On 1 June 1942, Malmö struck a naval mine and sank south west of Malmö, Sweden. She was salvaged, repaired and returned to service. In May 1945, Malmö was seized by the Allies at Schlei. She was passed to the British MoWT and renamed Empire Contay. She was placed under the management of E T Atkinson & Sons Ltd, Hull.

In 1947, Empire Contay was sold to Oddsson & Co Ltd, Hull and was renamed Reykjanes. She was sold in 1949 to Endeavour Shipping Co Ltd, serving until 1953 when she was scrapped in Rosyth, Dunbartonshire.
