= SS Gisela L M Russ =

German cargo ship built in 1922

History
- Name: Gisela L M Russ (1922–45); Empire Consort (1945–46); Volos (1946–48); Marios II (1948–59)
- Owner: Ernst Russ (1922–45); Ministry of War Transport (1945); Ministry of Transport (1945–46); Greek Government (1946–48); M A Karageorgis (1948–59)
- Operator: Ernst Russ (1922–45); Springwell Steamship Co Ltd (1945–46); Antonaropulo Bros (1946–48); M A Karageorgis (1948–59)
- Port of registry: (Weimar Republic) Hamburg (1922–33); (Nazi Germany) Hamburg (1933–45); (United Kingdom) London (1945–46); Greece (1946–59)
- Builder: Stettiner Oderwerke AG
- Launched: 1922
- Out of service: 19 February 1959
- Identification: Code Letters RDHJ (1922–34); Code Letters DHJB (1934–45); Code Letters GFVC (1945–46); United Kingdom Official Number 180605 (1945–46)
- Fate: Sank

General characteristics
- Type: Cargo ship
- Tonnage: 1,175 GRT; 628 NRT; 2,105 DWT
- Length: 230 ft 9 in (70.33 m)
- Beam: 36 ft 4 in (11.07 m)
- Depth: 14 ft 6 in (4.42 m)
- Installed power: Triple expansion steam engine
- Propulsion: Screw propeller
- Speed: 9 knots (17 km/h)

Location of the sinking of Marios II.

Gisela L M Russ was a 1,175 GRT cargo ship that was built in 1922 by Stettiner Oderwerke AG, Stettin, Germany for German owners. She was seized by the Allies in May 1945, passed to the Ministry of War Transport (MoWT) and was renamed Empire Consort. In 1946, she was sold to the Greek Government and renamed Volos and then sold and renamed Marios II in 1948. She served until she sank in 1959 following a boiler explosion.

== Description ==
The ship was built in 1922 by Stettiner Oderwerke AG, Stettin.

The ship was 230 feet 9 inches (70.33 m) long, with a beam of 36 feet 4 inches (11.07 m) and a depth of 14 feet 6 inches (4.42 m). The ship had a GRT of 1,771 and a NRT of 785. She had a DWT of 2,105.

The ship was propelled by a triple expansion steam engine, which had cylinders of 17 1/2 inches (44 cm), 27 1/2 inches (70 cm) and diameter by 43 3/16 inches (109.7 cm) stroke. The engine was built by Stettiner Oderwerke. It could propel the ship at 9 knots (17 km/h).

== History ==
Gisela L M Russ was built for Ernst Russ, Hamburg. Her port of registry was Hamburg and the Code Letters RDHJ were allocated. Little is known of her merchant career, although it is recorded that she delivered 360 tonnes of mixed freight to Barcelona, Spain in March 1929. In 1934, her Code Letters were changed to DHJB.

Gisela L M Russ was seized by the Allies in May 1945 at Flensburg. Ownership passed to the MoWT and she was renamed Empire Consistence. She was delivered to the United Kingdom on 23 June 1945. Her port of registry was changed to London. The Code Letters GFVC and United Kingdom Official Number 180605 were allocated. She was placed under the management of the Springwell Steamship Co Ltd. In 1946, Empire Consort was sold to the Greek Government. She was renamed Volos. In 1948, she was sold to M A Karageorgis and renamed Marios II. On 19 February 1959, she suffered a boiler explosion whilst on a voyage from Stratoni to Piraeus. Although taken in tow, she sank at 38°35′N 24°21′E.
