= SS Azov (1944) =

Cargo ship

History
- Name: Deike Rickmers (1944–45); Empire Concord (1945–46); Azov (1946–73)
- Owner: Rickmers Line (1944–45); Ministry of War Transport (1945); Ministry of Transport (1945–46); Soviet Government (1946–73)
- Operator: Rickmers Line (1424–45); Dillwyn Steamship Co Ltd (1945–46); Soviet Government (1946–73)
- Port of registry: (Nazi Germany) Hamburg (1944–45); (United Kingdom) London (1945–50); Soviet Union (1946–73)
- Builder: Deutsche Werft
- Launched: 1944
- Identification: Code Letters GFQB (1945–46); United Kingdom Official Number 180720 (1945–46)
- Fate: Scrapped

General characteristics
- Tonnage: 1,923 GRT; 935 NRT
- Length: 281 ft 8 in (85.85 m)
- Beam: 44 ft 4 in (13.51 m)
- Depth: 15 ft 9 in (4.80 m)
- Installed power: 4-cylinder compound steam engine
- Propulsion: Screw propeller

Azov (Russian: Азо́в) was a 1,953 GRT cargo ship that was built in 1944 by Deutsche Werft, Hamburg, Germany as Deike Rickmers for Rickmers Line. In 1945, she was seized by the Allies and passed to the Ministry of War Transport (MoWT), renamed Empire Concord. In 1946, she was passed to the Soviet Union and renamed Azov. She served until 1973 when she was scrapped.

== Description ==
The ship was built in 1944 by Deutsche Werft, Hamburg.

The ship was 281 feet 8 inches (85.85 m) long, with a beam of 44 feet 4 inches (13.51 m) a depth of 15 feet 9 inches (4.80 m). She had a GRT of 1,953 and a NRT of 935.

The ship was propelled by a four-cylinder compound steam engine, which had two cylinders of 16 9/16 inches (42.1 cm) diameter and two cylinders of 35 7/16 inches (90.0 cm) diameter by 35 7/16 inches (90.0 cm) stroke. The engine was built by Waggon und Maschinenbau, Görlitz.

== History ==
Deike Rickmers was built for Rickmers Line, Hamburg. In May 1945, Deike Rickmers was seized by the Allies at Kiel. She was passed to the MoWT and renamed Empire Concord. She was placed under the management of the Dillwyn Steamship Co Ltd. Her port of registry was changed to London. The Code Letters GFQB and United Kingdom Official Number 180720 were allocated.

=== Soviet Union period ===
In 1946, Empire Conclyde was transferred to the Soviet Union, and was renamed Azov. Following the end of the Chinese Civil War in 1950, she was the first foreign ship to sail up the Pearl River to Canton.

In 1958, during the repair at city Dalnyi (CPP) was reconstructed for liquid fuel use and became a cargo-passenger ship as per project "Dalsudoremstroy".

The ship received IMO number 5032254. Azov served until 1973, when she was scrapped at Kure, Japan.

== Photos ==
- Steamer Азов.
