= List of Empire ships (G) =

== Suffix beginning with G ==
=== Empire Gable ===
Empire Gable was a 1,925 GRT cargo ship which was built by A Vuyk & Zonen, Capelle aan den IJssel, Netherlands. Launched in 1944 as Benue for Deutsche Afrika Line. Seized in May 1945 as a war prize at Cuxhaven. To MoWT and renamed Empire Gable. Allocated in 1946 to the USSR and renamed Sukhumi. Scrapped in December 1969 at Bo'ness, West Lothian.

=== Empire Gabon ===
Empire Gabon was a 1,925 GRT cargo ship which was built by Flensburger Schiffbau-Gesellschaft, Flensburg. Launched in 1944 as Licentia for J Jost, Flensburg. Seized in May 1945 at Flensburg, to MoWT and renamed Empire Gabon. Allocated in 1946 to USSR and renamed Riazan. Sold in 1979 to new owners in Hamburg, renamed Rudi. Resold to shipbreakers in Santander, Spain.

=== Empire Gaelic ===
Empire Gaelic was a 4,840 GRT Landing Ship, Tank (LST) which was built by Davie Shipbuilding and Repairing Co Ltd, Lauzon, Canada. Completed in June 1945 as LST 3507. Converted to a ferry for the Atlantic Steam Navigation Co Ltd and renamed Empire Gaelic. Entered service in January 1949 on the Preston to Larne service. Scrapped in September 1960 at Burcht, Belgium.

=== Empire Gaffer ===
Empire Gaffer was a 1,942 GRT cargo ship which was built by Deutsche Werft, Hamburg. Launched in 1945 as Betzdorf for F Krupp & Co, Essen. Seized in May 1945 at Kiel To MoWT and renamed Empire Gaffer. Sold in 1947 to United Baltic Corporation, London and renamed Baltrader, renamed Baltic Fir in 1952. Sold in 1956 to DDG Hansa, Bremen. Rebuilt at Bremerhaven and renamed Arsterturm. Sold in 1969 to Universal Shipping & Coastal Trading Pte Ltd, Bombay, India and renamed Unigoolnar. Sold in 1976 to Sudarsan Liners Ltd, Madras and renamed Sudarsan Shakti. Scrapped in March 1981 in Bombay.

=== Empire Gage ===
Empire Gage was a 1,925 GRT cargo ship which was built by Deutsche Werft, Hamburg. Launched in 1943 as Santander for Oldenburg-Portuguese Line. Seized in May 1945 at Copenhagen. To MoWT and renamed Empire Gage. Chartered in August 1945 to the Dutch Government and renamed Arnhem. Allocated in 1946 to USSR and renamed Yaroslavl. Scrapped in 1971 in the USSR.

=== Empire Gain ===
Empire Gain was a 3,750 GRT tanker which was built by Sir J Laing & Sons Ltd, Sunderland. Launched on 17 June 1943 and completed in September 1943. Sold in 1946 to the Anglo-Saxon Petroleum Co Ltd and renamed Barbatia. Sold in 1955 to Shell Tankers Ltd, operated under the management of Shell Petroleum Co Ltd. Seized in November 1956 by Egypt during the Suez Crisis. Allocated in 1957 to the Egyptian General Petroleum Organisation and renamed Magd. Allocated in 1961 to the United Arab Maritime Co. Attacked on 8 June 1967 and sunk by Israeli aircraft during the Six-Day War. Her wreck was cleared in 1975 as part of the preparations for the re-opening of the Suez Canal.

=== Empire Gala (I) ===
Empire Gala was a 1,923 GRT cargo ship which was built by Nederland Scheepvaart, Amsterdam. Launched in 1944 as Weserstrand for Norddeutscher Lloyd, Bremen. Seized in May 1945 at Kiel. To MoWT and renamed Empire Gala. Allocated in 1946 to USSR and renamed Podolsk. Ran aground on 9 January 1948 at Amhurst Rocks, in the Yangtze Estuary, 60 miles (97 km) from Wusong. Sank on 11 January 1948.

=== Empire Gala (II) ===
Empire Gala was a 9,074 GRT Park ship which was built by Joseph L Thompson & Sons, Sunderland. Launched as Empire Gala but completed as Bir Hakeim for the French Government. Sold to Panama in 1958 and renamed Marionga Maris. Reflagged to Greece in 1961. Sold in 1965 to Liberia and renamed Everlucky. Sold c.1968 to Taiwan and renamed Maritime Express. Scrapped in January 1970 at Kaohsiung, Taiwan.

=== Empire Galahad ===
Empire Galahad was a 7,046 GRT refrigerated cargo ship which was built by Lithgows Ltd, Port Glasgow. Launched on 18 May 1942 and completed in July 1942. Sold in 1946 to Blue Star Line Ltd and renamed Celtic Star. Sold in 1947 to Lamport & Holt Line Ltd and renamed Murillo. Sold in 1952 to Industriale Maritima SpA, Genoa and renamed Bogliasco. Diesel engine fitted in 1954. Sold in 1963 to Ocean Shipping & Enterprises SA, Panama and renamed Ocean Peace. Arrived on 13 September 1967 at Kaohsiung, Taiwan for scrapping.

=== Empire Galashiels ===
Empire Galashiels was a 1,923 GRT cargo ship which was built by Neptun AG, Rostock. Launched in 1944 as Gunther for Hamburg South America Line. Seized in May 1945 at Rostock. To MoWT and renamed Empire Galashiels. Allocated in 1946 to USSR and renamed Smolensk. Scrapped in 1976 in USSR.

=== Empire Galaxy ===
Empire Galaxy was a 1,849 GRT cargo ship which was built by Neptun AG, Rostock. Launched in 1927 as Capri for R M Sloman Jr, Hamburg. Seized in May 1945 at Kiel. To MoWT and renamed Empire Galaxy. Allocated in 1946 to USSR and renamed Naderjda Krupskiar. Removed from shipping registers in 1956.

=== Empire Galbraith ===
Empire Galbraith was a 1,923 GRT cargo ship which was built by Verschure & Co's Scheepswerft en Maschinenfabriek, Amsterdam. Launched in 1944 as Hendrik Fisser V for Fisser & Van Doornum, Emden. Seized in May 1945 at Kiel in a damaged condition. To MoWT and renamed Empire Galbraith. Sold in 1946 to Currie Line Ltd, Leith and renamed Highland. Sold in 1959 to Dundee, Perth & London Shipping Co Ltd and renamed Gowrie. Sold in 1963 to G Vlassis & Co, Greece, and renamed Hermanos. Scrapped in December 1969 in Vado, Italy.

=== Empire Gale ===
Empire Gale was a 7,122 GRT cargo ship which was built by Vickers-Armstrongs Ltd, Barrow in Furness. Launched on 29 April 1941 and completed in June 1941. Sold in 1946 to Medomsley Steam Shipping Co Ltd and renamed Langleedale. Sold in 1953 to Compagnia Navigazione Logos SA, Greece and renamed Entopan. Arrived on 12 July 1968 at Whampoa, Hong Kong for scrapping. Note: Ship is mentioned as CAM ship in Hague records (e.g. SC.65).

=== Empire Galena ===
Empire Galena was a 1,925 GRT cargo ship which was built by J Cockerill SA, Hoboken, Belgium. Launched in 1943 as Weserstrom for Norddeutscher Lloyd, Bremen. Seized in May 1945 at Kiel. To MoWT and renamed Empire Galena. Sold in 1946 to the General Steam Navigation Co Ltd and renamed Albatross. Sold in 1958 to National Shipping Lines of South Africa and renamed Port Capetown. Sold in 1959 to African Coasters (Pty) Ltd, Durban and renamed Frontier. Sold in 1966 to Summit Navigation Co, Hong Kong, and renamed Fortune. Scrapped in December 1968 in Hong Kong.

=== Empire Gallant ===
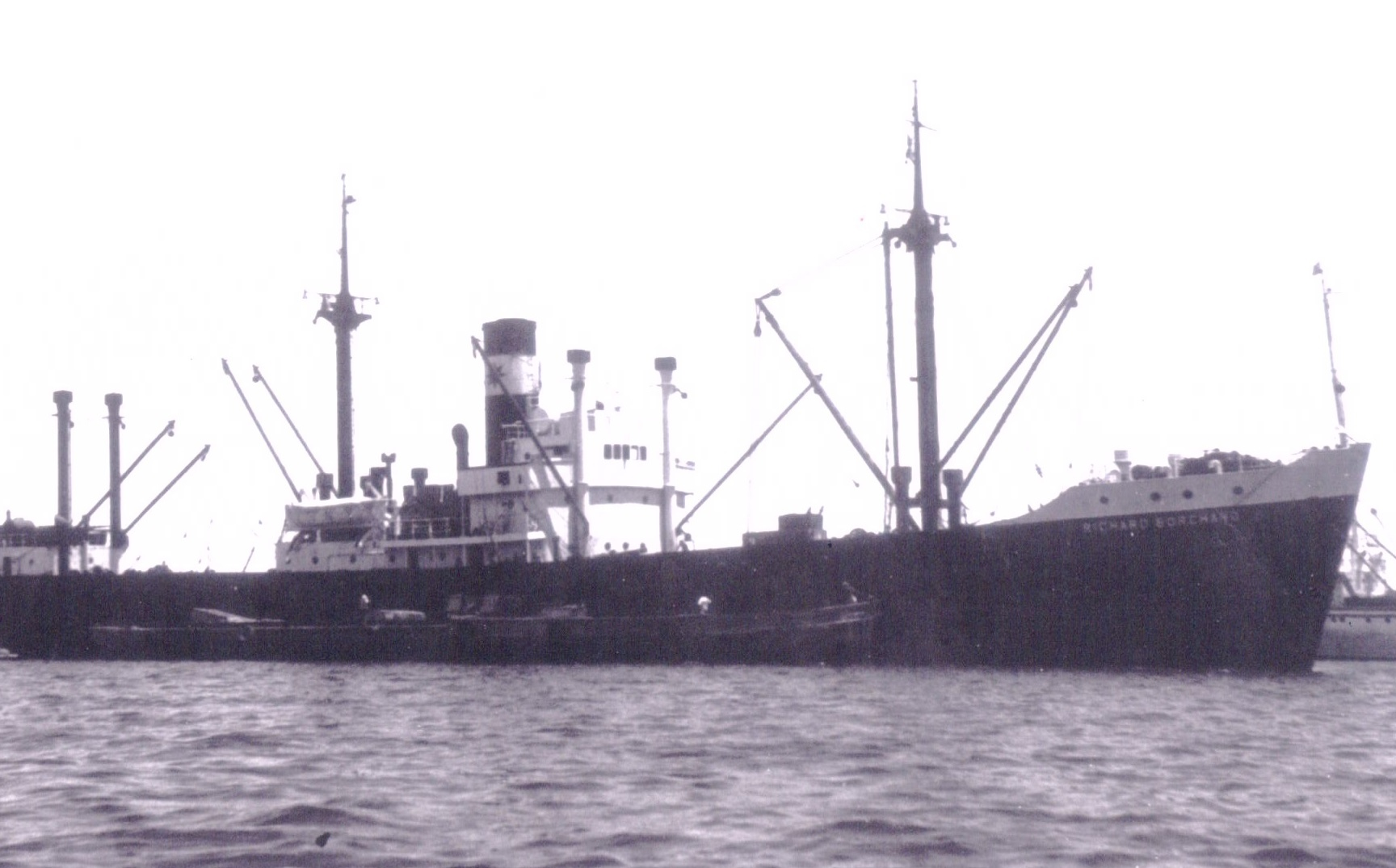
Richard Borchard

Empire Gallant was a 1,923 GRT cargo ship which was built by Lübecker Maschinenbau-Gesellschaft, Lübeck. Launched in 1943 as Celia for A Kirsten, Hamburg. Seized in May 1945 at Flensburg. To MoWT and renamed Empire Gallant. Sold in 1947 to Borchard (UK) Ltd and renamed Richard Borchard. Sold in 1960 to Fairplay Reederei, Richard Borchard GmbH, Hamburg and renamed Fairwood. Scrapped in January 1963 at Sarpsborg, Norway.

=== Empire Galleon ===
Empire Galleon was a 1,923 GRT cargo ship which was built by Van Vliet & Co, Hardinxveld, Netherlands. Launched in 1944 as Elmenhorst for Bock, Godeffroy & Co, Hamburg. Seized in May 1945 at Kiel. To MoWT and renamed Empire Galleon. Allocated in 1946 to USSR and renamed Kazan. Scrapped in 1973 in USSR.

=== Empire Gallery ===
Empire Gallery was a 1,925 GRT cargo ship which was built by P Smit, Rotterdam. Launched in 1944 as Weserburg for Norddeutscher Lloyd, Bremen. Seized in May 1945 at Kiel. to MoWT and renamed Empire Gallery. On 10 October 1945 she struck a mine 15 nautical miles (28 km) off the Cordouan lighthouse and was disabled. Towed to Le Verdon-sur-Mer. Arrived on 7 January 1946 under tow at Penarth for repairs. Sold in 1947 to Straits Steamship Co Ltd, Singapore and renamed Kampar. Sold in 1957 to Hellenic Lines Ltd, Greece, and renamed Anglia. Sold in 1958 to Universal Cargo Carriers, Panama. Scrapped in April 1974 in Gemlik, Turkey.

=== Empire Galliard ===
Empire Galliard was a 7,170 GRT cargo ship which was built by J L Thompson & Sons Ltd, Sunderland. Launched on 27 June 1942 and completed in September 1942. Allocated in 1943 to the Dutch Government and renamed Aert van der Neer. Sold in 1946 to Koninklijke Hollandsche Lloyd and renamed Maasland. Sold in 1959 to Cerrahogullari Umumi Nakliyat Vapurculuk ve Ticaret TAS, Turkey and renamed M Borgul. Scrapped in October 1966 in Istanbul.

=== Empire Gallic ===
Empire Gallic was a 1,944 GRT cargo ship which was built by T U K Smit, Netherlands. Launched in 1944 and completed by Deutsche Werft, Hamburg as Hendrik Fisser VII for Fisser & Van Doornum, Emden. Seized in May 1945 at Kiel. To MoWT and renamed Empire Gallic. Allocated in 1946 to USSR and renamed Rjev. Scrapped in July 1970 in Hamburg.

=== Empire Gallop ===
Empire Gallop was a 1,944 GRT cargo ship which was built by Deutsche Werft, Hamburg. Launched in 1944 as Fangturm for DDG Hansa, Bremen. Seized in May 1945 at Kiel. To MoWT and renamed Empire Gallop. Sold in 1947 to the United Baltic Corporation, London, and renamed Baltonia. Renamed Baltic Oak in 1953. Sold in 1957 to Bock, Godeffroy & Co, Germany, and renamed Palmyra. Collided on 27 March 1962 with British Mariner 18 nautical miles (33 km) of Ushant, France and sank.

=== Empire Galloper ===
The name Empire Galloper was not used on any ship, although it was allocated. It is thought that the ship that the name was intended for was a 7,000 GRT cargo ship which was laid down at Kockums Meckaniska Verstad, Malmö, Sweden. Launched in 1940 as Octavi for German owners. Taken to Deutsche Werft, Hamburg for completion. Seized in May 1945 in an incomplete state at Hamburg. Allocated in 1946 to Belgium without an "Empire" name being confirmed. Towed to Antwerp for completion by Mercantile Marine Engineering & Graving Docks Co. Completed as 6,917 GRT El Gaucho for Sociedad Anónima Comercial de Exportación y Importación y Financera, Argentina. Sold in 1964 to Mararte Compañia de Navigazione, Panama and renamed Rosarino. Operated under the management of Dodero Line, Argentina. Renamed Plate Lancer in 1967 and management transferred to Compagnie Maritime et Commerciale, Paris. On 8 April 1969 suffered a major engine breakdown. Repairs were found to be uneconomic so she was scrapped in September 1969 in Hamburg.

=== Empire Galveston ===
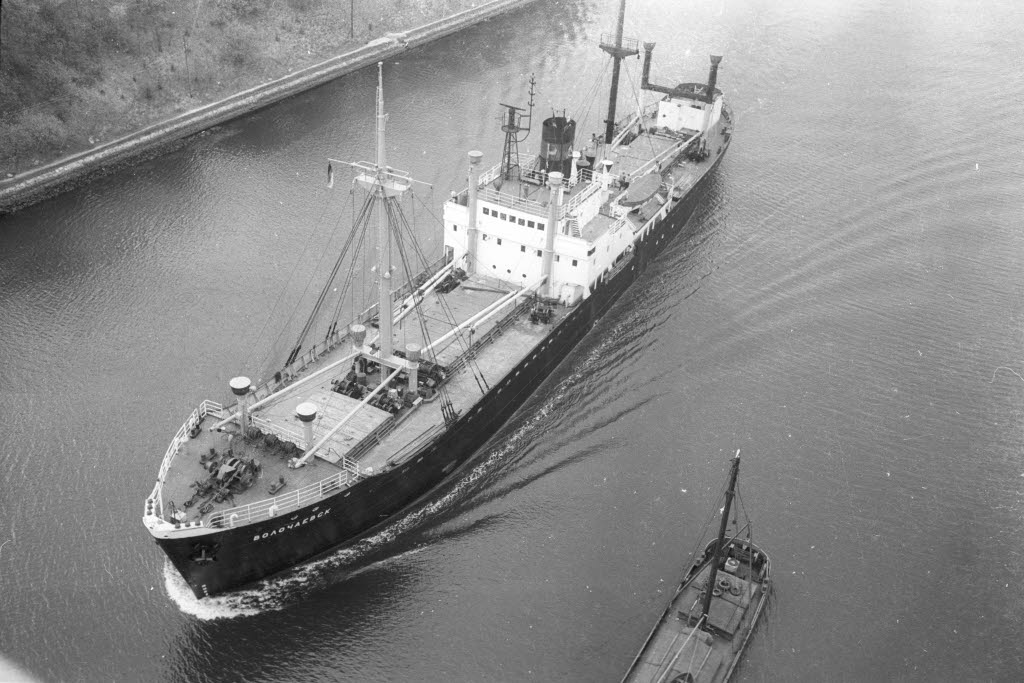
Volochayevsk

Empire Galveston was a 1,925 GRT cargo ship which was built by Deutsche Werft, Hamburg. Launched in 1944 as Weserwald for Norddeutscher Lloyd, Bremen. Seized in May 1945 at Flensburg. To MoWT and renamed Empire Galveston. Allocated in 1946 to USSR and renamed Volochayevsk. Scrapped in 1973 in USSR.

=== Empire Galway ===
Empire Galway was a 1,944 GRT cargo ship which was built by Deutsche Werft, Hamburg. Launched in 1944 as Schauenberg for H Schuldt, Hamburg. Seized in May 1945 at Flensburg. To MoWT and renamed Empire Galway. Allocated in 1946 to Belgium. To Ministry of Marine, Belgian Government and renamed Kinshasa. Sold in 1950 to Compagnie Maritime Congolaise, Belgium. Sold in 1951 to D/S A/S Ibis, Norway, and renamed Anne Reed. Rebuilt in 1956 at Hamburg for DDG Hansa, Bremen and renamed Pagenturm. Scrapped in June 1964 at Spezia, Italy.

=== Empire Gambia ===
Empire Gambia was a 7,074 GRT cargo ship which was built by Harland & Wolff Ltd, Glasgow. Launched on 14 May 1944 and completed in July 1945. Sold in 1946 to King Line Ltd and renamed King Edgar. Operated under the management of Dodd, Thompson & Co Ltd, London. Arrived on 4 May 1959 at Kobe, Japan for scrapping.

=== Empire Game ===
Empire Game was a 1,925 GRT cargo ship which was built by Van der Giessen, Krimpen aan den IJssel. Launched in 1943 as Brunhilde for Hamburg South-America Line. Seized in May 1945 at Kiel. To MoWT and renamed Empire Game. Sold in 1947 to Mundus Export & Shipping Co and renamed Canford. Rebuilt in 1956 at Bremerhaven for DDG Hansa, Bremen and renamed Fangturm. Sold in 1961 to Rio Pardo, Beirut and renamed Panaghia Lourion. Sold in 1967 to Tamrai Compagnia Navigazione, Greece and renamed Aghia Thalassini. Sold in 1970 to Aldebaran Shipping Co, Cyprus. Scrapped in 1974 in Greece.

=== Empire Ganges ===
Empire Ganges was a 3,750 GRT tanker which was built by J L Thompson & Sons Ltd, Sunderland. Launched on 18 September 1944 and completed in January 1945. Sold in 1946 to Anglo-Saxon Petroleum Co Ltd and renamed Bolma. Sold in 1955 to Shell Tankers Ltd, operated under the management of Shell Petroleum Co Ltd. Sold in 1956 to F T Everard & Sons Ltd and renamed Astrality. Sold in 1965 to Marittima Fluviale Meridionale and renamed Monte Berico. Operated under the management of V Bellerino, Italy. Sold in 1967 to Venezia Tankers SAS, Italy and then in 1973 to Misano de Navigazione, SpA, Palermo. Sold in 1976 to F S Salonia, Rome and then in 1977 to Maralba SpA, Palermo. Scrapped in November 1978 in Spezia, Italy.

=== Empire Gangway ===
Empire Gangway was a 1,942 GRT cargo ship which was built by Deutsche Werft, Hamburg. Launched in 1944 as Weserwehr for Norddeutscher Lloyd, Bremen. Seized in May 1945 at Bremerhaven. To MoWT and renamed Empire Gangway. Allocated in 1946 to Canada. Sold in 1948 to Clark Steamship Co, Montreal, Quebec. Renamed Novaport in 1950. Sold in 1964 to Eagle Ocean Transport Inc, Panama, and renamed Fury. On 1 December 1964 she was driven ashore at Wedge Island, Nova Scotia in hurricane-force winds. Ended up stranded on an inshore reef and declared a total loss.

=== Empire Gannet (I) ===
Empire Gannet was a 5,627 GRT cargo ship which was built by J. F. Duthie & Company, Seattle for the United States Shipping Board. Launched in 1919 as Dewey. Sold in 1928 to Oceanic & Oriental Nav. Co, San Francisco and renamed Golden Fleece. Sold in 1937 to American Hawaiian Steamship Co, New York and renamed Louisianian. To MoWT in 1940 and renamed Empire Gannet managed by Runciman Ltd. Sold to Aurora Shipping Co in 1946 and renamed Arion. Operated under the management of Goulandris Bros, London. Sold in 1949 to Cia Maritima del Este, Panama, still the management of Goulandris Bros. Sold in 1955 to Soc de Navegaceon Arion, Panama, remaining under the management of Goulandris Bros. Sold in 1956 to Cia de Vapores San Elefterio, Panama, renamed St. Elefterio. Sprang a leak and sank on 6 February 1958 at 21°54′N 64°46′W.

=== Empire Gannet (II) ===
Empire Gannet was a 4,259 GRT LST (3) which was built by Harland and Wolff Ltd, Belfast. Launched in March 1945 as LST 3006, later commissioned as HMS Tromsø. To Ministry of Transport (MoT) in 1956 and renamed Empire Gannet registered in London. Operated under the management of British India Steam Navigation Co Ltd. Scrapped in August 1968 in Singapore.

=== Empire Gantock ===
Empire Gantock was a 7,331 GRT cargo ship which was built by Shipbuilding Corporation Ltd, Newcastle upon Tyne. Launched on 16 April 1942 as Empire Gantock and completed in August 1946 as Martita for Kaye, Son & Co Ltd. Sold in 1960 to Compagnia Navigazione Almadin, Greece, and renamed Maroudio. Sold in 1965 to Panafrica Atlantic Corp, Panama and renamed Thalie. Operated under the management of East and West Africa Shipping Co. Arrived on 15 June 1968 at Vado for scrapping.

=== Empire Gantry ===
Empire Gantry was a 1.925 GRT cargo ship which was built by Werf de Noord, Alblasserdam, Netherlands. Launched in 1944 as Imkenturm for DDG Hansa, Bremen. Completed by Flensburger Schiff-Geschellschaft, Flensburg. Seized in May 1945 at Flensburg. To MoWT and renamed Empire Gantry. Allocated in 1946 to USSR and renamed Feodosia. Sold in 1947 to Gdynia America Lines, Poland. Sold in 1951 to Polska Żegluga Morska, Szczecin and renamed Olsztyn. Scrapped in January 1972 in Bruges.

=== Empire Ganymede ===
Empire Ganymede was a 1,923 GRT cargo ship which was built by Deutsche Werft, Hamburg. Launched in 1944 as Adamsturm for DDG Hansa, Bremen. Seized in May 1945 at Hamburg. To MoWT and renamed Empire Ganymede. Sold in 1947 to United Baltic Corporation and renamed Baltanglia. Renamed Baltic Pine in 1952. Sold in 1954 to Hellenic Lines, Greece, and renamed Germania. Collided on 26 April 1955 with SS Maro 4 nautical miles (7.4 km) south of Beachy Head, Sussex and grounded near the Beachy Head Lighthouse. Refloated on 30 November 1955 and beached in Pevensey Bay with her back broken. Declared a constructive total loss. Sold and towed to Germany where she was repaired. Sold to Argo Line, Bremen and renamed Auriga. Scrapped in January 1965 in Bremerhaven, Germany.

=== Empire Garden ===
Empire Garden was an 8,923 GRT tanker which was built by Howaldtswerke, Kiel. Completed in 1919 as Gedania for Baltisch-Amerikanische Petroleum Import Gesellschaft, Danzig. Requisitioned by the Kriegsmarine in 1940 and converted in 1941 at St Nazaire to a supply vessel. Captured on 4 June 1941 near Iceland by HMS Marsdale. To MoWT and renamed Empire Garden. Sold in 1947 to Christian Salvesen Ltd, Leith and renamed Southern Garden. Scrapped in August 1960 in Inverkeithing, Fife.

=== Empire Gareth ===
Empire Gareth was a 2,873 GRT cargo ship which was built by William Gray & Company, West Hartlepool. Launched on 1 May 1942 and completed in June 1942. Sold in 1947 to WH Cockerline & Co Ltd, Hull and renamed Athenic. Sold in 1954 to Société Anonyme Maritime et Commerciale, Switzerland and renamed Astarte. Sold in 1960 to A Halcoussis & Co, Greece and renamed Yanix. Sold in 1961 to Nicos Compagnia Navigazione SA and renamed Nicos. Operated under the management of Halcoussis. Arrived on 7 January 1968 at Palermo under tow with engine damage. Laid up, towed to Spezia where she arrived on 6 May 1968 for scrapping.

=== Empire Garland ===
Empire Garland was a 1,925 GRT cargo ship which was built by Stettiner Vulkan Werft AG, Stettin. Launched in 1944 as Njong for Deutsche-Afrika Line. Seized in May 1945 at Flensburg. To MoWT and renamed Empire Garland. Sold in 1947 to the General Steam Navigation Co Ltd and renamed Sheldrake. Sold in 1959 to Johal Navigation Ltd, Liberia and renamed Salemstar. Sold in 1960 to Johal Navigation Ltd, Greece, and renamed Ambelos. Sold in 1961 to N J Goumas, Greece, and renamed Marmina. Sold in 1968 to C Raikos & F Raikou, Greece, and renamed Filio. Scrapped in June 1972 in Aspropyrgos, Greece.

=== Empire Garner ===
Empire Garner was a 1,923 GRT cargo ship which was built by NV Werft Gusto, Schiedam, Netherlands. Launched in 1943 as Hendrik Fisser VI for Fisser & Van Doornum, Emden. Seized in May 1945 at Kiel. To MoWT and renamed Empire Garner. Allocated to USSR in 1946 and renamed Ribinsk.

=== Empire Garnet ===
Empire Garnet was a 298 GRT coastal tanker which was built by Rowhedge Ironworks Ltd, Rowhedge, Essex. Launched on 10 July 1941 as Empire Garnet and completed in November 1941 as Empire Lad. Sold in 1946 to Anglo-American Oil Co Ltd and renamed Esso Suwanee Sold in 1951 to Esso Petroleum Co Ltd. Sold in 1960 to P L Den Breejen, Netherlands. Sold in 1963 to Compagnia Comercio Navigazione Alpes, Panama. Converted to carry dry cargo, now 331 GRT and renamed USA. Sold in 1966 to Autco SA, Panama, and renamed Pejerey. Renamed Esterel in 1966. Sold in 1968 to Columbo Shipping Co, Panama and renamed Westerend. Sold in 1970 to Albina SA, Panama, renamed Sunrise then Grace. Sold in 1971 to D P Gousetis, Greece, and renamed Captain Stelios. Sold in 1975 to C Dagadakis, Greece, and renamed San Liberal. Sold in 1977 to E & G Kottis, Greece, and renamed Kleopatra.

=== Empire Garrick ===
Empire Garrick was an 8,128 GRT tanker which was built by Swan, Hunter & Wigham Richardson Ltd, Wallsend. Launched on 14 May 1942 and completed in July 1942. Sold in 1945 to the British Tanker Co Ltd and renamed British Guardsman. Sold in 1951 to British Oil Shipping Co Ltd and renamed Alan Evelyn. Operated under the management of Stevinson, Hardy & Co Ltd, London. Sold in 1955 to Duff, Herbert & Mitchell Ltd and renamed Westbrook. Fire amidships on 28 July 1959 when laid up at Barry, Glamorgan. Sold for scrapping, arrived on 16 March 1960 at Cashmore's, Newport, Monmouthshire.

=== Empire Garrison ===
Empire Garrison was a 1,925 GRT cargo ship which was built by Maatschappij de Schelde, Vlissingen. Launched in 1944 as Kalliope for Neptun Line, Bremen. Seized in May 1945 at Flensburg. To MoWT and renamed Empire Garrison. Sold in 1947 to the Ulster Steamship Co Ltd and renamed Bengore Head. Operated under the management of G Heyn & Sons. Sold in 1967 to Canopus Shipping SA, Greece, and renamed Agios Nektarios. Sold in 1971 to Aldebaran Shipping Co, Cyprus. Scrapped in January 1974 in Spain.

=== Empire Garry ===
Empire Garry was an 8,457 GRT cargo ship which was built by Deutsche Schiff- und Maschinenbau, Bremen. Launched in 1928 as Treuenfels for DDG Hansa, Bremen. Seized in June 1945 at Aarhus, Denmark. Taken to Kiel and laid up for 18 months. Arrived in Leith in March 1947. To MoT and renamed Empire Garry. Sold in 1949 to Haddon Steamship Co Ltd and renamed Vergray. Sold in 1951 to Israel-America Line, Israel and renamed Elath. Sold in 1956 to Nichiro Gyogyo KK, Japan, and renamed Shinano Maru. A new diesel engine was fitted in 1961 when she was converted to a fish factory ship, now 9,035 GRT. Scrapped in August 1972 in Taiwan.

=== Empire Garston ===
Empire Garston was a 1,958 GRT cargo ship which was built by Flensburger Schiff-Gesellschaft, Flensburg. Launched in 1930 as Lipari for R M Sloman, Hamburg. Interned on 30 December 1942 at Cartagena, Spain. Surrendered to UK in 1945. To MoWT and renamed Empire Garston. Allocated in 1946 to the Netherlands. To Dutch Government and renamed Arnhem. Sold in 1947 to Koninklijke Nederlandsche Stoomboot Maatschappij and renamed Orion. Scrapped in 1960 in Antwerp.

=== Empire Gat ===
Empire Gat was an 871 GRT coaster which was built by A & J Inglis Ltd, Glasgow. Launched on 13 November 1940 and completed in April 1941. Sold in 1947 to G Gibson & Co Ltd and renamed Borthwick. Sold in 1960 to Ubaldo Gennari fu Torqueto & Co, Italy and renamed Agostino. Sold in 1971 to Sinavi, Italy. Sold in 1972 to Ivy Shipping Co SA, Panama, and renamed Ivy. Deleted from shipping registers in 1986.

=== Empire Gatehouse ===
Empire Gatehouse was a 1,924 GRT cargo ship which was built by Lübecker Flenderwerke AG, Lübeck. Launched in 1943 as Tiefland for Hamburg South America Line. Seized in May 1945 at Brunsbüttel. To MoWT and renamed Empire Gatehouse. Allocated in 1947 to Canada. To Gulfport Steamship Co, Montreal and renamed Gulfport. Sold in 1964 to Alma Shipping Co, Liberia, and renamed Stefani. Sold in 1966 to M N Arcadis, Liberia and renamed Agia Marina. Sold in 1967 to Bright Shipping Co, Greece, and renamed Bright. Sold in 1969 to Khalda Shipping Co, Panama, and renamed Khalda. Grounded in December 1970 in the Gulf of Suez, refloated on 1 January 1971. Under arrest in 1974 at Massawa, Ethiopia. Sold in 1977 by Court Order to A W & Y F Obeid, Massawa. Reported to be in a damaged condition at the time and to have been scrapped in 1982.

=== Empire Gatwick ===
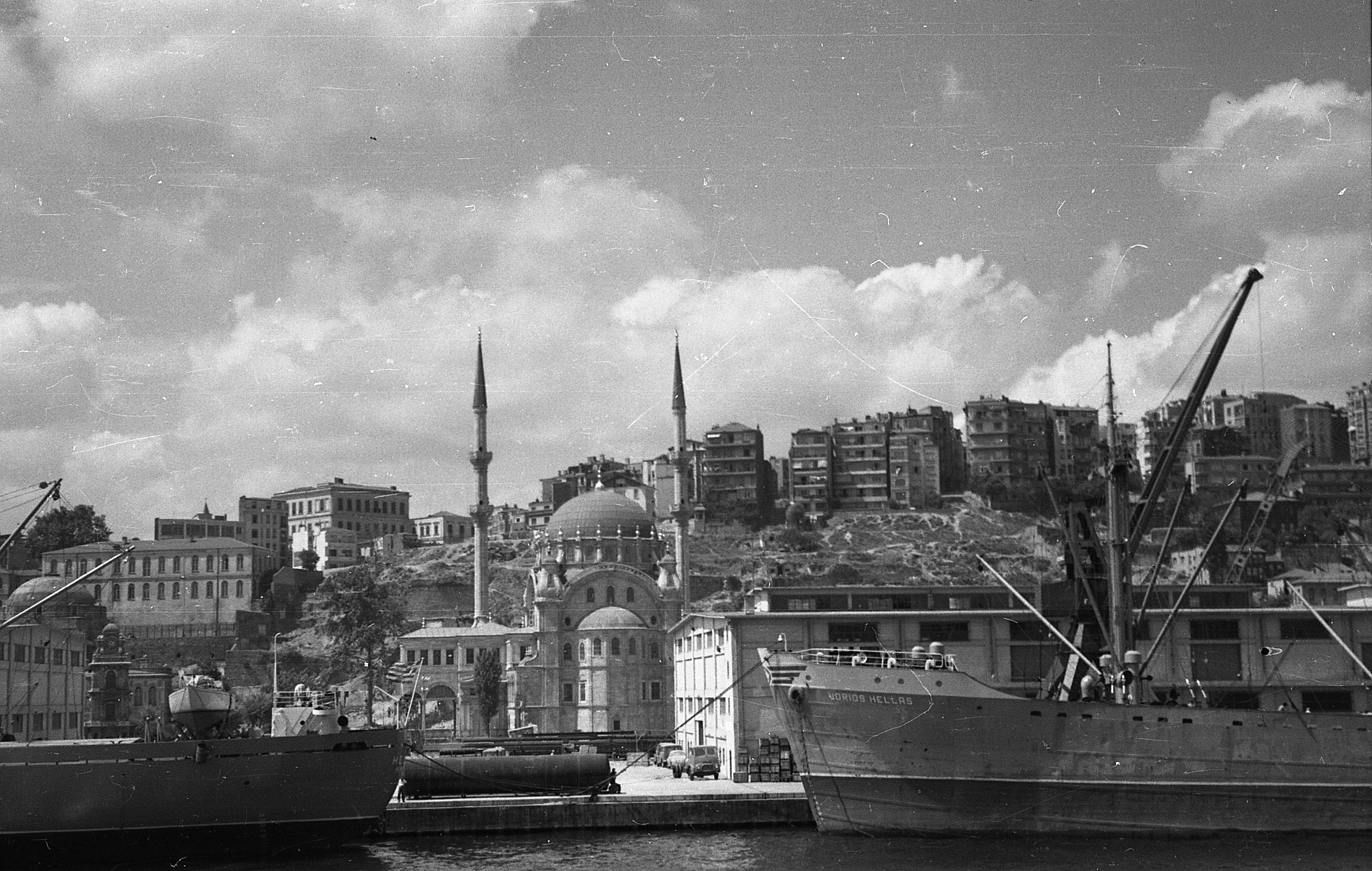
Vorios Hellas

Empire Gatwick was a 1,923 GRT cargo ship which was built by Lübecker Flenderwerke AG, Lübeck. Launched in 1944 as Sanga for Deutsche Afrika Line. Seized in May 1945 at Copenhagen. To MoWT and renamed Empire Gatwick. Allocated in 1947 to Greece. To Greek Government and renamed Vorios Hellas. Sold in 1948 to Hellenic Lines, Greece. Sold in 1974 to Papageorgiou Bros, Greece. Scrapped in April 1974 in Gemlik, Turkey.

=== Empire Gauntlet ===
Empire Gauntlet was a 7,177 GRT Landing Ship, Infantry (LSI) which was built by Consolidated Steel Corporation, Wilmington, California. Laid down as Cape Comorin and completed in January 1944 as Empire Gauntlet. To Royal Navy in 1944 as HMS Sefton. To MoWT in September 1946 and renamed Empire Gauntlet. To United States Maritime Commission (USMC) in 1947 and renamed Cape Comorin. Scrapped in December 1964 in Portsmouth, Virginia.

=== Empire Gavel ===
Empire Gavel was a 1,923 GRT cargo ship which was built by Lübecker Flenderwerke AG, Lübeck. Launched in 1944 as Setubal for Oldenberg-Portuguese Line. Seized in May 1945 at Lübeck. To MoWT and renamed Empire Gavel. Allocated to Greece in 1946 and renamed Rodopi. Sold in 1949 to Hellenic Lines, Greece. Scrapped in April 1974 in Turkey.

=== Empire Gawain ===
Empire Gawain was a 784 GRT coastal tanker which was built by Grangemouth Dockyard Co Ltd, Grangemouth. Launched on 16 April 1942 and completed in June 1942. Sold in 1946 to Anglo-American Oil Co Ltd and renamed Esso Dakotah. Sold in 1951 to Esso Petroleum Co Ltd. Scrapped in 1962 in Boom, Belgium.

=== Empire Gazelle ===
Empire Gazelle was a 4,828 GRT cargo ship which was built by Todd Drydock and Construction Company, Tacoma, Washington. Launched in 1919 as Higho for the United States Shipping Board (USSB). To American West African Line in 1928. Operated under the management of Barber Steamship Lines Inc. To MoWT in 1941 and renamed Empire Gazelle, managed by Charente S.S. Company (Harrison Line). Sold in 1946 to Williamson & Co Ltd, Hong Kong, and renamed Inchmay. Scrapped in 1954 at Yawata, Japan.

=== Empire Gem ===
- Empire Gem (shipwreck and remains)
- U.S. National Register of Historic Places
- Location: Address Restricted, near Cape Hatteras, North Carolina
- Area: 0 acres (0 ha)
- Built: 1941-1942
- MPS: World War II Shipwrecks along the East Coast and Gulf of Mexico
- NRHP reference No.: 13000782
- Added to NRHP: 25 September 2013

SS Empire Gem was an 8,139 GRT tanker which was built by Harland & Wolff Ltd, Govan. Launched on 29 May 1941 and completed in September 1941. Torpedoed on 24 January 1942 by U-66 at 35°06′N 74°58′W. Broke in two, stern section sank, bow section taken in tow but sank at 35°02′N 75°33′W.

The wreck and remains of the Empire Gem were listed on the National Register of Historic Places in 2013.

=== Empire Gemsbuck ===
Empire Gemsbuck was a 5,919 GRT cargo ship which was built by the Ames Shipbuilding and Drydock Company, Seattle. Ordered during the First World War as War Juno for the British Shipping Controller. Completed in June 1919 as Western Glenn for the USSB. To Williams Steamship Co Inc, New York in 1927 and renamed Willwello. To American Intercoastal Steamship Corp, New York in 1928. To Pacific-Atlantic Steamship Company, Portland, Oregon in 1929 and renamed San Felipe. To Ministry of Supply in 1940 and renamed Empire Gemsbuck. Torpedoed on 3 November 1941 and sunk by U-203 at 52°18′N 53°05′W while a member of Convoy SC 52.

=== Empire General ===
Empire General was a 7,359 GRT cargo ship which was built by William Doxford & Sons Ltd, Sunderland. Launched on 11 November 1943 and completed in March 1944. Sold in 1947 to the West Hartlepool Steam Navigation Co Ltd and renamed Hendonhall. Sold in 1958 to Lebanesa Ltda SA, Panama and renamed Taxiarhis. Operated under the management of L Nomikos, Greece. On 3 June 1958, she suffered a fire while at Bahrain and was beached. Refloated on 8 June and sailed in ballast to South Shields for repairs. Renamed Tony C in 1971, scrapped in April 1972 at Skaramagas, Greece.

=== Empire George ===
Empire George was to have been a 235 GRT tug which was built by A Hall & Co Ltd, Aberdeen. The contract for building her was cancelled when she was two-thirds complete and she was scrapped on the stocks.

=== Empire Geraint ===
Empire Geraint was a 7,030 GRT cargo ship which was built by C Connell & Co Ltd, Glasgow. Launched on 1 September 1942 and completed in December 1942. Torpedoed on 6 March 1945 and damaged by U-775 off Milford Haven. Beached with her back broken. Refloated on 30 April 1945 and towed to Newport, Monmouthshire for repairs. Sold in 1946 to Lamport & Holt Line Ltd and renamed Millais. Sold in 1952 to Blue Star Line and renamed Oregon Star. Sold in 1954 to Iris Shipping & Trading Corp, Panama, and renamed Captayannis. Operated under the management of Syros Shipping Co Ltd, London. on 28 February 1962 she ran aground off the Goeree lighthouse, Netherlands (51°40′N 03°25′E). Refloated and towed to Rotterdam. Uneconomic to repair, sold and scrapped in April 1962 at Hendrik-Ido-Ambacht.

=== Empire Ghyll ===
Empire Ghyll was a 2,011 GRT collier which was built by Grangemouth Dockyard Ltd, Grangemouth. Launched on 9 June 1941 and completed in September 1941. Struck a mine on 18 October 1941 and sank in the Barrow Deep, Thames Estuary.

=== Empire Gilbert ===
Empire Gilbert was a 6,640 GRT cargo ship which was built by Bartram & Sons Ltd, Sunderland. Launched on 28 July 1941 and completed in October 1941. Torpedoed on 2 November 1942 and sunk by German submarine U-586 at 70°15′N 13°50′E.

=== Empire Gillian ===
Empire Gillian was a 306 GRT coaster which was built by Richards Ironworks Ltd, Lowestoft. Launched on 24 May 1944 and completed in August 1944. To the French Government in 1945 and renamed Brescou. Sold to Compagnie Meridionele de Navigation, France. Scrapped in August 1970 in La Seyne, France.

=== Empire Glade ===
Empire Glade was a 7,006 GRT cargo ship which was built by Barclay, Curle & Co Ltd, Glasgow. Launched on 12 June 1941 and completed in September 1941. The ship was one of 12 in the first large convoy redeploying Australian troops from the Middle East, designated SU.1 with 10,090 troops under escort led by HMS Royal Sovereign, sailing in early March 1942 from Colombo to Australia. Managed by Blue Star Line and damaged on 28 November 1942 by gunfire from U-67 at 17°16′N 48°44′W. Sold in 1945 to Ulster Steamship Co Ltd and renamed Inishowen Head. Sold in 1962 to Platsani Ltda SA, and renamed Maria N. Operated under the management of L Nomicos, Greece. Arrived under tow on 10 July 1972 at Istanbul for scrapping.

=== Empire Gladstone ===
Empire Gladstone was a 7,090 GRT cargo ship which was built by Shipbuilding Corporation Ltd, Sunderland. Launched on 24 February 1944 and completed in May 1944. Ran aground on 5 September 1950 at Haystack Rock, 8 nautical miles (15 km) north of Twofold Point (36°56′S 149°57′E). Declared a total loss, sold locally on 21 September 1950 for scrapping.

=== Empire Glen ===
Empire Glen was a 6,327 GRT cargo ship which was built by C Connell & Co Ltd, Glasgow. Launched on 24 May 1941 and completed in July 1941. Sold in 1945 to Alexander Shipping Co and renamed Aylesbury. Operated under the management of Capper, Alexander & Co. Sold in 1948 to Gibbs & Co, Cardiff and renamed West Wales. Sold in 1961 to Iranian Lloyd Co Ltd, Iran and renamed Persian Xerxes. Scrapped in September 1964 at Hendrik-Ido-Ambacht, Netherlands.

=== Empire Glencoe ===
Empire Glencoe was a 4,854 GRT cargo ship which was built by Nordseewerke, Emden. Launched in 1941 as Atlas for German owners. Sunk in 1941 in an air raid, later raised. Seized in May 1945 at Kiel in an incomplete state. Completed in 1948, to MoT in and renamed Empire Glencoe. Sale to H P Lenaghan & Son, Belfast and renaming to Bantry Bay in 1952-55 not completed. Sold in 1955 to Karl Gross KG, Bremen and renamed Regine. Renamed Regine Ohlrogge in 1956 and reverted to Regine in 1959. Scrapped in Santander, Spain in September 1976.

=== Empire Glory ===
Empire Glory was a 7,290 GRT cargo ship which was built by Burntisland Shipbuilding Company Ltd, Fife. Launched on 20 April 1943 and completed in June 1943. Sold in 1948 to British India Steam Navigation Co Ltd and renamed Goalpara. Sold in 1953 to Bharat Line Ltd, India, and renamed Bharatveer. Came ashore on 21 October 1953 5 nautical miles (9.3 km) north of Madras in a cyclone. A fire broke out on 23 October and the vessel was a constructive total loss, so she was sold in Bombay in January 1964 for scrapping.

=== Empire Gnome ===
Empire Gnome was a 235 GRT tug which was built by A Hall & Co, Aberdeen. Launched on 30 April 1942 and completed in July 1942. sold in 1949 to Nederland-Indonesia Steenkolen Handel Maatschappij and renamed Jacobs. Sold in 1959 to the Government of Indonesia. Sold in 1961 to P T Pelayaran Adhiguna, Indonesia and renamed Laut Jamdena. Sold in 1972 to Bahadjas Raya, Indonesia.

=== Empire Goblin ===
Empire Goblin was a 275 GRT tug which was built by Cochrane & Sons Ltd, Selby. Launched on 19 January 1942 and completed in June 1942. Sold in 1948 to Angel, Gardella Ltd, Argentina and renamed Bio Bio. On shipping registers until 1984.

=== Empire Gold ===
Empire Gold was an 8,028 GRT tanker which was built by Furness Shipbuilding Co Ltd, Haverton Hill-on-Tees. Launched on 4 October 1940 and completed in February 1941. Name Eppingdale allocated but the ship was not taken over by the Admiralty. Torpedoed on 18 April 1945 by U-1107 at 47°47′N 06°26′W while a member of Convoy HX 348. The ship caught fire and broke in two, both parts sank.

=== Empire Goodwin ===
Empire Goodwin was a 7,170 GRT cargo ship which was built by William Hamilton & Co Ltd, Port Glasgow. Launched on 6 August 1945 and completed in December 1945. Sold in 1947 to Denholm Line Steamers Ltd and renamed Garvelpark. Operated under the management of J & J Denholm Ltd. Sold in 1958 to Trans-Oceanic Steamship Co Ltd, Pakistan and renamed Ocean Ensign. Scrapped in January 1971 at Gadani Beach, Karachi.

=== Empire Governor ===
Empire Governor was an 8,657 GRT cargo ship which was built by Cantiere San Rocco SA, Trieste. Launched in 1925 as Esquilino for LLoyd Triestino, Trieste. Seized on 10 June 1940 at Aden. To MoWT and renamed Empire Governor. Scrapping commenced in 1946 at Dalmuir and was completed in Troon.

=== Empire Gower ===
Empire Gower was a 2,849 GRT collier which was built by William Gray & Co, West Hartlepool. Launched on 18 January 1946 and completed in March 1946. Sold in 1946 to Stephenson Clarke Ltd and renamed Rogate. Sold in 1964 to Aghia Barbara Compagnia Marittima, Panama and renamed Santa Barbara. Operated under the management of K & M Shipbrokers Ltd, London. Sold in 1969 to Naveprimo Compagnia Marittima, Panama. Operated under the management of P Vlastos, Greece. Scrapped in August 1972 at Perama, Greece.

=== Empire Grace ===
Empire Grace was a 13,478 GRT cargo liner which was built by Harland & Wolff Ltd, Belfast. Launched on 25 August 1941 and completed in April 1942. Sold in 1946 to Shaw, Savill & Albion Co Ltd, Glasgow. Ran aground on 14 August 1963 at Kanholmsfjärden. Refloated on 26 August but declared a constructive total loss. Arrived on 25 October 1963 at Faslane for scrapping.

=== Empire Grange ===
Empire Grange was a 6,981 GRT cargo ship which was built by Harland & Wolff Ltd, Belfast. Launched on 23 September 1942 and completed in March 1943. Sold in 1946 to King Line Ltd and renamed King Robert. Operated under the management of Dodd, Thompson & Co Ltd. Sold in 1961 to Mullion & Co Ltd, Hong Kong, and renamed Ardgem. Sold in 1967 to Kelso Shipping Co Ltd, Gibraltar and renamed Kelso. Operated under the management of Mullion & Co. Arrived on 2 September 1969 at Kaohsiung, Taiwan for scrapping.

=== Empire Granite (I) ===
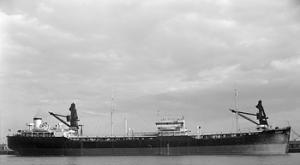
RFA Echodale

Empire Granite was an 8,150 GRT tanker which was built by R & W Hawthorn Leslie & Co Ltd, Newcastle upon Tyne. Launched on 29 November 1940 and completed in March 1941 as RFA Echodale. Arrived on 20 September 1961 at Spezia, Italy for scrapping.

=== Empire Granite (II) ===
Empire Granite was a 8,028 GRT tanker which was built by Furness Shipbuilding Ltd, Haverton-Hill-on-Tees. Launched on 12 December 1940 and completed in March 1941. Sold to Anglo-Saxon Petroleum Co. Ltd. in 1946 and renamed Kennerleya. Arrived at Spezia for breaking on 4 February 1960.

=== Empire Grassland ===
Empire Grassland was a 683 GRT hopper ship which was built by Fleming & Ferguson Ltd, Paisley. Launched on 16 May 1945 and completed in June 1945. To the Superintendent Civil Engineer, Bombay, then sold in 1946 to Melbourne Harbour Trust Commissioners, Melbourne, Australia. Foundered on 20 January 1947 after hopper doors broke off in heavy seas 70 nautical miles (130 km) north north west of Carnarvon, Western Australia while being towed from Singapore to Melbourne by Empire Downland.

=== Empire Grebe (I) ===
Empire Grebe was a 5,736 GRT cargo ship which was built by Northwest Steel Co, Portland, Oregon. Launched in December 1918 as West Wauna for the USSB. To MoWT in 1941 and renamed Empire Grebe. Sold in 1946 to Williamson & Co Ltd, Hong Kong, and renamed Inchmark. Ran aground on 29 May 1949 at Schilpad Island Reef, Banda Sea (7°05′S 132°03′E), a total loss.

=== Empire Grebe (II) ===
Empire Grebe was a 4,820 GRT LST which was built by Fairfield Shipbuilding & Engineering Co Ltd, Govan. Launched in July 1945 as LST 3038. Became HMS Fighter. To MoT in 1956 and renamed Empire Grebe. Operated under the management of Atlantic Steam Navigation Co Ltd. Management transferred to British India Steam Navigation Co Ltd in 1961. Scrapped in August 1968 in Singapore.

=== Empire Grenada ===
Empire Grenada was an 8,231 GRT tanker which was built by Harland & Wolff Ltd, Govan. Launched on 20 December 1945 as Empire Grenada and completed in April 1946 as British Piper for British Tanker Co Ltd. Arrived on 10 November 1961 at Newport, Monmouthshire for scrapping.

=== Empire Grenadier ===
Empire Grenadier was a 9,811 GRT tanker which was built by Furness Shipbuilding Co Ltd, Haverton Hill-on-Tees. Launched on 25 August 1942 and completed in October 1942. Sold in 1946 to Shell Company of Gibraltar Ltd and renamed Ficus. Arrived on 6 August 1960 at the Clyde anchorage for scrapping at Port Glasgow.

=== Empire Grenfell ===
Empire Grenfell was a 7,238 GRT cargo ship which was built by William Doxford & Sons Ltd, Sunderland. Launched on 30 June 1941 and completed in November 1941. To the Norwegian Government in 1942 and renamed King Sverre. Sold in 1946 to A/S P Kleppe, Norway, and renamed Martha Kleppe. Sold in 1959 to A/S Rona and renamed Reina. Operated under the management of T J Skogland A/S, Norway. Sold in 1960 to Compagnia Navigazione Overseas Transport SA and renamed Miami. Operated under the management of J W Elwell & Co, United States. Sold in 1965 to Tenodian Shipping Co Ltd, Liberia, and renamed Impala. Arrived on 1 May 1968 at Kaohsiung, Taiwan for scrapping.

=== Empire Greta ===
Empire Greta was a 292 GRT tug which was built by Cochrane & Sons Ltd, Selby. Launched on 12 June 1945 and completed in February 1942. Sold in 1947 to James Contracting & Shipping Co Ltd and renamed Foremost 105. Sold in 1949 to Cork Harbour Commissioners, Cork, Ireland. Disabled in November 1968 on a voyage from Cork to Penzance. Towed in by Dutch tug Groningen but later moved to Falmouth where the Admiralty Marshal arrested her on behalf of the salvor's owners. Sold in 1971 to Sapsin Property Company, Devon. Arrived on 12 March 1973 at Bilbao, Spain for scrapping.

=== Empire Grey ===
Empire Grey was a 6,140 GRT cargo ship which was built by John Readhead & Sons Ltd, South Shields. Launched on 9 March 1944 and completed in May 1944. Meldrum and Swinson Ltd., managers. 1946 - Management transferred to Eskdale Shipping Co., Ltd., Sold in 1947 to Zinal Steamship Co Ltd and renamed Burhill. Operated under the management of J Burness & Sons Ltd, London. Sold in 1951 to Golden Cross Line Ltd and renamed London City.Chartered by Bristol City Line. Sold later that year to Barberry's Steamship Co Ltd and renamed Chepman. Operated under the management of Runciman (London) Ltd. Sold in 1957 to Great Eastern Shipping Co Ltd, Bombay and renamed Jag Janani.1960 Sold to Abid and Co., for demolition. Scrapped in May 1961 in Bombay.

=== Empire Griffin ===
Empire Griffin was a 258 GRT tug which was built by Scott & Sons Ltd, Bowling, West Dunbartonshire. Launched on 22 April 1943 and completed in June 1943. Sold in 1947 to Condor Ltd, Glasgow, and renamed Fortunate. Sold in 1961 to Cory Hermanos SA, Tenerife. Reported to have been scrapped in 1974.

=== Empire Grosvenor ===
Empire Grosvenor was an 890 GRT coastal tanker which was built by A & J Inglis Ltd, Glasgow. Launched in October 1945 and completed in November 1945. Sold in 1947 to Anglo-Saxon Petroleum Co Ltd and renamed Frenulina. Lengthened in 1954, now 1,051 GRT. Laid up in 1962 in Singapore awaiting scrapping but sold to Teck Hwa Shipping Co, Panama, and renamed Anlok. Sold later that year to National Oil Co Ltd, Panama, and renamed Permina VI. Sold in 1974 to P T Bimoli, Indonesia and renamed Bimoli 01.

=== Empire Grove ===
Empire Grove was a 325 GRT coaster which was built by I Pimblott & Sons Ltd, Northwich. Launched on 5 June 1941 and completed in October 1941. Ran aground on 18 October 1941 at Long Peak, 2 nautical miles (3.7 km) south of Hartland Point, Devon. A constructive total loss.

=== Empire Guernsey ===
Empire Guernsey was a 288 GRT coastal tanker which was built by J Harker Ltd, Knottingley. Launched on 21 October 1944 and completed in March 1945. Sold in 1947 to British Controlled Oilfields Ltd, Ecuador and renamed Beacon. Sold in 1957 to Transpetroleo Compania Anonima, Ecuador, and renamed Billie. Sold in 1980 to Transnacoop, Ecuador, and reported to have been disposed of by scuttling in 1981.

=== Empire Guidon ===
Empire Guidon was a 7,041 GRT cargo ship which was built by Furness Shipbuilding Co Ltd, Haverton Hill-on-Tees. Launched on 30 May 1942 and completed in August 1942. Torpedoed on 31 October 1942 and sunk by U-504 at 30°10′S 33°50′E.

=== Empire Guillemot (I) ===
Empire Guillemot was a 5,641 GRT cargo ship which was built by Western Pipe & Steel Co, San Francisco. Launched in 1919 as West Caddoa for the USSB. To MoS in 1940 and renamed Empire Guillemot. Torpedoed on 24 October 1941 and sunk by an Italian aircraft west of the island of La Galite, north west of Bizerta, Tunisia.

=== Empire Guillemot (II) ===
Empire Guillemot was a 4,820 GRT LST which was built by Harland & Wolff Ltd, Belfast. Launched in July 1945 as LST 3523 and later became HMS Walcheren. To MoT in 1956 and renamed Empire Guillemot. Laid up in Singapore and scrapped there in July 1968.

=== Empire Guinevere ===
Empire Guinevere was a 7,085 GRT cargo ship which was built by William Denny & Bros Ltd, Dumbarton. Launched on 14 May 1942 and completed in June 1942. Sold in 1947 to Cardigan Shipping Co Ltd and renamed Grelrosa. Operated under the management of W T Gould & Co Ltd, Cardiff. Sold in 1960 to Kam Kee Navigation Co Ltd, and renamed Shun Tai. Operated under the management of Jebshun & Co Ltd, Hong Kong. Sold in 1968 to Chan Moo Chu and reflagged to Somalia, still under Jebshun's management. Collided on 11 March 1969 with SS World Carrier 3 nautical miles (5.6 km) south of Singapore (01°12′N 103°51′E) and sank.

=== Empire Gulf ===
Empire Gulf was a 6,401 GRT tanker which was built by Short Bros Ltd, Sunderland. Launched in 1927 as Laristan for Common Bros Ltd. On 15 January 1942 became stranded on Tiree. Salvaged and then repaired. To MoWT in 1943 and renamed Empire Gulf. To Common Bros Ltd in 1946 and renamed Laristan. Sold in 1949 to John I Jacobs & Co Ltd and renamed Cherrywood. Sold in 1953 to Marcou & Sons, London and renamed Irene M. Reflagged to Costa Rica. Sold in 1954 to Muzaffer Emin Zorlu, Turkey and renamed Semira. Scrapped in November 1960 at Kalafatyeri, Turkey.

=== Empire Gull (I) ===
Empire Gull was a 6,458 GRT cargo ship which was built by Skinner & Eddy Corp, Seattle. Launched in 1919 as Brave Coeur for the USSB. To MoWT in 1941 and renamed Empire Gull. Torpedoed on 12 December 1942 and sunk by U-177 in the Mozambique Channel.

=== Empire Gull (II) ===
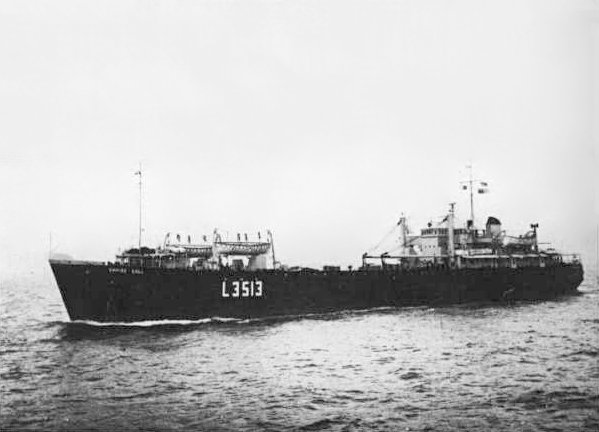
Empire Gull

Empire Gull was a 4,820 GRT LST which was built by Davie Shipbuilding & Repairing Co Ltd, Lauzon, Quebec. Launched in October 1945 as LST 3523 and commissioned as HMS Trouncer in 1947. To MoT in 1956 and renamed Empire Gull. Scrapped in 1968 in Singapore.

=== Empire Gulliver ===
Empire Gulliver was a 2,905 GRT cargo ship which was built by William Gray & Co, West Hartlepool, Launched on 8 June 1943, and completed in September 1943. Sold in 1946 to J & C Harrison Ltd, London, and renamed Bharatkhand. Sold in 1954 to Bharat Line Ltd, India. Scrapped in September 1962 in Bombay.

=== Empire Gunfleet ===
Empire Gunfleet was a 7,387 GRT cargo ship which was built by John Readhead & Sons Ltd, South Shields. Launched in April 1945 and completed in June 1945. Sold in 1946 to Clan Lin Steamers Ltd and renamed Clan Mackay. Sold in 1962 to Compagnia de Navigazione Victoria Neptuno Sa, Panama and renamed Babylon. Operated under the management of The Hu Steamship Co Ltd, Taiwan. Arrived on 25 September 1966 at Hong Kong for scrapping.

=== Empire Gunner ===
Empire Gunner was a 4,492 GRT cargo ship which was built by Grangemouth & Greenock Dockyard Co, Greenock. Launched in 1906 as Strathearn. Sold in 1924 to P C Lemos, Greece, and renamed Constantinos. Renamed Konstantis Lemos in 1925. To Constantine & Lemos, Greece in 1928 and renamed Danos. Sold in 1939 to Societa di Navigazione Polena, Genoa and renamed Moscardin. Captured on 10 June 1940 off Newcastle upon Tyne. To MoWT and renamed Empire Gunner. Bombed on 7 September 1941 and sunk by German aircraft in St George's Channel (52°08′N 05°18′W).

=== Empire Gypsy ===
Empire Gypsy was an 813 GRT coastal tanker which was built by A & J Inglis, Glasgow. Launched on 31 August 1942 and completed in November 1942. Sold in 1948 to the Indian Navy and became INS Sambhar. Removed from the list of Indian Navy vessels in 1976.

== See also ==
The above entries give a precis of each ship's history. For a fuller account see the linked articles.

== Sources ==
- Mitchell, WH; Sawyer, LA (1990). The Empire Ships (Second ed.). London, New York, Hamburg, Hong Kong: Lloyd's of London Press. ISBN 1-85044-275-4.
