= SS Venore =

American freighter and ore carrier (1921-1942)

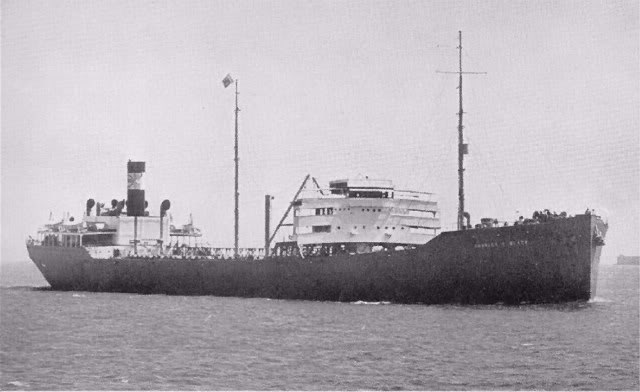
- Venore as Charles G. Black in 1926

History

United States
- Name: G. Harrison Smith (1921–1926); Charles G. Black (1926–1940); Venore (1940–1942)
- Namesake: G. Harrison Smith; Charles G. Black
- Owner: Standard Oil Co. of New Jersey (1921–1940); Ore Steamship Corporation (1940–1942)
- Operator: International Petroleum Company (1921–1926); Standard Oil Co. of New Jersey (1926–1940); Ore Steamship Corporation (1940–1942)
- Route: Cruz Grand, Chile-Baltimore, Maryland
- Builder: Bethlehem Shipbuilding Corporation
- Yard number: 4210
- Launched: July 12, 1921
- Acquired: September 12, 1921
- Renamed: 1926 (to Charles G. Black); 1940 (to Venore)
- Reclassified: 1940 (as an ore carrier)
- Home port: New York City, New York
- Identification: Official number: 1141674
- Fate: Sunk on January 24, 1942

General characteristics
- Type: Freighter (1926–1940); Ore carrier (1940–1942)
- Tonnage: 8,017 GRT; 20,000 DWT
- Length: 571.5 ft (174.2 m)
- Beam: 72 ft (22 m)
- Draft: Howden-type
- Depth: 44 ft (13 m)
- Installed power: 1 × triple-expansion reciprocating steam engine; 3 × single-ended Scotch boilers
- Propulsion: 2 screw
- Speed: 10 knots (19 km/h; 12 mph)
- Crew: 42

SS Venore was an American freighter and ore carrier. She was originally built in 1921 under the name G. Harrison Smith, and was renamed to Charles G. Black after being acquired by the Standard Oil Company of New Jersey in 1926. She was torpedoed and sunk by the German submarine U-66 on January 23, 1942.

== Construction ==
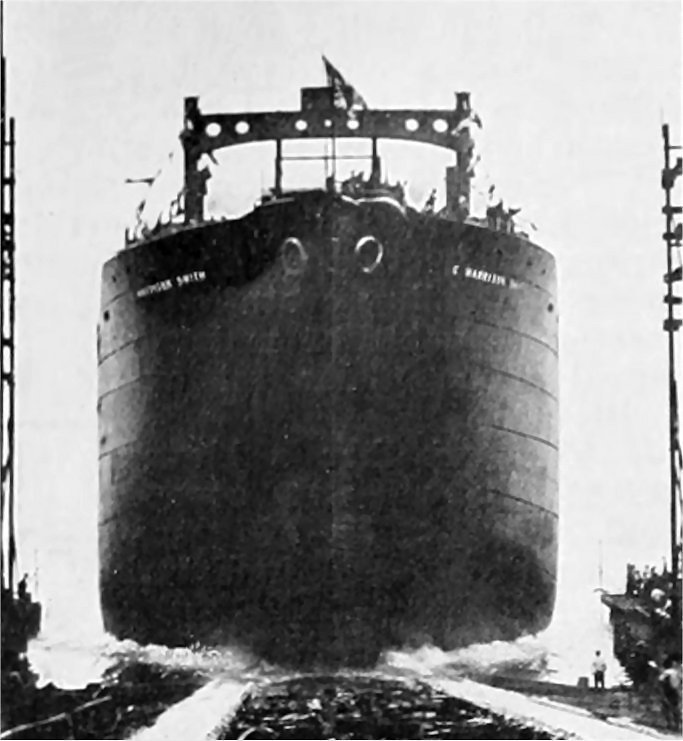
G. Harrison Smith being launched on July 12, 1921

G. Harrison Smith was constructed at the Bethlehem Shipbuilding Corporation's plant in Sparrow's Point, Maryland, and she was laid down in early 1921. She was one of four ships of her type built at the plant, though the other three were built for the Ore Steamship Corporation rather than the International Petroleum Company, which operated G. Harrison Smith. The freighter was launched on July 12, 1921 as yard number 4210. She underwent her sea trials on August 30 and was delivered to the International Petroleum Company on September 12. She was assigned the official number 1141674.

=== Specifications ===
G. Harrison Smith was 571.5 feet (174.2 m) long, 72 feet (22 m) wide, and 44 feet (13 m) deep. Her tonnage was 8,017 gross registered and 20,000 deadweight. Her ore hold was 360 feet (110 m) long and 30 feet (9.1 m) wide. She had a top speed of 10 knots (19 km/h; 12 mph). She was equipped with three single-ended Scotch boilers that utilized the Bethlehem-Dahl mechanical oil burning system. G. Harrison Smith's triple-expansion reciprocating steam engine had cylinders 25 in × 41 in × 68 in (64 cm × 104 cm × 173 cm) in diameter and had the Howden-type forced draft.

== Service history ==
G. Harrison Smith was operated by the International Petroleum Company between 1921 and 1926. She was acquired by the International Petroleum Company's parent—the Standard Oil Company of New Jersey—in 1926, and was renamed to Charles G. Black. She was sold to the Ore Steamship Corporation of New York on September 26, 1940, where she was subsequently converted to an ore carrier and renamed Venore.

The ship's regular route consisted of traveling from Cruz Grande, Chile, to Baltimore, Maryland, via the Panama Canal. She could carry a maximum of 140,000 barrels (22,000 m^{3}) of oil if all of her holds were filled with the cargo.

On January 6, 1927, Charles G. Black ran aground off the South Pass Light in Louisiana. She was refloated on January 11, five days later.

== Sinking ==
Venore departed Cruz Grande, on January 4, 1942, laden with 8,000 tons of iron ore and crewed by 42 officers and crew. She briefly docked in Cristobal, Panama, for refueling, passing through the Panama Canal a week after she departed Chile. Before continuing on her voyage to Baltimore, the ship's mess boy and second cook were informed of four tankers sunk off Cape Hatteras by German U-boats.

During the night of January 23, Venore was passed by the British motor tanker Empire Gem, sailing back to England with kerosene for the war effort. Venore's captain, Fritz Duurloo, ordered the ore carrier to be darkened save for her sidelights, which were only to be dimmed. Her radio operator was also informed of a U-boat operating 60 miles (97 km) east of Wimble Shoals, though he told no one of this.

The German submarine U-66 fired two torpedoes which struck Empire Gem at 19:25, causing fire to erupt from her stern, and Venore's third mate was startled by Empire Gem's "terrific explosion". He subsequently went to the bridge, informing Captain Duurloo of the incident. U-66 surfaced while it rounded Empire Gem's stern, chasing Venore for around five minutes. Captain Duurloo ordered the ship to move at full speed towards the shoals. The explosions caused by Empire Gem frightened Venore's crew, and three boats were dropped from the deck while the ore freighter was still underway at her maximum speed. Two of them were destroyed by her propellers, but one managed to get away with two men aboard. Her radio operator sent out an emergency signal that read "SS Venore torpedoed off Diamond Shoals", which was received by the radio operator of the American merchant ship E.M. Clark.

U-66 fired two more of its torpedoes at Venore. One missed, however, the other struck amidships of the boiler room, setting the ore carrier's stern on fire. The crew in the engine and boiler rooms abandoned their posts after stopping the engines. Around an hour after the first torpedo struck Venore, a third torpedo struck the #9 ballast tank on the port side, causing the ship to list sharply and submerging the main deck.

Venore capsized; photographed in the morning of January 24, 1942

The third mate took the radio operator to the last lifeboat, only to find it had already been lowered with the remaining crew aboard it by the order of the chief mate. The lifeboat floated next to the davits, and the two men aboard leapt from the deck of Venore towards the lifeboat. The chief mate initially gave the order to row away before realizing neither man, nor the captain, was aboard. The ore freighter listed heavily to port by now, and the lifeboat gave up any attempt to return due to the conditions of the sea. Venore capsized at 4:05.

The 21 men in the lifeboat rowed all night and eventually raised a sail after dawn. An aircraft passed by shortly after but did not spot them, and they met up with the other remaining lifeboat around 10:00. It was swamped, and the chief mate ordered the sail to be taken down in order to recover them. However, the sea was too strong, and they were "left astern" around 10:45. In the morning of January 25 a ship was spotted on the horizon, which turned out to be the tanker Tennessee. The crew in the lifeboat were rescued 62 miles (100 km) north of Diamond Shoals, and were subsequently taken to Norfolk. One survivor was plucked from debris by the motor tanker Australia later that day.

=== Wreck ===
While a shipwreck site has been located in the region where Venore went down, the National Oceanic and Atmospheric Administration (NOAA) has not definitely located the wreck of the ore carrier.
