= SS Rodopi =

History
- Name: Setubal (1944–45); Empire Gavel (1945); Rodopi (1945–74)
- Owner: Oldenburg Portugiesische Dampschiffs Rhederei (1944-45); Ministry of War Transport (1945–46); Greek Government (1946–49); Hellenic Lines (1949–74)
- Operator: Oldenburg Portugiesische Dampschiffs Rhederei (1945); John Bruce & Co. Ltd (1945–46); Greek Government (1946–49); Hellenic Lines (1949–74)
- Port of registry: (Nazi Germany) Hamburg, Germany (1945); London, United Kingdom (1945–46); Piraeus, Greece (1946–74)
- Builder: Lübecker Flenderwerke AG
- Yard number: 404
- Launched: 1944
- Completed: January 1945
- Out of service: 1974
- Identification: United Kingdom Official Number 180646 (1945–46); Code Letters GJLZ (1945–46); Lloyd's Register Number 5298444 ( –1974)
- Fate: Scrapped

General characteristics
- Class & type: Hansa A type Cargo ship
- Tonnage: 1,923 GRT; 935 NRT; 3,400 DWT
- Length: 85.22 m (279 ft 7 in)
- Beam: 13.49 m (44 ft 3 in)
- Draught: 2.62 m (8 ft 7 in)
- Depth: 4.78 m (15 ft 8 in)
- Installed power: Compound steam engine, 1,200IHP
- Propulsion: Single screw propeller
- Speed: 10.5 knots (19.4 km/h)

Rodopi was a Hansa A Type cargo ship which was built as Setubal in 1944 by Lübecker Flenderwerke AG, Lübeck, Germany for Oldenburg Portugiesische Dampschiffs Rhederei, Hamburg . She was seized as a prize of war in 1945, passing to the Ministry of War Transport and renamed Empire Gavel. She was allocated to Greece in 1945 and was renamed Rodopi. She was sold to Hellenic Lines in 1949. She was scrapped in 1974.

== Description ==
The ship was 85.22 m (279 ft 7 in) long, with a beam of 13.49 m (44 ft 3 in). She had a depth of 4.78 m (15 ft 8 in), and a draught of 2.62 m (8 ft 7 in). She was assessed as 1,925 GRT, 935 NRT, 3,400 DWT.

The ship was propelled by a compound steam engine, which had two cylinders of 42 cm (16 9/16 in) and two cylinders of 90 cm (35 7/16 in) diameter by 90 cm (35 7/16 in) inches stroke. The engine was built by Rheinmetall-Börsig AG, Görlitz. Rated at 1,200IHP, it drove a single screw propeller and could propel the ship at 10.5 knots (19.4 km/h).

== History ==
Setubal was a Hansa A Type cargo ship built in 1944 as yard number 404 by Lübecker Flenderwerke AG, Lübeck, Germany for Oldenburg Portugiesische Dampschiffs Rhederei, Hamburg. She was completed in January 1945. Her port of registry was Hamburg.

In May 1945, Setubal was seized as a prize of war at Lübeck,. She was passed to the Ministry of War Transport and was renamed Empire Gavel. The Code Letters GJLZ and United Kingdom Official Number 180646 were allocated. Her port of registry was London and she was operated under the management of John Bruce & Co. Ltd, Leith.

In 1947, Empire Gavel was allocated to Greece. The Greek government sold her in 1949 to Hellenic Lines and was renamed Rodopi. She was one of two ex-German ships allocated to Hellenic Lines out of the five that they applied for - the other ship was the Vorios Hellas, Her port of registry was Piraeus. With their introduction in the 1960s, Rodopi was allocated the Lloyd's Register Number 5298444. She arrived at Gemlik, Turkey on 5 March 1974 for scrapping by Centas Celik, and was scrapped in April.
