= German submarine U-66 (1940) =

German World War II submarine

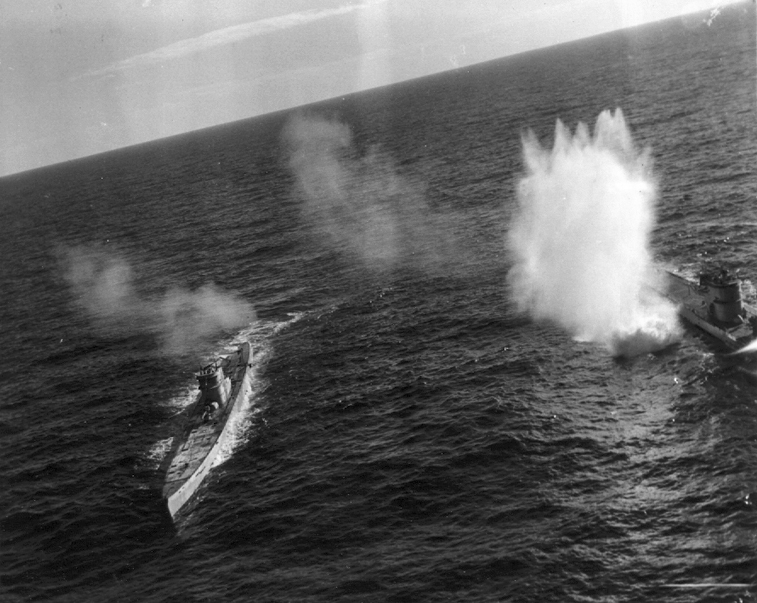
- U-66 (left) and U-117 under attack by aircraft from USS Card on 7 August 1943

History

Nazi Germany
- Name: U-66
- Ordered: 7 August 1939
- Builder: AG Weser, Bremen
- Yard number: 985
- Laid down: 20 March 1940
- Launched: 10 October 1940
- Commissioned: 2 January 1941
- Fate: Sunk 6 May 1944

General characteristics
- Class & type: Type IXC U-boat
- Displacement: 1,120 t (1,100 long tons) surfaced; 1,232 t (1,213 long tons) submerged
- Length: 76.76 m (251 ft 10 in) o/a; 58.75 m (192 ft 9 in) pressure hull
- Beam: 6.76 m (22 ft 2 in) o/a; 4.40 m (14 ft 5 in) pressure hull
- Height: 9.60 m (31 ft 6 in)
- Draught: 4.70 m (15 ft 5 in)
- Installed power: 4,400 PS (3,200 kW; 4,300 bhp) (diesels); 1,000 PS (740 kW; 990 shp) (electric)
- Propulsion: 2 shafts; 2 × diesel engines; 2 × electric motors
- Speed: 18.3 kn (33.9 km/h; 21.1 mph) surfaced; 7.3 knots (13.5 km/h; 8.4 mph) submerged
- Range: 13,450 nmi (24,910 km; 15,480 mi) at 10 knots (19 km/h; 12 mph) surfaced; 63 nmi (117 km; 72 mi) at 4 knots (7.4 km/h; 4.6 mph) submerged
- Complement: 4 officers, 44 enlisted
- Armament: 6 × torpedo tubes (4 bow, 2 stern); 22 × 53.3 cm (21 in) torpedoes; 1 × 10.5 cm (4.1 in) SK C/32 deck gun (180 rounds); 1 × 3.7 cm (1.5 in) SK C/30 AA gun; 1 × 2 cm FlaK 30 AA guns

Service record
- Part of: 2nd U-boat Flotilla; 2 January 1941 – 6 May 1944
- Identification codes: M 21 181
- Commanders: Kptlt. / K.Kapt. Richard Zapp; 2 January 1941 – 21 June 1942; Kptlt. Friedrich Markworth; 22 June 1942 – 1 September 1943; Oblt.z.S.d.R. Paul Ferks; 6 August – 1 September 1943; Oblt.z.S. Gerhard Seehausen; 2 September 1943 – 6 May 1944
- Operations: 9 patrols: 1st patrol: 13 May – 11 June 1941; 2nd patrol: 23 June – 5 August 1941; 3rd patrol: 28 August – 9 November 1941; 4th patrol: 25 December 1941 – 10 February 1942; 5th patrol: 21 March – 27 May 1942; 6th patrol: 23 June – 29 September 1942; 7th patrol (aborted): 9 – 11 Nov 1942; 7th patrol (official): 6 January – 24 March 1943; 8th patrol: 27 April – 1 September 1943; 9th patrol: 16 January – 6 May 1944
- Victories: 33 merchant ships sunk (200,021 GRT); 2 merchant ships damaged (22,674 GRT); 2 warships damaged (64 tons)

German submarine U-66 was a Type IXC U-boat of Nazi Germany's Kriegsmarine during World War II. The submarine was laid down on 20 March 1940 at the AG Weser yard at Bremen, launched on 10 October and commissioned on 2 January 1941 under the command of Kapitänleutnant Richard Zapp as part of the 2nd U-boat Flotilla.

== Design ==
German Type IXC submarines were slightly larger than the original Type IXBs. U-66 had a displacement of 1,120 tonnes (1,100 long tons) when at the surface and 1,232 tonnes (1,213 long tons) while submerged. The U-boat had a total length of 76.76 m (251 ft 10 in), a pressure hull length of 58.75 m (192 ft 9 in), a beam of 6.76 m (22 ft 2 in), a height of 9.60 m (31 ft 6 in), and a draught of 4.70 m (15 ft 5 in). The submarine was powered by two MAN M 9 V 40/46 supercharged four-stroke, nine-cylinder diesel engines producing a total of 4,400 metric horsepower (3,240 kW; 4,340 shp) for use while surfaced, two Siemens-Schuckert 2 GU 345/34 double-acting electric motors producing a total of 1,000 metric horsepower (740 kW; 990 shp) for use while submerged. She had two shafts and two 1.92 m (6 ft) propellers. The boat was capable of operating at depths of up to 230 metres (750 ft).

The submarine had a maximum surface speed of 18.3 knots (33.9 km/h; 21.1 mph) and a maximum submerged speed of 7.3 knots (13.5 km/h; 8.4 mph). When submerged, the boat could operate for 63 nautical miles (117 km; 72 mi) at 4 knots (7.4 km/h; 4.6 mph); when surfaced, she could travel 13,450 nautical miles (24,910 km; 15,480 mi) at 10 knots (19 km/h; 12 mph). U-66 was fitted with six 53.3 cm (21 in) torpedo tubes (four fitted at the bow and two at the stern), 22 torpedoes, one 10.5 cm (4.13 in) SK C/32 naval gun, 180 rounds, and a 3.7 cm (1.5 in) SK C/30 as well as a 2 cm (0.79 in) C/30 anti-aircraft gun. The boat had a complement of forty-eight.

== Service history ==
After her transfer from a training organization to front line service in May 1941, until her sinking in May 1944, U-66 conducted nine combat patrols, sinking 33 merchant ships, for a total of 200,021 gross register tons (GRT), and damaged two British motor torpedo boats. She was a member of four wolfpacks.

U-66 was the seventh most successful U-boat in World War II.

On 6 May 1944, during her ninth patrol, she was sunk west of the Cape Verde Islands by depth charges, ramming and gunfire from Grumman TBF Avenger and Grumman F4F Wildcat aircraft of the US escort carrier Block Island and by the destroyer escort USS Buckley.

== Patrols ==
=== First ===
On 13 May 1941, U-66 departed her homeport of Kiel under the command of Richard Zapp, a future Knight's Cross recipient, on her first patrol. After about 10 days she rounded the northern coast of Britain and made her way into the mid-Atlantic Ocean. After another 20 days, U-66 headed for her new base at Lorient, on the French Atlantic coast where the U-boat was based for the rest of her career.

=== Second ===
After refitting and refueling, U-66 set off to the Cape Verde islands. Following an uneventful six-day voyage, she came upon convoy SL-78, a convoy designated to give supplies to Allied African countries. The convoy had been attacked just recently by German submarine U-123 (1940) and German submarine U-69 (1940), one of which (U-123) was in her flotilla. U-66 sank George J. Goulandris and Kalypso Vergotti, two Greek merchantmen of 4,345 and 5,686 GRT, respectively, west of the Canary Islands. She extended her tonnage sunk with the torpedoing of Saint Anselm on the next day, which was a British steam merchant ship of 5,614 GRT. More than two weeks later, she sank Holmside, a 3,433 GRT straggler from the convoy OG-67 northeast of the Cape Verde Islands. The remainder of the patrol was unsuccessful; she returned to Lorient in about a month.

=== Third ===
On 28 August, U-66 left Lorient for north-eastern South America. The patrol was mostly uneventful, but the boat found the Panamanian steam tanker I.C. White (7,052 GRT), off the eastern coast of Brazil on 24 September. After a two-day chase, U-66 hit the tanker with one torpedo. U-66 continued the remainder of the patrol without any further incident and returned to Lorient on 9 November.

=== Fourth ===
U-66's fourth sortie was part of Operation Drumbeat, a German attempt to hinder American convoys off the east coast of the United States. U-66, leaving on 25 December 1941 and in compliance with orders, positioned herself off Cape Hatteras on 15 January 1942 and started to hunt for a target. She found the 6,635 GRT American steam tanker Allan Jackson three days later and sank her with two torpedoes 60 nmi (110 km; 69 mi) north-east of Diamond Shoals, North Carolina. The next day she sank a 7,988 GRT Canadian passenger liner, RMS Lady Hawkins, with two stern-launched torpedoes, killing 246 passengers and crew. Another five died in a lifeboat before 71 survivors were rescued five days later by USAT Coamo. Three days later with two stern-launched torpedoes she hit Olympic, a 5,335 GRT Panamanian steam tanker which broke in two after one minute. Two days after that, Empire Gem and Venore (an 8,139 GRT British motor tanker and an 8,017 GRT American steam merchant ship, the latter following the former), were both sunk by U-66. Empire Gem was hit amidships and aft by two torpedoes, while Venore, 20 miles behind, had only one torpedo hit that set her boilers on fire. U-66 then continued eastward back to Lorient, where she arrived on 10 February.

=== Fifth ===
On 21 March, U-66 left for what proved to be her most successful patrol, resulting in 43,956 gross tons sunk and 12,502 gross tons damaged in the Caribbean Sea. 24 days after departure she sank Korthion, a 2,116 GRT Greek steam merchantman just south of Barbados with one torpedo hit amidships. Two days later, the boat sank Amsterdam, a 7,329 GRT Dutch steam tanker, which split in two after being hit by two torpedoes, one amidships, and one in the engine room. Most of the survivors were picked up near Port of Spain, (Trinidad) by Ivan, a Yugoslavian steam merchant vessel. The next day U-66 attacked Heinrich von Riedemann, an 11,020 GRT Panamanian motor tanker. The first torpedo severely damaged the steering control of her port engine and ruptured a tank of oil, making much of it leak out. 20 minutes after the first hit, just after the starboard engine was stopped, the ship was abandoned when the crew took to the lifeboats. An hour later U-66 hit her with a second torpedo, setting her afire. It extinguished itself within 25 minutes. 50 minutes later the submarine hit her with a third torpedo, which set the ship afire again. She remained that way for about 70 minutes before she finally sank. Nine days later U-66 sank the 5,513 GRT US Alcoa Partner with a torpedo and a shot from her deck gun.

=== Sixth ===
After her fifth patrol, Richard Zapp left U-66 to take command of the 3rd U-boat Flotilla. This meant that Kapitänleutnant Friedrich Markworth was in charge. The submarine started her sixth patrol with the sinking of Triglav, a 6,396 GRT Yugoslavian steamer, after depositing a sick crew-member in Spain. After a couple of weeks, U-66 ran across the 4,942 GRT Brazilian merchant ship Tamandaré, sinking her with a torpedo hit in her stern. The survivors were picked up by the USS PC-492. Two days after the attack on Tamandaré, U-66 sank Weirbank, a 5,150 GRT British merchantman on 28 July 1942, with the second of two torpedoes launched at her. Four days after her previous sinking, two mines from U-66 severely damaged two British motor torpedo boats that had left on a patrol from Port Castries, St. Lucia. Those two mines had been laid, along with four others, on 20 July. U-66 subsequently sank the 766 GRT Polish Rozewie on 6 August and the American 5,356 GRT Topa Topa on the 29th. The next day she sank both the 6,049 GRT Panamanian Sir Huon and the 5,637 GRT American West Lashaway in separate attacks. A raft with survivors from West Lashaway was sighted by three aircraft on 18 September; HMS Vimy, one of the escorts of a small convoy went to investigate. Deciding that the raft could be a disguised U-boat, Vimy opened fire, luckily with no result. The raft's sail was hastily cut down, upon which the British destroyer rescued 17 people.

U-66 also sank the 8,621 GRT Winamac on 31 August and the Swedish 6,390 GRT Peiping on 9 September. She returned to Lorient on 29 September.

=== Seventh (aborted) ===
On 9 November 1942, U-66 left Lorient on what should have been her seventh war patrol. Soon after departure, leaks were encountered, and she decided to return. On 10 November, the day before she returned, a British Wellington bomber, equipped with a Leigh Light, spotted her and dropped four depth charges. The U-boat escaped without serious damage.

=== Seventh ===
U-66 left Lorient on 6 January 1943 for what was officially her seventh patrol. On 20 January, the ship landed an espionage agent on the coast of Mauritania, but the agent and two crewmen were immediately captured. Her first sinking came with the attack on the 113 GRT French Joseph Elise on 1 February. On the 27th, U-66 attacked the 4,312 GRT British coal merchant ship St. Margaret in mid-Atlantic near Bermuda, sinking her with one torpedo and, after several misses, a shell. Several survivors were captured and taken to the prison camp Marlag und Milag Nord. U-66 then returned to port, arriving on 24 March 1943.

=== Eighth ===
U-66's eighth patrol started after a quick refit on 7 April 1943 when she left Lorient. At 148 days, it was to be her longest. She first sank the 10,173 GRT American Esso Gettysburg, which was carrying crude oil, on 10 June after unsuccessfully attempting to attack several other American tankers. On 2 July, she successfully sank the 10,195 GRT Bloody Marsh (this ship was on her maiden voyage), with a torpedo. The last ship encountered on the patrol was the 10,172 GRT Cherry Valley, also American, which she sank on 22 July. U-66 then returned to Lorient.

U-66 was attacked by aircraft on 3 August and was in need of medical assistance. U-117, sent to rendez-vous on the request of the Kriegsmarine commanders, reached U-66 on 6 August and transferred her ship's doctor and other essentials to U-66. Both ships were later attacked by planes during refuelling of U-66, and the supply ship sank.

=== Ninth ===
On 16 January 1944, U-66 left Lorient for what would be her last patrol and the last command of Oberleutnant zur See Gerhard Seehausen (posthumously promoted to Kapitänleutnant). A month and ten days after departure, U-66 sighted Silvermaple, a 5,313 GRT British motor merchant in the convoy ST-12. She was sunk after one torpedo hit. Four days later, the boat came upon the French 5,202 GRT St. Louis, which she sank with two torpedoes off Accra, Ghana. The ship broke into three parts, which sank in less than 50 seconds. Four days after the sinking of St. Louis, on 5 March 1944 U-66 sank the 4,964 GRT British John Holt with two torpedoes, and took the Captain, Master Cecil Gordon Hime MN, and a passenger, Mr Elliott - an agent of the Holt Shipping Company, as prisoners of war (POW). These men were later lost with the U-boat. Nearly three weeks after the sinking of John Holt, the U-boat came across the 4,257 GRT British Matadian, which she torpedoed and sank. After the attack, U-66 was forced to bottom out in the mud as British patrol craft engaged her. U-66 was supposed to be resupplied by U-488, but this boat, a Milchkuh supply submarine, was sunk on 26 April.

==== Sinking ====
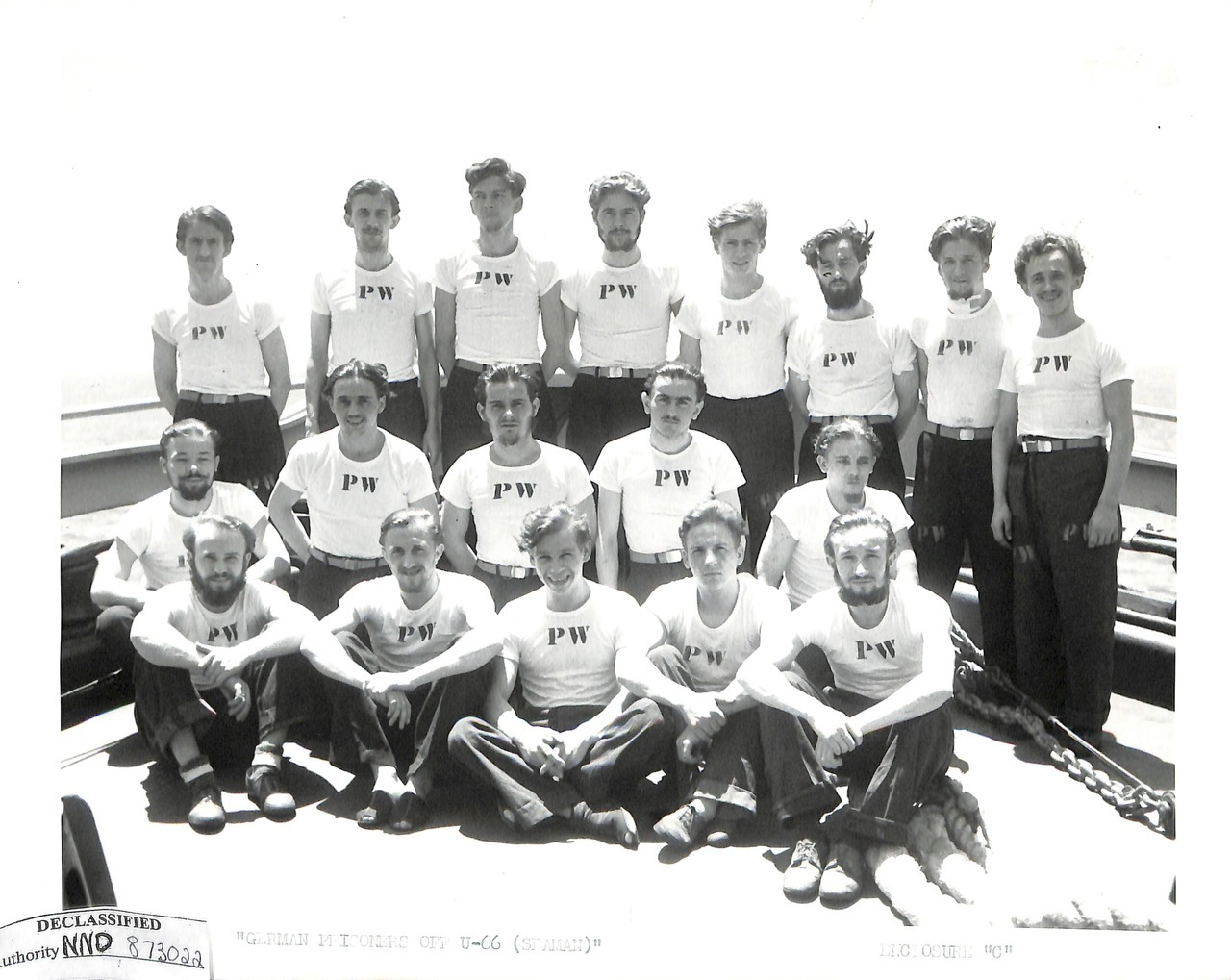
Survivors from U-66 aboard USS Block Island, 6 May 1944

On 1 May 1944, U-66 came under attack by American ships from an antisubmarine hunter-killer group formed around USS Block Island. Three Fido homing torpedoes were dropped near the boat, and numerous aircraft from Block Island, along with smaller craft, were designated to hunt for her. On the morning of 6 May, the destroyer escort USS Buckley found the submarine. After an exchange of gunfire and torpedoes, Buckley, under the command of Lieutenant Commander Brent Abel, rammed the submarine.

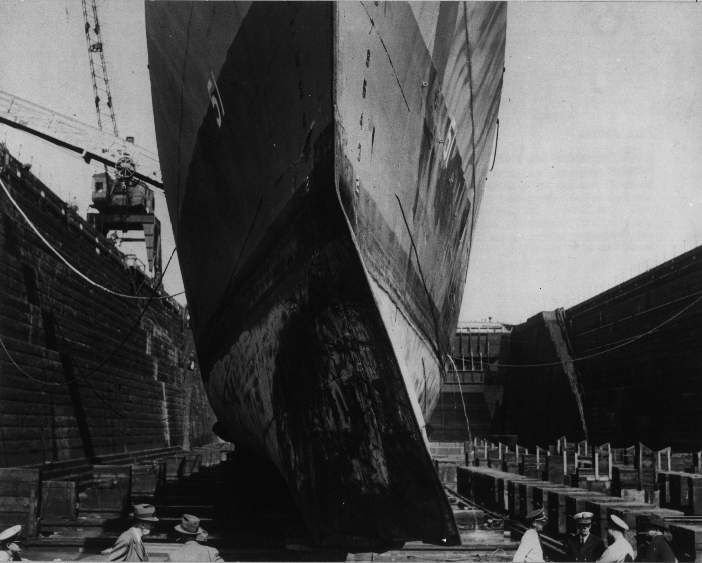
The bow of the USS Buckley after the ramming of U-66

With the two vessels stuck fast, a party of Germans, under the command of U-66's first officer, Klaus Herbig, attempted to climb onto the American escort's forecastle to create a diversion while Seehausen and the remainder of the U-boat's crew worked to free the boat. As American sailors saw the boarding party climbing on deck, hand-to-hand fighting broke out in which a number of Germans were killed or wounded before the U-boat was able to make good her escape. Five armed Germans remained on deck of the destroyer but they were quickly overpowered and taken prisoner. Buckley's 3-inch gun was unleashed on the U-boat as the Americans chased after her, but U-66 then turned and rammed Buckley near her engine room, damaging the ship's starboard screw. Soon afterward, U-66 was scuttled on Seehausen's orders to prevent her secret equipment from being captured. Buckley then began rescue operations, which lasted three hours.

U-66 was lost at position 17°17′N 32°29′W with 24 dead and 36 survivors, all of whom were captured by Buckley. Seehausen was not among the survivors, who were later transferred to Block Island. For his act of ramming U-66, Brent Abel received the Navy Cross.

=== Wolfpacks ===
U-66 took part in four wolfpacks, namely:

- West (24 May – 5 June 1941)
- Rochen (27 January – 1 March 1943)
- Tümmler (1 – 17 March 1943)
- Aufnahme (5 – 10 May 1943)

== Summary of raiding history ==
Date	Ship	Nationality	Tonnage (Note: Merchant ship tonnages are in gross register tons. Military vessels are listed by tons displacement.)	Fate
29 June 1941	George J. Goulandris	Greece	4,345	Sunk
29 June 1941	Kalypso Vergotti	Greece	5,686	Sunk
30 June 1941	Saint Aslem	United Kingdom	5,614	Sunk
19 July 1941	Holmside	United Kingdom	3,433	Sunk
26 July 1941	I. C. White	Panama	7,052	Sunk
18 January 1942	Allan Jackson	United States	6,635	Sunk
19 January 1942	RMS Lady Hawkins	Royal Canadian Navy	7,988	Sunk
22 January 1942	Olympic	Panama	5,335	Sunk
24 January 1942	Empire Gem	United Kingdom	8,139	Sunk
24 January 1942	Venore	United States	8,017	Sunk
14 April 1942	Korthion	Greece	2,116	Sunk
16 April 1942	Amsterdam	Netherlands	7,329	Sunk
17 April 1942	Heinrich von Riedemann	Panama	11,020	Sunk
26 April 1942	Alcoa Partner	United States	5,513	Sunk
29 April 1942	Harry G. Siedel	Panama	10,354	Sunk
2 May 1942	Sandar	Norway	7,624	Sunk
3 May 1942	Geo. W. McNight	United Kingdom	12,502	Damaged
9 July 1942	Triglav	Yugoslavia	6,363	Sunk
26 July 1942	Tamandaré	Brazil	4,942	Sunk
28 July 1942	Weirbank	United Kingdom	5,150	Sunk
2 August 1942	HMS MTB-339	Royal Navy	32	Damaged
2 August 1942	HMS MTB-342	Royal Navy	32	Damaged
6 August 1942	Rozewie	Poland	766	Sunk
29 August 1942	Topa Topa	United States	5,356	Sunk
30 August 1942	Sir Huon	Panama	6,049	Sunk
30 August 1942	West Lashaway	United States	5,637	Sunk
31 August 1942	Winamac	United Kingdom	8,621	Sunk
9 September 1942	Peiping	Sweden	6,390	Sunk
1 February 1943	Joseph Elise	Free France	113	Sunk
27 February 1943	St. Margaret	United Kingdom	4,312	Sunk
10 June 1943	Esso Gettysburg	United States	10,173	Sunk
2 July 1943	Bloody Marsh	United States	10,195	Sunk
22 July 1943	Cherry Valley	United States	10,172	Damaged
26 February 1944	Silvermaple	United Kingdom	5,313	Sunk
1 March 1944	St. Louis	Free France	5,202	Sunk
5 March 1944	John Holt	United Kingdom	4,964	Sunk
21 March 1944	Matadian	United Kingdom	4,275	Sunk

== See also ==
- List of successful U-boats
- The Enemy Below

== Bibliography ==
- Busch, Rainer; Röll, Hans-Joachim (1999). German U-boat commanders of World War II : a biographical dictionary. Translated by Brooks, Geoffrey. London, Annapolis, Md: Greenhill Books, Naval Institute Press. ISBN 1-55750-186-6.
- Busch, Rainer; Röll, Hans-Joachim (1999). Der U-Boot-Krieg, 1939-1945: Deutsche U-Boot-Verluste von September 1939 bis Mai 1945 [German U-boat losses from September 1939 to May 1945] (in German). Vol. IV. Hamburg, Berlin, Bonn: Mittler. ISBN 3-8132-0514-2.
- Gröner, Eric; Jung, Dieter; Maass, Martin (1991). German Warships 1815-1945: U-boats and Mine Warfare Vessels. Vol. 2. Translated by Thomas, Keith; Magowan, Rachel. London: Conway Maritime Press. ISBN 0-85177-593-4.
- Blair, Clay (2000). Hitler's U-Boat War: The Hunted, 1942 – 1945. New York: Modern Library. ISBN 0-679-64033-9.
- Dunmore, Spencer (2002). Lost Subs: From the Hunley to the Kursk. The Greatest Submarines Ever Lost – and Found. Cambridge, MA: Da Capo Press. ISBN 0-306-81140-5.
- Morison, Samuel Eliot (1956). The Atlantic Battle Won, May 1943 – May 1945. History of United States Naval Operations in World War II. Vol. X. Boston: Little, Brown and Company. OCLC 768913584.
