= SS Arsterturm (1945) =

History
- Name: Betzdorf (1945); Empire Gaffer (1945-47); Baltrader (1947-52); Baltic Fir (1952-56); Arsterturm (1956-69); Unigoolnar (1969-76); Sudarsan Shakti (1976-81)
- Owner: Unternehmen der Eisenstahlindustrie (1945); Ministry of War Transport (1945-46); Ministry of Transport (1946-47); United Baltic Corporation (1947-56); Partenreederei Dampfer Arsterturm (1956); DDG Hansa(1956-69); Universal Shipping & Coastal Trading Pte Ltd (1969-76); Sudarsan Liners Ltd (1976-81)
- Operator: Friedrich Krupp & Co (1945); T. L. Duff & Co (1945-47); United Baltic Corporation (1947-56); Partenreedeerei Dampfer Arsterturm (1956); DDG Hansa (1956-69); Universal Shipping & Coastal Trading Pte Ltd (1969-76); Sudarsan Liners Ltd (1976-81)
- Port of registry: (Nazi Germany) Bremen, Germany (1945); London, United Kingdom (1945-56); Bremen, West Germany (1956-69); Bombay, India (1969-81)
- Builder: Deutsche Werft
- Yard number: 450
- Launched: 15 January 1945
- In service: 28 February 1945
- Identification: Code Letters DOZE (1945-46); United Kingdom Official Number 180643 (1945–56); Code Letters GJCB (1945–56); Code Letters DLCF (1956–69); Code Letters ATEK (1969-81); IMO number: 5025933 ( –1981)
- Fate: Scrapped

General characteristics
- Class & type: Hansa A type Cargo ship
- Tonnage: 1,942 GRT, 964 NRT, 3,245 DWT
- Length: 86.28 m (283 ft 1 in)
- Beam: 13.49 m (44 ft 3 in)
- Draught: 8.20 m (26 ft 11 in)
- Depth: 4.78 m (15 ft 8 in)
- Installed power: Compound steam engine, 1,200IHP
- Propulsion: Single screw propeller
- Speed: 10.5 knots (19.4 km/h)
- Crew: 35

Arsterturm was a Hansa A Type cargo ship which was built as Betzdorf in 1945 by Deutsche Werft, Hamburg, Germany for Unternehmen der Eisenstahlindustrie, Bremen. She was seized as a prize of war in 1945, passing to the Ministry of War Transport and renamed Empire Gaffer. Sold in 1947, renamed Baltrader then Baltic Fir in 1952, she was sold to West Germany in 1956, rebuilt and renamed Arsterturm. She was sold in 1969 to India and renamed Unigoolnar. A further sale in 1976 saw her renamed Sudarsan Shakti, serving until 1981 when she was scrapped.

== Description ==
As built, the ship was 86.28 m (283 ft 1 in) long, with a beam of 13.49 m (44 ft 3 in). She had a depth of 4.78 m (15 ft 8 in), and a draught of 8.20 m (26 ft 11 in). She was assessed as 1,942 GRT, 964 NRT, 3,245 DWT. She was equipped with 1x20-tonne, 1x10-tonne and 9x5-tonne cranes.

The ship was propelled by a compound steam engine, which had two cylinders of 42 cm (16 9/16 inches) and two cylinders of 90 cm (35 7/16 inches) diameter by 90 cm (35 7/16 inches) stroke. The engine was built by Ottensener Eisenwerk AG, Hamburg. Rated at 1,200IHP, it drove a single screw propeller and could propel the ship at 10.5 knots (19.4 km/h).

== History ==
Betzdorf was a Hansa A Type cargo ship built in 1945 as yard number 450 by Deutsche Werft, Hamburg, Germany for Unternehmen der EisenStahlindustrie, Bremen. She was launched on 15 January 1945 and completed on 28 February. With a complement of 35 men, Betzdorf was operated under the management of Friedrich Krupp & Co., Bremen. Her port of registry was Bremen and the Code Letters DOZE were allocated.

Betzdorf was seized as a prize of war at Kiel on 8 May 1945, and was passed to the Ministry of War Transport. She was renamed Empire Gaffer. The Code Letters GJCB and United Kingdom Official Number 180643 were allocated. Her port of registry was London and she was operated under the management of T. L. Duff & Co.

In June 1947, Empire Gaffer was sold to the United Baltic Corporation, London and was renamed Baltrader. She was renamed Baltic Fir in 1952.

In January 1956, Baltic Fir was sold to Partenreederei Dampfer Arstenturm, which was 95% owned by Bohlen & Behn and 5% by DDG Hansa Linie, both of Hamburg. She was rebuilt at Bremerhaven and renamed Arsterturm. On 18 June, she was bought by DDG Hansa. Her port of registry was Bremen and the Code Letters DLCF were allocated. With their introduction in the 1960s, Arsterturm was allocated the IMO Number 5025433.

On 29 March 1969, Arsterturm was sold to Universal Shipping & Coastal Trading Pte Ltd, Bombay, India and was renamed Unigoolnar. Her port of registry was Bombay and the Code Letters ATEK were allocated. She was sold in 1976 to Sudarsan Liners Ltd, Madras, India and was renamed Sudarsan Shakti. Damaged at Kuwait in 1980, she was scrapped in March 1981 by City Steel, Bombay.
