= SS Vorios Hellas =

Cargo ship

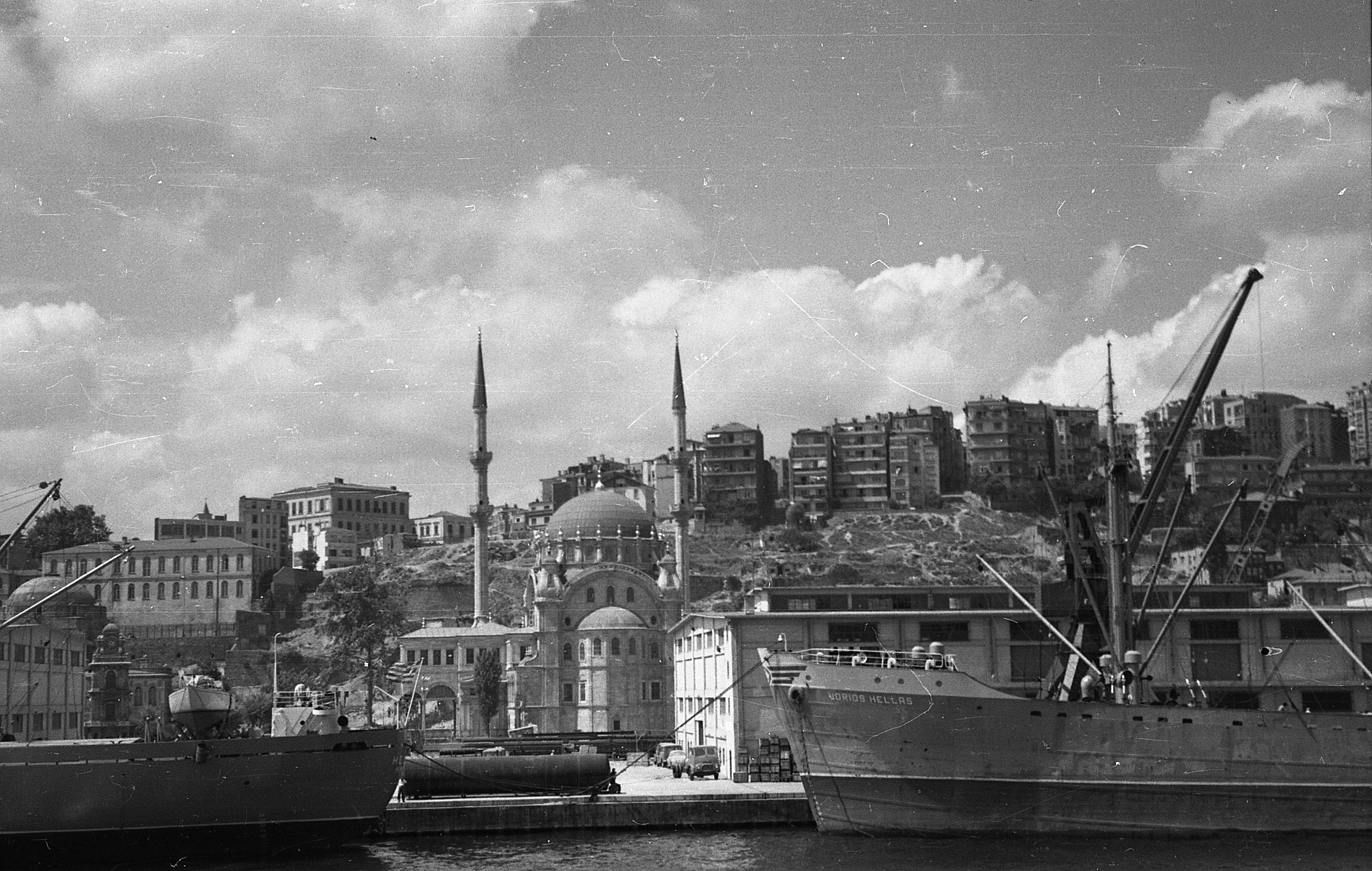
- Vorios Hellas, Istanbul, 1960

History
- Name: Sanga (1944-45); Empire Gatwick (1945-47); Vorios Hellas (1947-74)
- Owner: Deutsche Afrika Linien (1944-45); Ministry of War Transport (1945-46); Ministry of Transport (1946-47); Greek Government (1947-48); Hellenic Lines (1948-74); Papageorgiou Bros (1974)
- Operator: Deutsche Afrika Linien (1944-45); J T Salvesen (1945--47); Greek Government (1947-48); Hellenic Lines (1948-74); Papageorgiou Bros (19742)
- Port of registry: (Nazi Germany) Hamburg, Germany (1944-45); London, United Kingdom (1945-47); Piraeus, Greece (1947-74)
- Builder: Lübecker Flenderwerke AG
- Yard number: 403
- Launched: 1944
- Completed: July 1944
- Out of service: 1974
- Identification: United Kingdom Official Number 180763 (1945-47); Code Letters GNMT (1945-47); Code Letters SVSL (1947-74); Lloyd's Register Number 5383691 ( –1974)
- Fate: Scrapped

General characteristics
- Class & type: Hansa A type Cargo ship
- Tonnage: 1,924 GRT, 935 NRT, 3,400 DWT
- Length: 85.22 m (279 ft 7 in)
- Beam: 13.51 m (44 ft 4 in)
- Draught: 5.59 m (18 ft 4 in)
- Depth: 4.80 m (15 ft 9 in)
- Installed power: Compound steam engine, 1,200IHP
- Propulsion: Single screw propeller
- Speed: 10.5 knots (19.4 km/h)

Vorios Hellas was a Hansa A Type cargo ship which was built as Sanga in 1944 by Lübecker Flenderwerke AG, Lübeck, Germany for Deutsche Afrika Linie, Hamburg . She was seized as a prize of war in 1945, passing to the Ministry of War Transport and renamed Empire Gatwick. She was allocated to Greece in 1947 and was renamed Vorios Hellas. She was sold to Hellenic Lines in 1948. She was sold and scrapped in 1974.

== Description ==
The ship was 85.22 m (279 ft 7 in) long, with a beam of 13.51 m (44 ft 4 in). She had a depth of 4.80 m (15 ft 9 in), and a draught of 5.59 m (18 ft 4 in). She was assessed as 1,925 GRT, 935 NRT, 3,400 DWT.

The ship was propelled by a compound steam engine, which had two cylinders of 42 cm (16 9/16 in) and two cylinders of 90 cm (35 7/16 in) diameter by 90 cm (35 7/16 in) inches stroke. The engine was built by Waggon- und Maschinenbau GmbH, Görlitz. Rated at 1,200IHP, it drove a single screw propeller and could propel the ship at 10.5 knots (19.4 km/h).

== History ==
Sanga was a Hansa A Type cargo ship built in 1944 as yard number 403 by Lübecker Flenderwerke AG, Lübeck, Germany for Deutsche Afrika Linie, Hamburg. She was completed in July 1944. Her port of registry was Hamburg.

In May 1945, Sanga was seized as a prize of war at Copenhagen, Denmark. She was passed to the Ministry of War Transport and was renamed Empire Gatwick. The Code Letters GNMT and United Kingdom Official Number 180763 were allocated. Her port of registry was London and she was operated under the management of J T Salvesen Ltd., Leith.

In 1947, Empire Gatwick was allocated to Greece. The Greek government sold her in 1948 to Hellenic Lines and was renamed Vorios Hellas. She was one of two ex-German ships allocated to Hellenic Lines out of the five that they applied for - the other ship was the Rodopi, Her port of registry was Piraeus and the Code Letters SVSL were allocated. With their introduction in the 1960s, Vorios Hellas was allocated the Lloyd's Register Number 5383691. She was sold in 1974 to Papageorgiou Bros, Piraeus. She was scrapped in April 1974 by Centas Celik, Gemlik, Turkey.
