= SS Aghios Nectarios =

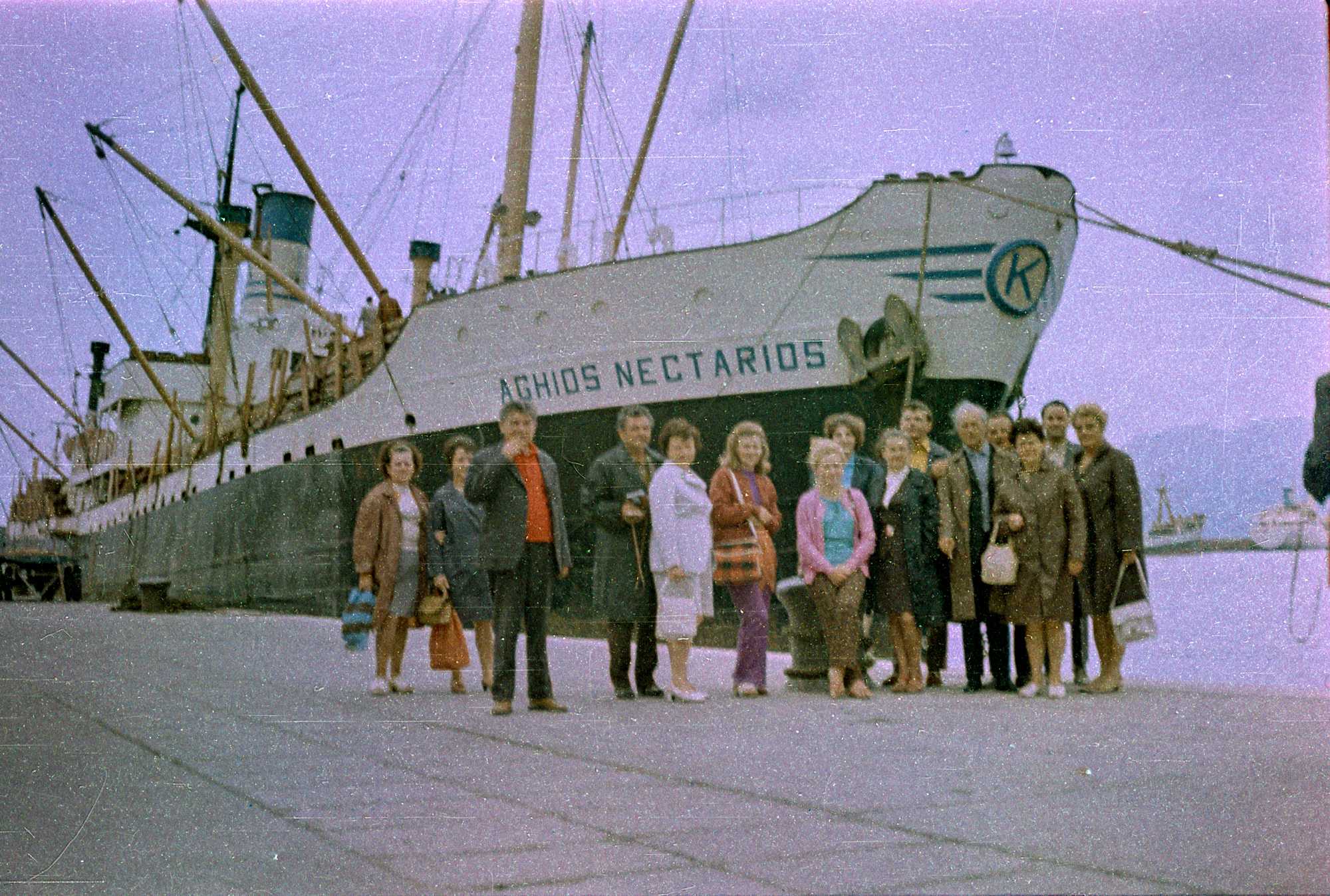
- SS Aghios Nectarios in the port of Rovinj, Croatia, after 1967

History
- Name: Kalliope (1944–45); Empire Garrison (1945–47); Bengore Head (1947–67); Aghios Nectarios (1967–74)
- Owner: Neptun Line (1944–45); Ministry of War Transport (1945–46); Ministry of Transport (1946–47); Ulster Steamship Co (1947–67); Kyrle Compagnia Naviera SA (1967–71); Aldebaran Shipping (1971–74)
- Operator: Neptun Line (1944–45); G Heyn & Sons Ltd (1945–67); Canopus Shipping SA (1967–71); Aldebaran Shipping (1971–74)
- Port of registry: (Nazi Germany) Bremen, Germany (1944–45); London, United Kingdom (1945–67); Piraeus, Greece (1967–71); Famagusta, Cyprus (1971–74)
- Builder: NV Koninklijk Maatschappij de Schelde
- Yard number: 249
- Launched: 15 April 1944
- Completed: August 1944
- Out of service: 1974
- Identification: United Kingdom Official Number 180668 (1945–67); Code Letters GMRP (1945–67); IMO number: 5040998 (–1971)
- Fate: Scrapped

General characteristics
- Class & type: Hansa A type Cargo ship
- Tonnage: 1,925 GRT, 804 NRT, 3,200 DWT
- Length: 85.27 m (279 ft 9 in)
- Beam: 13.51 m (44 ft 4 in)
- Draught: 5.59 m (18 ft 4 in)
- Depth: 4.80 m (15 ft 9 in)
- Installed power: Compound steam engine, 1,200IHP
- Propulsion: Single screw propeller
- Speed: 10.5 knots (19.4 km/h)

Aghios Nectarios was a Hansa A Type cargo ship which was built as Kalliope in 1944 by NV Koninklijk Maatschappij de Schelde, Vlissingen, Netherlands for Neptun Line, Bremen, Germany. She was seized as a prize of war in 1945, passing to the Ministry of War Transport and renamed Empire Garrison. She was sold in 1947 and was renamed Bengore Head. She was sold to Greece in 1967 and renamed Aghios Nectarios. Following a sale to Cyprus in 1971, she served until 1974, when she was scrapped.

== Description ==
The ship was 85.27 m (279 ft 9 in) long, with a beam of 13.51 m (44 ft 4 in). She had a depth of 4.80 m (15 ft 9 in). She was assessed as 1,923 GRT, 804 NRT, 3,200 DWT.

The ship was propelled by a compound steam engine, which had two cylinders of 42 cm (16 9/16 in) and two cylinders of 90 cm (35 7/16 in) diameter by 90 cm (35 7/16 in) inches stroke. The engine was built by NV Koninklijk Maatschappij de Schelde. Rated at 1,200IHP, it drove a single screw propeller and could propel the ship at 10.5 knots (19.4 km/h).

== History ==
Kalliope was a Hansa A Type cargo ship built in 1944 as yard number 249 by NV Koninklijk Maatschappij de Schelde, Vlissingen, Netherlands for Neptun Line, Bremen, Germany. She was launched in on 15 April and delivered in August. Her port of registry was Bremen.

In May 1945, Kalliope was seized as a prize of war at Kiel. She was passed to the British Ministry of War Transport and was renamed Empire Garrison. The Code Letters GMRP and United Kingdom Official Number 180668 were allocated. Her port of registry was London and she was operated under the management of G Heyn & Sons Ltd.

In 1947, Empire Garrison was sold to the Ulster Steamship Co. and was renamed Bengore Head. She was operated under the management of G Heyn & Sons. With their introduction in the 1960s, Bengore Head was allocated the IMO Number 5040988.

In 1967, Bengore Head was sold to Kyrle Compagnia Naviera SA, Piraeus, Greece and was renamed Aghios Nektarios. She was operated under the management of Canopus Shipping SA. She was sold to Aldebaran Shipping Co., Famagusta, Cyprus in 1971. She served until January 1974, when she was scrapped in Spain.
