= SS Yaroslavl =

History
- Name: Santander (1943-45); Empire Gage (1945); Arnhem (1945-46); Empire Gage (1946); Yaroslavl (1946-71)
- Owner: Oldenburg Portugiesische Dampschiffs Rhederei (1943-45); Ministry of War Transport (1945-46); Sovtorgflot (1946-71)
- Operator: Oldenburg Portugiesische Dampschiffs Rhederei (1943-45); Ellerman's Wilson Line Ltd (1945); A Veder & co (1945-46); Baltic Shipping Co (1946-49); Sakhalin Shipping Co (1949-71)
- Port of registry: (Nazi Germany) Bremen, Germany (1943-45); London, United Kingdom (1945); The Hague, Netherlands (1945-46); (United Kingdom) London (1946); Leningrad, Soviet Union (1946-49); Kholmsk, Soviet Union (1949-71)
- Builder: Deutsche Werft
- Yard number: 429
- Laid down: 29 March 1943
- Launched: 13 August 1943
- In service: 21 October 1943
- Identification: United Kingdom Official Number 180584 (1945, 46); Code Letters GJFB (1945, 46); Code Letters PCUM (1945–46); Code Letters UKEG (1946-71)
- Fate: Scrapped

General characteristics
- Class & type: Hansa A type Cargo ship
- Tonnage: 1,925 GRT, 986 NRT, 3,100 DWT
- Length: 92.05 m (302 ft 0 in) overall; 86.34 m (283 ft 3 in) between perpendiculars
- Beam: 13.51 m (44 ft 4 in)
- Draught: 5.62 m (18 ft 5 in)
- Depth: 4.80 m (15 ft 9 in)
- Installed power: Compound steam engine, 1,200IHP
- Speed: 10.5 knots (19.4 km/h)
- Capacity: 5,400 cubic metres (189,000 cu ft) grain; 5,000 cubic metres (176,000 cu ft) bale goods

Yaroslavl (Russian: Ярослáвль) was a Hansa A Type cargo ship which was built as Santander in 1943 by Deutsche Werft, Hamburg, Germany for the Oldenburg Portugiesische Dampschiffs Rhederei. She was seized as a prize of war in 1945, passing to the Ministry of War Transport and renamed Empire Gage. She was chartered to the Dutch government later that year and was renamed Arnhem. Allocated to the Soviet Union in 1946, she was renamed Yaroslavl. She served until 1971, when she was scrapped.

== Description ==
The ship was 92.05 m (302 ft 0 in) long overall (86.34 m (283 ft 3 in) between perpendiculars), with a beam of 13.51 m (44 ft 4 in). She had a depth of 4.80 m (15 ft 9 in), and a draught of 5.62 m (18 ft 5 in). She was assessed as 1,942 GRT, 964 NRT, 3,100 DWT. She had a capacity of 5,400 cubic metres (189,000 cu ft) grain of 5,000 cubic metres (176,000 cu ft) of bale goods.

The ship was propelled by a compound steam engine, which had two cylinders of 42 cm (16 9/16 inches) and two cylinders of 90 cm (35 7/16 inches) diameter by 90 cm (35 7/16 inches) stroke. The engine was built by Deutsche Werft. Rated at 1,200IHP, it could propel the ship at 10.5 knots (19.4 km/h).

== History ==
Santander was a Hansa A Type cargo ship built in 1943 as yard number 429 -by Deutsche Werft, Hamburg, Germany for Oldenburg Portugiesische Dampschiffs Rhederei, Oldenburg. Her port of registry was Bremen. Laid down on 29 March 1943, she was launched on 13 August and completed on 21 October.

In May 1945, Santander was seized as a prize of war at Copenhagen, Denmark, where she was housing refugees from the Ostgebiete. She was passed to the Ministry of War Transport. She was renamed Empire Gage. The Code Letters GJFB and United Kingdom Official Number 180584 were allocated. Her port of registry was London and she was operated under the management of Ellerman's Wilson Line Ltd. In August, she was chartered by the Dutch Government. She was placed under the control of the Maatschappij Zeetransport NV and operated under the management of A Veder & Co. Her port or registry was The Hague and the Code Letters PCUM were allocated. When the charter ended she was returned to the United Kingdom and renamed Empire Gage.

In April 1946, Empire Gage was allocated to the Soviet Union and was renamed Yaroslavl. Owned by Sovtorgflot, She was operated by the Baltic Shipping Company. Her port of registry was Leningrad and the Code Letters UKEG were allocated. Circa 1949, she was transferred to the Sakhalin Shipping Co., Kholmsk. She served until 1971, when she was scrapped in the Soviet Union.
