= List of shipwrecks in 1946 =

The list of shipwrecks in 1946 includes ships sunk, foundered, grounded, or otherwise lost during 1946.

table of contents
1946
Jan	Feb	Mar	Apr
May	Jun	Jul	Aug
Sep	Oct	Nov	Dec
Unknown date

== January ==
=== 1 January ===
List of shipwrecks: 1 January 1946
Ship	State	Description
USS Dorsey	United States Navy	The hulk of the high-speed minesweeper, aground at Okinawa since 9 October 1945, was destroyed.
Empire Stella	United Kingdom	The Stella-type tug suffered a boiler explosion which wrecked her engine. Subsequently repaired with the engine from Empire Keith (United Kingdom).

=== 2 January ===
List of shipwrecks: 2 January 1946
Ship	State	Description
U-516	Kriegsmarine	Operation Deadlight: The captured Type IXC submarine was scuttled in the Atlantic Ocean (56°06′N 9°00′W).
U-2502	Kriegsmarine	Operation Deadlight: The Type XXI submarine was scuttled in the Atlantic Ocean (56°06′N 9°00′W).
William H. Webb	United States	The Liberty ship ran aground on a reef off Kildin Island, Soviet Union and broke in two.

=== 3 January ===
List of shipwrecks: 3 January 1946
Ship	State	Description
Empire Tigachi	United Kingdom	The coastal tanker ran aground at Nidingen, Sweden. Later broke in two, a total loss.
U-825	Kriegsmarine	Operation Deadlight. The Type VIIC submarine was sunk in the Atlantic Ocean (55°31′N 7°30′W).
U-2336	Kriegsmarine	Operation Deadlight: The Type XXIII submarine was shelled and sunk in the Atlantic Ocean (56°06′N 9°00′W) by HMS Offa (Royal Navy).
U-2351	Kriegsmarine	Operation Deadlight: The Type XXIII submarine was shelled and sunk in the Atlantic Ocean (55°50′N 8°20′W) by HMS Offa (Royal Navy).

=== 5 January ===
List of shipwrecks: 5 January 1946
Ship	State	Description
U-541	Kriegsmarine	Operation Deadlight: The Type IXC/40 submarine was scuttled in the Atlantic Ocean (55°38′N 7°35′W).
U-901	Kriegsmarine	Operation Deadlight: The Type VIIC submarine was scuttled in the Atlantic Ocean (55°50′N 8°30′W).
U-2506	Kriegsmarine	Operation Deadlight: The Type XXI submarine was scuttled in the Atlantic Ocean (55°37′N 7°30′W).

=== 6 January ===
List of shipwrecks: 6 January 1946
Ship	State	Description
U-1109	Kriegsmarine	Operation Deadlight: The Type VIIC/41 submarine was scuttled in the Atlantic Ocean (55°49′N 8°31′W) by HMS Templar (Royal Navy).
U-2356	Kriegsmarine	Operation Deadlight: The Type XXIII submarine was scuttled in the Atlantic Ocean (55°50′N 8°20′W) by HMS Onslaught (Royal Navy).

=== 7 January ===
List of shipwrecks: 7 January 1946
Ship	State	Description
U-1010	Kriegsmarine	Operation Deadlight: The Type VIIC/41 submarine was scuttled in the Atlantic Ocean (55°37′N 7°49′W) by ORP Garland (Polish Navy).
U-1023	Kriegsmarine	Operation Deadlight: The Type VIIC/41 submarine was scuttled in the Atlantic Ocean (55°49′N 8°24′W).
U-2511	Kriegsmarine	Operation Deadlight: The Type XXI submarine was scuttled in the Atlantic Ocean (55°33′N 7°38′W).

=== 8 January ===
List of shipwrecks: 8 January 1946
Ship	State	Description
HMS Safari	Royal Navy	The decommissioned S-class submarine sank under tow in the English Channel while on her way to the breaker′s yard.

=== 11 January ===
List of shipwrecks: 11 January 1946
Ship	State	Description
Trapez 5	Allied-occupied Germany	The tanker was scuttled of Multedo, Italy.

=== 13 January ===
List of shipwrecks: 13 January 1946
Ship	State	Description
Sierra Cordoba	United Kingdom	The passenger ship was damaged by fire.

=== 14 January ===
List of shipwrecks: 14 January 1946
Ship	State	Description
USS Snowbell	United States Navy	The hulk of the Ailanthus-class net laying ship, aground at Okinawa since 9 October 1945, was destroyed with explosives.
USS Southard	United States Navy	The hulk of the fast minesweeper, a former Clemson-class destroyer, aground at Okinawa since 9 October 1945, was destroyed with explosives.

=== 15 January ===
List of shipwrecks: 15 January 1946
Ship	State	Description
British Loyalty	United Kingdom	The tanker was scuttled in the Indian Ocean at Addu Atoll, Maldives (0°38′12″S 73°07′43″E).
William H. Webb	United States	The Liberty ship ran aground on Kildin Island, Soviet Union. She broke in two and was a total loss. She was on a voyage from Philadelphia, Pennsylvania to Murmansk, Soviet Union.

=== 18 January ===
List of shipwrecks: 18 January 1946
Ship	State	Description
Roald	United States	The 8-gross register ton, 29.7-foot (9.1 m) fishing vessel sank off Southeast Alaska at (56°30′N 133°00′W) near Horn Cliff (56°47′40″N 132°40′00″W).

=== 20 January ===
List of shipwrecks: 20 January 1946
Ship	State	Description
Dursley	United Kingdom	The cargo ship ran aground off Redcar, Yorkshire.

=== 23 January ===
List of shipwrecks: 23 January 1946
Ship	State	Description
Gradisca	Italy	The passenger ship ran aground on the east coast of Gavdos, Greece. She was refloated on 9 July 1947 and laid up. She was consequently scrapped in 1950.

=== 24 January ===
List of shipwrecks: 24 January 1946
Ship	State	Description
Carnifex Ferry	United States	The tanker collided with F F Wolfe (United Kingdom) in The Downs off the coast of Kent, United Kingdom and was severely damaged at the bows.
Cobble Hill	United States	The tanker ran aground off Sheerness, Kent, United Kingdom.

=== 25 January ===
List of shipwrecks: 25 January 1946
Ship	State	Description
Kazan Maru	Allied-occupied Japan	The cargo ship was scuttled in the Strait of Malacca.

=== 27 January ===
List of shipwrecks: 27 January 1946
Ship	State	Description
USAT Crown Reefer	United States Army	During a voyage transporting perishables and cargo from Seattle, Washington, to Kodiak, Territory of Alaska, and military bases in the Aleutian Islands, the 5,100-ton United States Army Transport – a refrigerated cargo ship – was abandoned when she ran aground off Kirilof Point (51°25′15″N 179°17′50″E) on the coast of Amchitka Island in the Aleutians. A United States Navy rescue tug rescued her entire crew of 39. She later broke up.
Gradisca	United Kingdom	The troopship ran aground on Gavos, Greece.
USS Tamaroa	United States Navy	The tug collided with the aviation supply ship USS Jupiter (United States Navy) in San Francisco Bay and sank.

=== 28 January ===
List of shipwrecks: 28 January 1946
Ship	State	Description
Bluenose	Honduras	The motor-schooner ran aground off Île à Vache, Haiti and broke up.

=== 29 January ===
List of shipwrecks: 29 January 1946
Ship	State	Description
HDMS ME 1016	Royal Danish Navy	The minesweeper ran aground off Jernhatten. She was declared a total loss.

=== 30 January ===
List of shipwrecks: 30 January 1946
Ship	State	Description
Antietam	United States	The tanker struck a mine in the Gironde Estuary and sank with the loss of one of her 41 crew. Survivors were rescued by a French pilot boat. Antietam was on a voyage from New York to Blaye, Gironde.
Luray Victory	United States	The Victory ship ran aground and sank, Goodwin Sands, Kent, United Kingdom. She was on a voyage from Baltimore, Maryland to Bremerhaven, Allied-occupied Germany.

=== Unknown date ===
List of shipwrecks: Unknown date January 1946
Ship	State	Description
Akagi Maru	Japan	The merchant ship struck a mine and sank in the Seto Inland Sea off Okayama Prefecture, Japan. She was raised, repaired, and returned to service.
James Woodrow	United States	The Liberty ship ran aground on a reef in the Pacific Ocean. She was refloated and towed to Suisun Bay, where she was declared a constructive total loss.

== February ==
=== 1 February ===
List of shipwrecks: 1 February 1946
Ship	State	Description
Fort Massac	United Kingdom	The cargo ship collided with Thornaby (United Kingdom) near the Sunk Light Vessel ( Trinity House ), 10 nautical miles (19 km) east south east of Harwich (51°53′N 1°32′E). Fort Massac sank, Thornaby put into Harwich with severely damaged bows.

=== 2 February ===
List of shipwrecks: 2 February 1946
Ship	State	Description
U-764	Kriegsmarine	Operation Deadlight: The Type VIIC submarine was scuttled in the Atlantic Ocean (56°06′N 9°00′W).

=== 3 February ===
List of shipwrecks: 3 February 1946
Ship	State	Description
HMS Captive	Royal Navy	The rescue tug was beached in Potomas Bay, Cyprus.
I-505	Imperial Japanese Navy	The Type VIID submarine was scuttled in the Sunda Strait by the destroyer HNLMS Kortenaer (Royal Netherlands Navy).
Rian	Netherlands	The coaster collided with the minesweeper HNLMS Jan van Gelder (Royal Netherlands Navy) and sank off Ramsey, Isle of Man. All six crew were rescued by Jan van Gelder.

=== 4 February ===
List of shipwrecks: 4 February 1946
Ship	State	Description
Per Gynt	United States	The 20-gross register ton 39.9-foot (12.2 m) fishing vessel sank in Gardiner Bay (54°49′30″N 131°57′45″W) on the southeast coast of Prince of Wales Island in the Alexander Archipelago in Southeast Alaska.
Yukon	United States	With 480 people – 369 passengers and 111 crew members – aboard, the 5,746-gross register ton, 360-foot (109.7 m) steam passenger ship ran aground at Cape Fairfield in Johnstone Bay, Territory of Alaska, and broke in two. With surf reaching heights of 40 feet (12.2 m) and pounding the ship to pieces, rescue operations took three days. Eleven people – five civilians and six United States Army soldiers – died in the disaster.

=== 5 February ===
List of shipwrecks: 5 February 1946
Ship	State	Description
Nathan Hale	United States	The Liberty ship struck a mine off Gorgona, Italy and was severely damaged. She put in to Livorno. Declared a constructive total loss, she was scrapped at Savona, Italy in April 1949.
U-1228	Kriegsmarine	The Type IXC/40 submarine was scuttled in the Atlantic Ocean off the East Coast of the United States.

=== 6 February ===
List of shipwrecks: 6 February 1946
Ship	State	Description
Sphene	United Kingdom	The coaster foundered in the Bristol Channel off Cornwall. All five crew were rescued.

=== 8 February ===
List of shipwrecks: 8 February 1946
Ship	State	Description
Empire Waveney	United Kingdom	The ocean liner caught fire at Liverpool, Lancashire. The fire was extinguished.

=== 10 February ===
List of shipwrecks: 10 February 1946
Ship	State	Description
Empire Severn	United Kingdom	The cargo ship collided with Leighton (United Kingdom) in the Holy Loch and was damaged.
Girl Lena	United Kingdom	The trawler collided with HMS Saga (Royal Navy) in the English Channel near the Eddystone Lighthouse and sank. The crew were rescued by HMS Saga.
Lindøy	Norway	Capsized and sank south of Sogneoksen whilst on a voyage from Bulandet to Bergen, Norway.
U-975	Kriegsmarine	Operation Deadlight: The Type VIIC submarine was scuttled in the Atlantic Ocean (55°42′N 9°01′W) by HMS Loch Arkaig (Royal Navy).

=== 11 February ===
List of shipwrecks: 11 February 1946
Ship	State	Description
USS Greene	United States Navy	The hulk of the seaplane tender, a former Clemson-class destroyer aground at Okinawa since 9 October 1945, was destroyed with explosives.
Ponce de Lyon	United States	The Liberty ship ran aground at The Gantocks, off Dunoon, Argyllshire, Scotland.

=== 12 February ===
List of shipwrecks: 12 February 1946
Ship	State	Description
I-501	Imperial Japanese Navy	The Type IXD2 submarine was scuttled in the Strait of Malacca (3°05′50″N 100°41′50″E) by HMS Loch Glendhu and HMS Loch Lomond (both Royal Navy).
U-3514	Kriegsmarine	Operation Deadlight: The Type XXI submarine was scuttled in the Atlantic Ocean (56°00′N 10°05′W) by HMS Loch Arkaig (Royal Navy). She was the last U-boat sunk in Operation Deadlight.

=== 13 February ===
List of shipwrecks: 13 February 1946
Ship	State	Description
Vis	Yugoslavia	World War II: The cargo ship struck a naval mine and sank in the Adriatic Sea off the coast of Dalmatia.

=== 14 February ===
List of shipwrecks: 14 February 1946
Ship	State	Description
Fulham VII	United Kingdom	The coaster collided with Alfred Victory (United States) and sank 16 nautical miles (30 km) south west of Beachy Head, Sussex with the loss of one of her seventeen crew. Fulham VII was on a voyage from Barry, Glamorgan to London.
Lake Crystal	United States	Under tow by a tug and carrying a cargo of coal, the 254-foot (77 m), 2,308-gross register ton barge sank in heavy seas in 130 feet (40 m) of water in Block Island Sound 4 nautical miles (7.4 km; 4.6 mi) southeast of Watch Hill, Rhode Island, at 41°15.985′N 071°46.428′W, with the loss of seven lives. There was one survivor.
Tijger	Netherlands	The coaster collided with the Liberty ship Edward R. Squibb (United States) east of the Goodwin Sands, Kent, United Kingdom and sank. All eight people on board were rescued.

=== 15 February ===
List of shipwrecks: 15 February 1946
Ship	State	Description
I-502	Imperial Japanese Navy	The Type IXD2 submarine was scuttled in the Strait of Malacca off Singapore by HMS Loch Lomond (Royal Navy).
I-506	Imperial Japanese Navy	The Type IXD1 submarine was scuttled in the Bali Sea east of the Kangean Islands, Dutch East Indies by a Royal Navy ship.

=== 16 February ===
List of shipwrecks: 16 February 1946
Ship	State	Description
Robert G. Cann	Canada	During a voyage from St. John, New Brunswick, Canada, to Yarmouth, Nova Scotia, Canada, via Tiverton, Nova Scotia, the 119-foot (36 m), 265-gross register ton coastal screw steamer sank in approximately 400 feet (120 m) of water in the Bay of Fundy 8 nautical miles (15 km; 9.2 mi) southeast of Swallowtail Lighthouse on Grand Manan during a blizzard. Her entire crew of 13 men abandoned ship in a 17-foot (5.2 m) lifeboat, but by the time the lifeboat came ashore at Digby Neck, Nova Scotia, 19 hours later, 12 of them had died of hypothermia, leaving her captain as her only survivor.

=== 17 February ===
List of shipwrecks: 15 February 1946
Ship	State	Description
Donbass III	Soviet Union	The 10,488-ton Type T2 tanker broke in two in a storm in the Pacific Ocean approximately 40 nautical miles (74 km; 46 mi) south of Adak, Alaska. Three Soviet ships rescued 15 survivors from the forward part of the ship. The T2 tanker Puente Hills (United States) rescued 23 men and women from the after section of the ship, which she then towed to Port Angeles, Washington with 20 people still aboard it. Both sections of the ship remained afloat and eventually were scrapped.

=== 19 February ===
List of shipwrecks: 15 February 1946
Ship	State	Description
Emire Severn	United Kingdom	The cargo ship again collided with Leighton (United Kingdom) and was damaged further.
MAL 38	Soviet Navy	The MAL 2 type landing fire support lighter (Soviet designation unknown) was wrecked.

=== 21 February ===
List of shipwrecks: 21 February 1946
Ship	State	Description
Edna S	United States	The 20-gross register ton, 42.4-foot (12.9 m) fishing vessel was destroyed by fire near Hoonah, Territory of Alaska.

=== 24 February ===
List of shipwrecks: 24 February 1946
Ship	State	Description
Hodnaberg	Norway	The steamship struck a mine in the Kattegat and sank with the loss of nine crew.

=== 25 February ===
List of shipwrecks: 25 February 1946
Ship	State	Description
Leeuwarden	United Kingdom	The cargo ship struck a mine and sank 18 nautical miles (33 km) north of Dieppe, France. All crew were rescued by the trawler André Marcel (France).

=== 28 February ===
List of shipwrecks: 28 February 1946
Ship	State	Description
Herisle	United Kingdom	The cargo ship was hit by William A. Jones (United States) after the latter broke free from her moorings in a gale at Gibraltar. Two hours later, there were two explosions on board and she sank with the loss of five of her 34 crew.

=== Unknown date ===
List of shipwrecks: Unknown date 1946
Ship	State	Description
Fort Frederica	United States	The T2 tanker ran aground on the Goodwin Sands, Kent, United Kingdom. She was on a voyage from Trinidad to Hull, Yorkshire, United Kingdom. She was refloated and completed her voyage.
USS Lanikai	United States Navy	The decommissioned schooner sank in Subic Bay in a storm in February 1946 or during a typhoon sometime in 1947.
No. 13	Imperial Japanese Navy	The surrendered T51-class motor torpedo boat was lost in February.
U-1197	Kriegsmarine	The Type VIIC submarine was scuttled in the North Sea by the United States Navy.

== March ==
=== 1 March ===
List of shipwrecks: 1 March 1946
Ship	State	Description
Orphée	French Navy	The Diane-class submarine exploded at Casablanca, Morocco. Two of her crew were killed.
Sackett's Harbor	United States	The 10,488-gross register ton T2 tanker broke in two in a storm in the North Pacific Ocean southeast of Attu Island, about 800 nautical miles (1,500 km; 920 mi) southwest of Adak, Alaska. Two cats died, but there was no loss of human life. Her bow section later was sunk by gunfire by the patrol frigate USS Orlando (United States Navy). Her stern section reached the vicinity of Adak under its own power, where the tug Sarsi (United States) came to its assistance. The stern section was towed to Anchorage, Alaska, where it served as a floating power plant from 1946 to 1955. It was then towed to Seattle, Washington, where it received a new bow around 1957 and returned to service as Angelo Petri (United States).

=== 2 March ===
List of shipwrecks: 2 March 1946
Ship	State	Description
Empire Waveney	United Kingdom	The ocean liner caught fire at Canada Dock, Liverpool, Lancashire and sank. She was refloated on 4 March. Declared a total loss, scrapped in 1947.

=== 4 March ===
List of shipwrecks: 4 March 1946
Ship	State	Description
Bolivar	Norway	The cargo ship was wrecked and broke in two at Kish Bank, Ireland.
USS Extricate	United States Navy	The hulk of the Anchor-class rescue and salvage ship, aground at Okinawa since 9 October 1945, was destroyed with explosives.
HMS MFV 411	Royal Navy	The MFV-1-class motor fishing vessel was lost at Brisbane, Australia.
HMS MFV 812	Royal Navy	The MFV-601-class motor fishing vessel was lost at Brisbane, Australia.

=== 5 March ===
List of shipwrecks: 5 March 1946
Ship	State	Description
Kielce	Poland	The cargo ship, loaded with ammunition, collided with Lombardy (United Kingdom) in the English Channel off Dover, Kent, United Kingdom and sank. All crew were rescued by Lombardy. On 22 July 1967, attempted removal of the wreck caused a major explosion, damaging property onshore.

=== 6 March ===
List of shipwrecks: 6 March 1946
Ship	State	Description
George W. Norris	United States	The Liberty ship ran aground at Tanageshima, Japan and was wrecked.
USS LSM-265	United States Navy	The LSM-1-class Landing Ship Medium was sunk as a torpedo target by a United States Navy submarine in the Pacific Ocean off Pearl Harbor, Hawaii.
Osashi	Imperial Japanese Navy	The incomplete Ohama-class escort foundered from leaks at Yokohama, Japan.

=== 9 March ===
List of shipwrecks: 9 March 1946
Ship	State	Description
William L. Davidson	United States	The Liberty ship was driven ashore near the Osko Lighthouse, Norway. She was later refloated and towed to the United States. Subsequently served as a hulk with the United States Navy.

=== 11 March ===
List of shipwrecks: 4 March 1946
Ship	State	Description
USS Roche	United States Navy	The damaged hulk of the decommissioned Cannon-class destroyer escort, was sunk in the Pacific Ocean off Yokosuka, Japan.

=== 16 March ===
List of shipwrecks: 16 March 1946
Ship	State	Description
Byron Darnton	United States	The Liberty ship was driven ashore on Sanda Island, Argyllshire, United Kingdom (55°17′N 5°35′W). She broke in two, a total loss.
Falkenfels	Germany	The cargo ship was scuttled in the Skagerrak with a cargo of obsolete chemical ammunition.
Hugo Oldendorf	Germany	The cargo ship was scuttled in the Skagerrak with a cargo of poison gas munitions.
Karl Leonhardt	Germany	The 6,042 GRT cargo ship was scuttled in the Skagerrak with a cargo of poison gas munitions.
Lotte	Germany	The cargo ship was scuttled in the North Sea with a cargo of poison gas munitions.
USS YO-185	United States Navy	The YOG-40 class fuel oil barge sank in deep water off Saipan.

=== 17 March ===
List of shipwrecks: 17 March 1946
Ship	State	Description
Byron Darmton	United States	The Liberty ship ran aground on Sanda Island, Argyllshire, United Kingdom and broke in two.

=== 25 March ===
List of shipwrecks: 25 March 1946
Ship	State	Description
HMS MFV 777	Royal Navy	The MFV-601-class motor fishing vessel burned at Hong Kong.
Venus	United States	The 42-gross register ton 52.4-foot (16.0 m) motor cargo vessel was destroyed by fire in Sumner Strait near McNamara Point (56°19′50″N 133°03′45″W) in Southeast Alaska.

=== 26 March ===
List of shipwrecks: 26 March 1946
Ship	State	Description
J. P. Poe	United States	The Liberty ship ran aground near Dover, Kent, United Kingdom. She was refloated with assistance from the Walmer Lifeboat ( Royal National Lifeboat Institution).
HMS LCI(L) 4	Royal Navy	The landing craft infantry (large) was lost in the Far East.
Muggur	Norway	The cargo ship capsized and sank in Ofotfjord after her cargo of herring and timber shifted.
Z34	Germany	The destroyer was scuttled in the Skagerrak.

=== 27 March ===
List of shipwrecks: 27 March 1946
Ship	State	Description
Essu	United States	The 9-gross register ton, 32.5-foot (9.9 m) fishing vessel was destroyed by fire in the small-boat harbor at Wrangell, Territory of Alaska.
Suiyang	United Kingdom	The cargo ship struck a mine in the Chao Phraya River 4 nautical miles (7.4 km) upstream of Paknam, Thailand. She was beached but was declared a total loss.

=== 28 March ===
List of shipwrecks: 28 March 1946
Ship	State	Description
Santa Rita	Italy	The cargo ship struck a mine and sank in the Mediterranean Sea (42°35′N 10°10′E).

=== 30 March ===
List of shipwrecks: 30 March 1946
Ship	State	Description
Nickajack Trail	United States	The T2 tanker was wrecked at the Enewetak Atoll, Marshall Islands. She was on a voyage from Port Arthur to Yokohama, Japan. The wreck was still in situ as of December 1970.

=== 31 March ===
List of shipwrecks: 31 March 1946
Ship	State	Description
Joseph S. McDonagh	United States	The Liberty ship ran aground at the mouth of the Cañete River, Peru. She was on a voyage from Talcahuano, Chile to Le Havre, Seine-Maritime, France. She was a total loss.
Oneida Victory	United States	The Victory ship collided with the T2 tanker W. L. R. Emmet (United States) off Santa Barbara, California and was severely damaged. She was consequently scrapped.

=== Unknown date ===
List of shipwrecks: unknown date in March 1946
Ship	State	Description
Talabot	Norway	The cargo ship was scuttled off Malta.

== April ==
=== 1 April ===
List of shipwrecks: 1 April 1946
Ship	State	Description
Ha-103	Imperial Japanese Navy	Operation Road's End: The captured Sen'yu-Shō type submarine was scuttled by United States Navy forces in the East China Sea off Japan's Gotō Islands at 32°30′N 128°40′E.
Ha-105	Imperial Japanese Navy	Operation Road's End: The captured Sen'yu-Shō type submarine was scuttled by United States Navy forces in the East China Sea off Japan's Gotō Islands at 32°37′N 129°17′E.
Ha-106	Imperial Japanese Navy	Operation Road's End: The captured Sen'yu-Shō type submarine and the submarine I-36 (Imperial Japanese Navy), lashed alongside, were sunk by United States Navy demolition charges in the East China Sea off Japan's Gotō Islands at 32°37′N 129°17′E.
Ha-107	Imperial Japanese Navy	Operation Road's End: The captured Sen'yu-Shō type submarine was scuttled by United States Navy forces in the East China Sea off Japan's Gotō Islands at 32°37′N 129°17′E.
Ha-108	Imperial Japanese Navy	Operation Road's End: The captured Sen'yu-Shō type submarine was scuttled by United States Navy forces in the East China Sea off Japan's Gotō Islands at 32°37′N 129°17′E.
Ha-109	Imperial Japanese Navy	Operation Road's End: The captured Sen'yu-Shō type submarine was scuttled by United States Navy forces in the East China Sea off Japan's Gotō Islands at 32°37′N 129°17′E.
Ha-111	Imperial Japanese Navy	Operation Road's End: The captured Sen'yu-Shō type submarine was scuttled by United States Navy forces in the East China Sea off Japan's Gotō Islands at 32°37′N 129°17′E.
Ha-201	Imperial Japanese Navy	Operation Road's End: The captured Sentaka-Shō type submarine was sunk as a gunnery target along with the submarine I-401 (Imperial Japanese Navy), lashed alongside, by the destroyers USS Everett F. Larson and USS Goodrich (both United States Navy) in the East China Sea 16 nautical miles (30 km) due east of Kinai Island in Japan's Gotō Islands at 32°37′N 129°17′E.
Ha-202	Imperial Japanese Navy	Operation Road's End: The captured Sentaka-Shō type submarine was scuttled by United States Navy forces in the East China Sea off Japan's Gotō Islands at 32°37′N 129°17′E.
Ha-203	Imperial Japanese Navy	Operation Road's End: The captured Sentaka-Shō type submarine was scuttled by United States Navy forces in the East China Sea off Japan's Gotō Islands at 32°37′N 129°17′E.
Ha-208	Imperial Japanese Navy	Operation Road's End: The captured Sentaka-Shō type submarine was scuttled by United States Navy forces in the East China Sea off Japan's Gotō Islands at 32°37′N 129°17′E.
I-36	Imperial Japanese Navy	Operation Road's End: The captured Junsen Type B1 submarine and the submarine Ha-106 (Imperial Japanese Navy), lashed alongside, were sunk by United States Navy demolition charges in the East China Sea off Japan's Gotō Islands.
I-47	Imperial Japanese Navy	Operation Road's End: The captured Junsen Type B2 submarine was sunk by the United States Navy forces in the East China Sea off Japan's Gotō Islands.
I-53	Imperial Japanese Navy	Operation Road's End: The captured Junsen Type C3 submarine was sunk by gunfire by the submarine tender USS Nereus (United States Navy) in the East China Sea off Japan's Gotō Islands at 32°37′N 129°17′E.
I-58	Imperial Japanese Navy	Operation Road's End: The captured Junsen Type B3 submarine was sunk by gunfire by the submarine tender USS Nereus (United States Navy) in the East China Sea off Japan's Gotō Islands at 32°37′N 129°17′E.
I-156	Imperial Japanese Navy	Operation Road's End: The captured Kaidai-type cruiser submarine was sunk by gunfire by the submarine tender USS Nereus (United States Navy) in the East China Sea off Japan's Gotō Islands at 32°37′N 129°17′E.
I-157	Imperial Japanese Navy	Operation Road's End: The captured Kaidai-type cruiser submarine was sunk by gunfire by the submarine tender USS Nereus (United States Navy) in the East China Sea off Japan's Gotō Islands at 32°37′N 129°17′E.
I-158	Imperial Japanese Navy	Operation Road's End: The captured Kaidai-type cruiser submarine was sunk by aerial bombing by the United States Navy in the East China Sea off Japan's Gotō Islands at 32°37′N 129°17′E.
I-159	Imperial Japanese Navy	Operation Road's End: The captured Kaidai-type cruiser submarine was sunk by gunfire by the submarine tender USS Nereus (United States Navy) in the East China Sea off Japan's Gotō Islands at 32°37′N 129°17′E.
I-162	Imperial Japanese Navy	Operation Road's End: The captured Kaidai-type cruiser submarine was sunk by gunfire by the submarine tender USS Nereus (United States Navy) in the East China Sea off Japan's Gotō Islands at 32°37′N 129°17′E.
I-366	Imperial Japanese Navy	Operation Road's End: The captured Type D1 submarine was sunk by United States Navy demolition charges in the East China Sea off Japan's Gotō Islands.
I-367	Imperial Japanese Navy	Operation Road's End: The captured Type D1 submarine was sunk by a United States Navy demolition charge in the East China Sea off Japan's Gotō Islands.
I-402	Imperial Japanese Navy	Operation Road's End: The captured I-400-class submarine was sunk as a gunnery target along with the submarine Ha-201 (Imperial Japanese Navy), lashed alongside, by the destroyers USS Everett F. Larson and USS Goodrich (both United States Navy) in the East China Sea 16 nautical miles (30 km) due east of Kinai Island in Japan's Gotō Islands at 32°37′N 129°17′E.
Kontum	France	The 262.8-foot (80.1 m), 1,565-ton cargo vessel struck a naval mine, broke in two and sank off Vũng Tàu, Cap St. Jacques, French Indochina.
Ro-50	Imperial Japanese Navy	Operation Road's End: The captured Kaichū VI type submarine was sunk by a United States Navy forces in the East China Sea 16 nautical miles (30 km) due east of Kinai Island in Japan's Gotō Islands.

=== 2 April ===
List of shipwrecks: 2 April 1946
Ship	State	Description
Charles S. Haight	United States	The 7,198-gross register ton Liberty ship was stranded on Flat Ground Shoal at Cape Ann off Rockport, Massachusetts. The ship burned out on 17 August and sank in up to 30 feet (9.1 m) of water at 42°40′38″N 070°35′03″W.

=== 4 April ===
List of shipwrecks: 4 April 1946
Ship	State	Description
USS S-35	United States Navy	The decommissioned S-class submarine was sunk as a torpedo target.

=== 5 April ===
List of shipwrecks: 5 April 1946
Ship	State	Description
Ha-207	Imperial Japanese Navy	The captured Sentaka-Shō type submarine was scuttled by the United States Navy in the East China Sea off Sasebo Bay.
Ha-210	Imperial Japanese Navy	The captured Sentaka-Shō type submarine was scuttled by the United States Navy in the East China Sea off Sasebo Bay.
Ha-215	Imperial Japanese Navy	The incomplete captured Sentaka-Shō type submarine was scuttled by the United States Navy in the East China Sea off Sasebo Bay.
Ha-216	Imperial Japanese Navy	The captured Sentaka-Shō type submarine was scuttled by the United States Navy in the East China Sea off Sasebo Bay.
Ha-217	Imperial Japanese Navy	The incomplete captured Sentaka-Shō type submarine was scuttled by the United States Navy in the East China Sea off Sasebo Bay.
Ha-219	Imperial Japanese Navy	The incomplete captured Sentaka-Shō type submarine was scuttled by the United States Navy in the East China Sea off Sasebo Bay.
Ha-228	Imperial Japanese Navy	The incomplete captured Sentaka-Shō type submarine was scuttled by the United States Navy in the East China Sea off Sasebo Bay.
I-202	Imperial Japanese Navy	The captured I-201-class submarine was scuttled by the United States Navy in the East China Sea off Japan's Gotō Islands, 13 nautical miles (15 mi; 24 km) off Kongō Point.
Ro-31	Imperial Japanese Navy	The captured Kaichū V-type submarine was scuttled by the United States Navy in the East China Sea off Sasebo Bay.

=== 8 April ===
List of shipwrecks: 8 April 1946
Ship	State	Description
USS Despatch	United States Navy	The former protected cruiser was scuttled in the Pacific Ocean off San Francisco, California.

=== 9 April ===
List of shipwrecks: 9 April 1946
Ship	State	Description
Empire Bridge	United Kingdom	The coaster collided with the wreck of Fort Massac (United Kingdom) during salvage operations. She was holed and quickly sank in an upright position. A salvage attempt on 23 August only succeeded in turning her on her side, and she was declared a total loss.

=== 14 April ===
List of shipwrecks: 14 April 1946
Ship	State	Description
RFA Oligarch	Royal Navy	The Ol-class tanker was scuttled in the Red Sea (27°30′N 34°45′E) with a cargo of obsolete chemical ammunition.

=== 15 April ===
List of shipwrecks: 15 April 1946
Ship	State	Description
Ha-110	Imperial Japanese Navy	The captured Sen'yu-Shō type submarine possibly was scuttled in the Pacific Ocean off the Kii Channel. (Some sources claim she was scrapped rather than scuttled.)
Ha-112	Imperial Japanese Navy	The captured Sen'yu-Shō type submarine possibly was scuttled in the Pacific Ocean off the Kii Channel. (Some sources claim she was scrapped rather than scuttled.)

=== 16 April ===
List of shipwrecks: 16 April 1946
Ship	State	Description
Helen May	Norway	The cargo ship ran aground in the Krakhellesundet whilst on a voyage from Bergen to Ålesund, Norway.
I-503	Imperial Japanese Navy	The Marcello-class submarine was scuttled in the Inland Sea off Kobe, Japan by the United States Navy.
I-504	Imperial Japanese Navy	The Marconi-class submarine was scuttled in the Kii Channel by the United States Navy.

=== 17 April ===
List of shipwrecks: 17 April 1946
Ship	State	Description
Frithjof	Norway	The fishing boat sprang a leak and sank in the West Ice off Greenland.
USS Wasp	United States Navy	The Essex-class aircraft carrier ran aground off the coast of New Jersey.

=== 21 April ===
List of shipwrecks: 21 April 1946
Ship	State	Description
Empire Christopher	United Kingdom	The tugboat struck a mine and sank in the Gulf of Martaban (14°09′N 98°03′E). She was on a voyage from Rangoon, Burma to Singapore.
Ramø	Norway	World War II: The cargo ship struck a mine and sank at Henningsvær, Lofoten Islands, Norway.

=== 24 April ===
List of shipwrecks: 24 April 1946
Ship	State	Description
Alfios	Greece	The cargo ship ran aground on Sable Island, Nova Scotia, Canada. Her crew were rescued by HMCS Middlesex (Royal Canadian Navy).
Earl of Essex	United Kingdom	The 117.1-foot (35.7 m) steam trawler was sunk when a mine came up in her nets and exploded. Ten crew killed, one survivor rescued by "Vera Grace" (United Kingdom).
USS YP-280	United States Navy	The naval trawler sank near Saipan.

=== 26 April ===
List of shipwrecks: 26 April 1946
Ship	State	Description
Warrigal	United States	The 9-gross register ton, 30.8-foot (9.4 m) fishing vessel was stranded and lost at the southwest end of Chichagof Pass in the Alexander Archipelago in Southeast Alaska.

=== 28 April ===
List of shipwrecks: 28 April 1946
Ship	State	Description
Thea	Netherlands	The coaster capsized and sank in Bridlington Bay, United Kingdom with the loss of two of the eight people on board.

=== 30 April ===
List of shipwrecks: 30 April 1946
Ship	State	Description
Craigmillar	United Kingdom	The 121.3-foot (37.0 m), 201-ton trawler was damaged by an explosion, probably a mine in her nets 30 miles (48 km) northeast of Galley Head, County Cork, Ireland, and foundered 29 miles (47 km) southwest of Galley Head.
Georgetown Victory	United States	The troopship ran aground in the entrance to Strangford Lough, County Down, Northern Ireland, at 54°18′45″N 5°31′15″W and broke her back. All 1,100-plus on board were rescued by the Claughey, Donaghadee, and Newcastle lifeboats.
I-121	Imperial Japanese Navy	The captured I-121-class submarine was scuttled in Wakasa Bay off Maizuru, Japan, by the United States Navy.
Ro-68	Imperial Japanese Navy	The captured Type L4 submarine was scuttled in Wakasa Bay off Maizuru, Japan, by the United States Navy.
Ro-500	Imperial Japanese Navy	The captured Type IXC submarine was scuttled in Wakasa Bay off Maizuru, Japan, by the United States Navy.
USS Solar	United States Navy	The sonar test vessel, a former Buckley-class destroyer escort exploded and sank at Naval Ammunition Depot Earle, New Jersey, with the loss of seven of her 213 crew, with 125 injured.
HMS Stubborn	Royal Navy	The S-class submarine was sunk as a target in the Mediterranean Sea off Malta.
HMAS Tolga	Royal Australian Navy	The decommissioned auxiliary minesweeper was scuttled off the north coast of New Guinea.

=== Unknown date ===
List of shipwrecks: Unknown April 1946
Ship	State	Description
SS-16	Imperial Japanese Army	The surrendered SS-class landing ship sank at Yohimi. Raised and scrapped.

== May ==
=== 1 May ===
List of shipwrecks: 1 May 1946
Ship	State	Description
HMS Tarantula	Royal Navy	The decommissioned Insect-class river gunboat was sunk as a gunnery target in the Bay of Bengal off Trincomalee, Ceylon, by the destroyers HMS Carron and HMS Carysfort (both Royal Navy).

=== 2 May ===
List of shipwrecks: 2 May 1946
Ship	State	Description
S 7	Royal Navy	The surrendered S 7-class motor torpedo boat was scuttled.
S 9	United States Navy	The surrendered S 7-class motor torpedo boat was scuttled.
S 12	United States Navy	The surrendered S 10-class motor torpedo boat was scuttled.

=== 6 May ===
List of shipwrecks: 6 May 1946
Ship	State	Description
Ha-206	Imperial Japanese Navy	The wreck of the incomplete Sentaka-Shō type submarine – refloated in April 1946 after sinking in a typhoon in August 1945 – was scuttled in the Pacific Ocean off the Kii Channel. The wreck again was refloated in 1952 and scrapped.
USS LST-884	United States Navy	The LST-542-class tank landing ship, heavily damaged by a kamikaze on 1 April 1945, was disposed of by sinking.

=== 8 May ===
List of shipwrecks: 8 May 1946
Ship	State	Description
HMS Diomede	Royal Navy	Whilst on tow and sheltering in Mount's Bay from an easterly gale, the Danae-class cruiser drifted onto the Larrigan, rocks and stranded at low tide. Refloated several hours later she continued on her journey from Falmouth to the Clyde for scrapping.
Ha-205	Imperial Japanese Navy	Operation Bottom: The captured Sentaka-Shō type submarine was sunk by gunfire by the destroyer HMAS Quiberon (Royal Australian Navy) and the sloop-of-war HMIS Sutlej (Royal Indian Navy) in the Inland Sea.
I-153	Imperial Japanese Navy	Operation Bottom: The captured Kaidai-type was sunk by gunfire by the destroyer HMAS Quiberon (Royal Australian Navy) and the sloop-of-war HMIS Sutlej (Royal Indian Navy) in the Inland Sea. (Some sources say she was scrapped rather than sunk.)
I-154	Imperial Japanese Navy	Operation Bottom: The captured Kaidai-type was sunk by gunfire by the destroyer HMAS Quiberon (Royal Australian Navy) and the sloop-of-war HMIS Sutlej (Royal Indian Navy) in the Inland Sea.
I-155	Imperial Japanese Navy	Operation Bottom: The captured Kaidai-type was sunk by gunfire by the destroyer HMAS Quiberon (Royal Australian Navy) and the sloop-of-war HMIS Sutlej (Royal Indian Navy) in the Inland Sea.
Ro-59	Imperial Japanese Navy	Operation Bottom: The captured Type L3 submarine was sunk by gunfire by the destroyer HMAS Quiberon (Royal Australian Navy) and the sloop-of-war HMIS Sutlej (Royal Indian Navy) in the Inland Sea.
Ro-62	Imperial Japanese Navy	Operation Bottom: The captured Type L4 submarine was sunk by gunfire by the destroyer HMAS Quiberon (Royal Australian Navy) and the sloop-of-war HMIS Sutlej (Royal Indian Navy) in the Inland Sea.
Ro-63	Imperial Japanese Navy	Operation Bottom: The captured Type L4 submarine was sunk by gunfire by the destroyer HMAS Quiberon (Royal Australian Navy) and the sloop-of-war HMIS Sutlej (Royal Indian Navy) in the Inland Sea.

=== 9 May ===
List of shipwrecks: 9 May 1946
Ship	State	Description
K F C No 1	United States	The 125-gross register ton barge sank at Point Gore (59°12′00″N 150°57′30″W) on the south-central coast of the Territory of Alaska.

=== 10 May ===
List of shipwrecks: 10 May 1946
Ship	State	Description
Fort Sumter	United States	The T2 tanker broke in two and sank in the Pacific Ocean 720 nautical miles (1,330 km) south of Attu Island, Alaska. She was on a voyage from Yokohama, Japan to San Pedro.
H I C 5	United States	The 51-gross register ton, 60.1-foot (18.3 m) scow sank in Excursion Inlet (58°25′N 135°26′W) in Southeast Alaska.

=== 14 May ===
List of shipwrecks: 18 May 1946
Ship	State	Description
USS Bellona	United States Navy	The Achelous-class landing craft repair ship, hard aground on Kama Rock, Iwo Jima, since 1 December 1945, was blown up with explosive charges after being stripped of all salvageable equipment.
James Rumsey	United States	The Liberty ship ran aground at San Salvador (27°00′N 77°30′W). She was on a voyage from Savannah, Georgia to Santos, Brazil. She was refloated and towed to Mayport, Florida. Declared a constructive total loss, she was scrapped in 1947.

=== 17 May ===
List of shipwrecks: 17 May 1946
Ship	State	Description
Dessau	United Kingdom	The cargo ship was scuttled in the North Sea with a cargo of obsolete chemical ammunition.

=== 18 May ===
List of shipwrecks: 18 May 1946
Ship	State	Description
M-16	Germany	The minesweeper was scuttled at 58°10′N 10°42′E in the Skagerrak.

=== 21 May ===
List of shipwrecks: 21 May 1946
Ship	State	Description
I-203	Imperial Japanese Navy	The captured I-201-class submarine was sunk as a target in the Pacific Ocean off Pearl Harbor, Hawaii, at 21°13′N 158°08′W by a Mark 18-2 torpedo fired by the submarine USS Caiman (United States Navy).

=== 23 May ===
List of shipwrecks: 23 May 1946
Ship	State	Description
I-201	Imperial Japanese Navy	The captured I-201-class submarine was sunk as a target in the Pacific Ocean off Pearl Harbor, Hawaii, at 21°13′N 158°08′W by a Mark 18-2 torpedo fired by the submarine USS Queenfish (United States Navy).

=== 24 May ===
List of shipwrecks: 24 May 1946
Ship	State	Description
DD-224	United States Navy	DD-224 sinking. The decommissioned Clemson-class destroyer, formerly USS Stewart, was sunk as a target by aircraft in the Pacific Ocean off San Francisco, California.

=== 25 May ===
List of shipwrecks: 25 May 1946
Ship	State	Description
Alcoa Banner	United States	World War II: The cargo ship was scuttled in the North Sea with a cargo of obsolete chemical ammunition.
HMS Lewes	Royal Navy	The decommissioned Caldwell-class destroyer, formerly USS Craven and USS Conway (United States Navy), was scuttled in the Tasman Sea off Sydney, Australia.

=== 26 May ===
List of shipwrecks: 26 May 1946
Ship	State	Description
H.C. Horn	Germany	The cargo ship was scuttled in the Baltic Sea.

=== 28 May ===
List of shipwrecks: 28 May 1946
Ship	State	Description
I-14	Imperial Japanese Navy	The captured Type A Mod.2 submarine was sunk as a target in the Pacific Ocean off Oahu, Hawaii, at 21°13′N 158°08′W by torpedoes fired by the submarine USS Bugara (United States Navy).
Marianne	Denmark	The cargo ship struck a mine and sank in the Øresund off Stevns.

=== 29 May ===
List of shipwrecks: 29 May 1946
Ship	State	Description
Victoria II	United Kingdom	The 39.6-foot (12.1 m) fishing smack was sunk in a collision with tug "Carlgarth" (United Kingdom) 16 miles north northeast of the Bar Lightship in thick fog. Her Skipper and 2 crew died, one survivor.

=== 31 May ===
List of shipwrecks: 31 May 1946
Ship	State	Description
I-401	Imperial Japanese Navy	The captured I-400-class submarine was sunk as a target in the Pacific Ocean off Pearl Harbor, Hawaii, at 21°12′N 158°07′W by two Mark 18 torpedoes fired by the submarine USS Cabezon (United States Navy).
Spartan	United Kingdom	The Clyde Puffer exploded and sank off Lismore, Argyllshire.

=== Unknown date ===
List of shipwrecks: unknown 1946
Ship	State	Description
F 192	Kriegsmarine	World War II: The Type AM minelayer Marinefahrprahm was scuttled sometime in May.
Nattie	United States	The 10-gross register ton, 32-foot (9.8 m) fishing vessel drifted out to sea from Seldovia, Territory of Alaska, and was wrecked.

== June ==
=== 3 June ===
List of shipwrecks: 3 June 1946
Ship	State	Description
James W. Nesmith	United States	The Liberty ship was scuttled at sea with a cargo of obsolete ammunition.

=== 4 June ===
List of shipwrecks: 4 June 1946
Ship	State	Description
I-400	Imperial Japanese Navy	The captured I-400-class submarine was sunk as a target in the Pacific Ocean off Pearl Harbor, Territory of Hawaii, at 21°13′N 158°07′W by three Mark 18-2 torpedoes fired by the submarine USS Trumpetfish (United States Navy).
Kunashiri	Imperial Japanese Navy	The Shimushu-class escort ship ran aground and was wrecked on the coast of Japan.

=== 6 June ===
List of shipwrecks: 6 June 1946
Ship	State	Description
Jan Wellem	Germany	The tanker was wrecked in the Kiel Fjord, Germany. Scrapped at Blyth, United Kingdom, from November 1947.

=== 7 June ===
List of shipwrecks: 7 June 1946
Ship	State	Description
Kamikaze	Japan	The repatriation ship, a former Kamikaze-class destroyer, ran aground off Cape Omaezaki, Omaezaki, Shizuoka Prefecture, Japan, at 34°38′N 138°8′E while coming to the aide of Kunashiri (Japan) and was declared a constructive total loss.
Kunashiri	Japan	The repatriation ship, a former Shimushu-class escort, ran aground off Cape Omaezaki, Omaezaki, Shizuoka Prefecture, Japan, at (34°35′N 138°5′E). She was abandoned and scrapped 1946–1947.

=== 8 June ===
List of shipwrecks: 8 June 1946
Ship	State	Description
AF 112	Kriegsmarine	The surrendered Type D Artilleriefährprahm sank on this date.
Myōkō	Imperial Japanese Navy	The captured Myōkō-class heavy cruiser was scuttled by British forces in the Strait of Malacca off Port Swettenham, Malaya, at 03°05′N 100°40′E.

=== 9 June ===
List of shipwrecks: 9 June 1946
Ship	State	Description
USS Solar	United States Navy	The Buckley-class destroyer escort was scuttled 100 nautical miles (190 km) off New York.

=== 13 June ===
List of shipwrecks: 13 June 1946
Ship	State	Description
Fechenheim	Allied-occupied Germany	The cargo ship was scuttled off Arendal, Norway with a cargo of obsolete chemical ammunition.

=== 16 June ===
List of shipwrecks: 16 June 1946
Ship	State	Description
Meerkerk	Netherlands	The ship struck a mine off Westkapelle, Netherlands. 12 crew jumped overboard and were drowned. The remainder, including 14 passengers, were rescued. The ship sank on 18 June.

=== 18 June ===
List of shipwrecks: 18 June 1946
Ship	State	Description
Hugh Williamson	United States	The Liberty ship was driven ashore at Pernambuco, Brazil. She was later refloated and laid up. Consequently scrapped in 1946.
Wafico No. 8	United States	The 8-gross register ton, 30.9-foot (9.4 m) fishing vessel was destroyed by fire in Halibut Bay on the southwest end of Kodiak Island in the Territory of Alaska.

=== 19 June ===
List of shipwrecks: 19 June 1946
Ship	State	Description
James McNeill Whistler	United States	The Liberty ship ran aground at Meshima, 90 nautical miles (170 km) south west of Nagasaki, Japan. She was on a voyage from Shanghai, China to a Japanese port. All 3,400 people on board were resched. She was declared a total loss.

=== 20 June ===
List of shipwrecks: 20 June 1946
Ship	State	Description
Oderstrom	Germany	The cargo ship was scuttled in the Skagerrak.

=== 25 June ===
List of shipwrecks: 25 June 1946
Ship	State	Description
Gold Creek	United States	The T2 tanker ran aground off Martha's Vineyard, Massachusetts, and was severely damaged. She was on a voyage from Houston, Texas, to Providence, Rhode Island.

=== 27 June ===
List of shipwrecks: 27 June 1946
Ship	State	Description
C-4	Spanish Navy	The C-class submarine was rammed accidentally by the destroyer Lepanto (Spanish Navy) and sank in the Mediterranean Sea off Sóller on Mallorca in the Balearic Islands with the loss of all 44 crew.

=== 28 June ===
List of shipwrecks: 28 June 1946
Ship	State	Description
Miss D	United States	The 23-gross register ton, 49.9-foot (15.2 m) fishing vessel was destroyed by fire at Anchorage, Territory of Alaska.

=== Unknown date ===
List of shipwrecks: Unknown date 1946
Ship	State	Description
Flowergate	United Kingdom	The ship ran aground on Porthminster Beach, St. Ives whilst under tow to breakers yard. Later refloated and continued her journey.
James W. Nesmith	United States	The Liberty ship was scuttled in the North Sea with a cargo of obsolete chemical munitions.

== July ==
=== 1 July ===
List of shipwrecks: 1 July 1946
Ship	State	Description
USS Anderson	United States Navy	The atomic bomb explosion of 1 July 1946. Operation Crossroads: The decommissioned Sims-class destroyer was sunk as a target by an atomic bomb at Bikini Atoll.
USS Carlisle	United States Navy	Operation Crossroads: The decommissioned Gilliam-class attack transport was sunk as a target by an atomic bomb at Bikini Atoll.
USS Gilliam	United States Navy	Operation Crossroads: The decommissioned Gilliam-class attack transport was sunk as a target by an atomic bomb at Bikini Atoll.
USS Lamson	United States Navy	Operation Crossroads: The decommissioned Mahan-class destroyer was sunk as a target by an atomic bomb at Bikini Atoll.
Sakawa	United States Navy	Operation Crossroads: The captured Agano-class light cruiser (Imperial Japanese Navy) was sunk as a target by an atomic bomb at Bikini Atoll.

=== 2 July ===
List of shipwrecks: 2 July 1946
Ship	State	Description
Agnes	Norway	The cargo ship struck a mine and sank at Hai Phong, Vietnam. 15 crewmen killed.

=== 7 July ===
List of shipwrecks: 7 July 1946
Ship	State	Description
Kjeøy	Norway	Ran aground at Ytre Sula, Norway. Salvaged and found to be damaged beyond repair.

=== 9 July ===
List of shipwrecks: 9 July 1946
Ship	State	Description
YON-160	United States Navy	Operation Crossroads: The YOG-40 class fuel oil barge was holed by a "camel' below the water line and was beached on Enyu Island to be temporarily patched up. repaired and refloated.

=== 11 July ===
List of shipwrecks: 11 July 1946
Ship	State	Description
CH-5	Imperial Japanese Navy	The surrendered No.4-class submarine chaser was scuttled off Singapore by the Royal Navy.
Gemlock	United Kingdom	World War II: The cargo ship was scuttled in the Mediterranean Sea (31°44′N 30°25′E) with a cargo of obsolete ammunition.
Topdal	Norway	Sank whilst laid up at Bergen, Norway, after some boys opened her sea cocks.
W-4	Imperial Japanese Navy	The surrendered No.1-class minesweeper was scuttled off Singapore by the Royal Navy.

=== 12 July ===
List of shipwrecks: 12 July 1946
Ship	State	Description
Island Duke	United States	The 15-gross register ton 45.6-foot (13.9 m) motor towing vessel was wrecked off Graveyard Point (58°52′N 157°01′W) in Kvichak Bay on the Bristol Bay coast of the Territory of Alaska.

=== 13 July ===
List of shipwrecks: 13 July 1946
Ship	State	Description
Freiburg	Allied-occupied Germany	The cargo ship was scuttled in the Skagerrak with a cargo of obsolete chemical ammunition.
Gertrud Fritzen	Allied-occupied Germany	The cargo ship was scuttled in the Skagerrak as a means of disposing of poison gas munitions that had been loaded aboard her.

=== 14 July ===
List of shipwrecks: 14 July 1946
Ship	State	Description
USS Majaba	United States Navy	The decommissioned and abandoned non-self propelled auxiliary vessel sank at dock in Subic Bay, Philippines.
Somehow	United States	The 14-gross register ton, 33.3-foot (10.1 m) fishing vessel was destroyed by fire at Elfin Cove in Southeast Alaska.

=== 18 July ===
List of shipwrecks: 18 July 1946
Ship	State	Description
Denham	United Kingdom	The tender struck a mine and sank in Liverpool Bay.

=== 20 July ===
List of shipwrecks: 20 July 1946
Ship	State	Description
Z45	Germany	World War II: The incomplete Type 1936B destroyer was scuttled in the Skagerrak.

=== 22 July ===
List of shipwrecks: 22 July 1946
Ship	State	Description
Cougar	United States	The 43-gross register ton, 59.2-foot (18.0 m) fishing vessel sank in the Shelikof Strait 4 nautical miles (7.4 km; 4.6 mi) off Rocky Point (57°39′45″N 154°13′50″W) on the coast of Kodiak Island in the Territory of Alaska's Kodiak Archipelago with the loss of three crewmen and seven or eight passengers. The sole survivor was a man who clung to a floating gasoline tank for 11 hours until a passing fishing vessel rescued him.

=== 25 July ===
List of shipwrecks: 25 July 1946
Ship	State	Description
USS Apogon	United States Navy	Operation Crossroads: The decommissioned Balao-class submarine was sunk as a target by an atomic bomb at Bikini Atoll.
USS Arkansas	United States Navy	Operation Crossroads: The decommissioned Wyoming-class battleship was sunk as a target by an atomic bomb at Bikini Atoll.
USS LCM-4	United States Navy	Operation Crossroads:The decommissioned Landing Craft, Medium (given the designation LCM-4 for the test) was sunk as a target by an atomic bomb at Bikini Atoll.
USS LCT-1175	United States Navy	Operation Crossroads:The Landing Craft, Tank was sunk as a target by an atomic bomb at Bikini Atoll.
USS LCVP-10	United States Navy	Operation Crossroads:The decommissioned Landing Craft, Vehicles and Personnel (given the designation LCVP-10 for the test) was sunk as a target by an atomic bomb at Bikini Atoll.
USS LSM-60	United States Navy	The atomic explosion beneath LSM-60. Operation Crossroads: The decommissioned LSM-1-class medium landing ship disintegrated in the explosion of an atomic bomb suspended beneath her at Bikini Atoll during atomic bomb testing.
USS Pilotfish	United States Navy	Operation Crossroads: The decommissioned Balao-class submarine was sunk as a target by an atomic bomb at Bikini Atoll.
USS Saratoga	United States Navy	Operation Crossroads: The decommissioned Lexington-class aircraft carrier was sunk as a target by an atomic bomb at Bikini Atoll.
USS Skipjack	United States Navy	Operation Crossroads: The decommissioned Salmon-class submarine was sunk as a target by an atomic bomb at Bikini Atoll. She later was raised for further use as a target ship and sunk again in August 1948.
USS YON-160	United States Navy	Operation Crossroads: The YOG-40-class fuel oil barge was sunk as a target by an atomic bomb at Bikini Atoll.

=== 26 July ===
List of shipwrecks: 26 July 1946
Ship	State	Description
T37	Germany	The incomplete Type 1941 torpedo boat was scuttled by the United States as a means of disposing of chemical weapons that had been loaded aboard.
T38	Germany	The incomplete Type 1941 torpedo boat was scuttled by the United States as a means of disposing of chemical weapons that had been loaded aboard.
T39	Germany	The incomplete Type 1941 torpedo boat was scuttled by the United States as a means of disposing of chemical weapons that had been loaded aboard.
TF-11	Germany	The torpedo training ship, a former Type 1940 minesweeper, was scuttled in the Skagerrak by the Allies.

=== 27 July ===
List of shipwrecks: 27 July 1946
Ship	State	Description
Kanaga	United States	The 60-gross register ton, 61.6-foot (18.8 m) fishing vessel was wrecked in Southeast Alaska, 6 nautical miles (11 km; 6.9 mi) south of Sitka, Territory of Alaska.

=== 30 July ===
List of shipwrecks: 30 July 1946
Ship	State	Description
USS LCT-1114	United States Navy	The decommissioned Landing Craft, Tank was scuttled with demolition charges in the Pacific Ocean off Bikini Atoll, Marshall Islands, after capsizing as a target in the Operation Crossroads Baker Test atomic bomb test.
Nagato	United States Navy	Operation Crossroads: The captured Nagato-class battleship sank at Bikini Atoll due to damage sustained on 25 July 1946 as a test target in an atomic bomb explosion.
Vipya	Nyasaland	The sternwheel ferry capsized and sank in a storm while only on her fourth voyage on Lake Nyasa 7 nautical miles (13 km) near Florence Bay with the loss of 145 lives. The Malawi Department of Antiquities's sign at the Memorial site at Fort Johnston (now Mangochi) confirms the loss of life as being 145.

=== 31 July ===
List of shipwrecks: 31 July 1946
Ship	State	Description
American Farmer	United States	The cargo ship collided with William J. Riddle (United States) in the Atlantic Ocean and was severely damaged and abandoned. All passengers and crew rescued by William J. Riddle. American Farmer was initially reported to have sunk, but later reported to be still afloat.
Argyle	Canada	The cargo ship ran aground and was wrecked near Punta Gorda, Cuba while on passage from Baracoa for Miami with bananas.

=== Unknown date ===
List of shipwrecks: Unknown date in July 1946
Ship	State	Description
FS-172	United States Army	The Design 330 coastal freighter was wrecked off the north coast of New Guinea to the north of Madang two miles off Mugil Point near Cape Croisilles in 60–120 feet (18–37 m) of water.
Heinrich	United Kingdom	The cargo ship was scuttled in the Skaggerak with a cargo of obsolete chemical ammunition.
USS LCT-812	United States Navy	The decommissioned Landing Craft, Tank was scuttled with demolition charges in the Pacific Ocean off Bikini Atoll, Marshall Islands, shortly after use as a target in the Operation Crossroads atomic bomb tests of 1946.
USS LCT-1187	United States Navy	The decommissioned Landing Craft, Tank was scuttled with demolition charges in the Pacific Ocean off Bikini Atoll, Marshall Islands, sometime in July after use as a target in the Operation Crossroads atomic bomb tests.
USS LCT-1237	United States Navy	The decommissioned Landing Craft, Tank was scuttled with demolition charges in the Pacific Ocean off Bikini Atoll, Marshall Islands, sometime in July after use as a target in the Operation Crossroads atomic bomb tests.
Myōkō	Imperial Japanese Navy	The surrendered Myōkō-class cruiser was scuttled in the Straits of Malacca off Port Swettenham, Malaya (03°05′N 100°40′E) sometime between 2 and 8 July.
Patrick Henry	United States	The Liberty ship ran aground on a reef off the coast of Florida and was severely damaged.
Seishu Maru	Allied-occupied Japan	The crane ship ran aground in a typhoon near Hong Kong. Deemed a total loss and probably scrapped in situ.
Sperrbrecher 27 (H. C. Horn)	Germany	The Sperrbrecher was scuttled in the Skagerrak with poison gas shells sometime in July.

== August ==
=== 1 August ===
List of shipwrecks: 1 August 1946
Ship	State	Description
Peregrin	United States	The 13-gross register ton 34.3-foot (10.5 m) motor vessel was destroyed by fire at Naknek, Territory of Alaska.

=== 2 August ===
List of shipwrecks: 2 August 1946
Ship	State	Description
Empire Cross	United Kingdom	The Intermediate-type tanker caught fire, exploded, capsized and sank at Haifa, Palestine. Her crew were rescued by HMS Venus and HMS Virago (both Royal Navy). She was refloated in 1952 and scrapped.

=== 5 August ===
List of shipwrecks: 5 August 1946
Ship	State	Description
Homestead	United States	The T2 tanker was struck by lightning and burnt out at Jacksonville, Florida. Consequently scrapped.

=== 6 August ===
List of shipwrecks: 5 August 1946
Ship	State	Description
ARDC-13	United States Navy	Operation Crossroads: The concrete-hulled, 386-foot (118 m) ARDC-1-class floating dry dock capsized on 4 August from damage as a target by an atomic bomb at Bikini Atoll. She was scuttled with demolition charges on 6 August.

=== 7 August ===
List of shipwrecks: 7 August 1946
Ship	State	Description
Red Wing	United States	The 20-gross register ton, 44.6-foot (13.6 m) fishing vessel was wrecked at "Bent Point" – probably Bent Cape (54°53′30″N 162°25′00″W) – on Deer Island at the mouth of Cold Bay on the south side of the Alaska Peninsula in the Territory of Alaska.

=== 10 August ===
List of shipwrecks: 10 August 1946
Ship	State	Description
Adur II	United Kingdom	The tug capsized and sank off Hartland Point, Devon with the loss of one of her crew.
USS LCI(L)-620	United States Navy	The decommissioned Landing Craft, Infantry was scuttled in the Pacific Ocean off Bikini Atoll, Marshall Islands after use as a target in the Operation Crossroads atomic bomb tests.

=== 14 August ===
List of shipwrecks: 14 August 1946
Ship	State	Description
USS LST-125	United States Navy	The decommissioned Landing Ship, Tank was sunk in the Pacific Ocean off Bikini Atoll, Marshall Islands, by gunfire after use as a target in the Operation Crossroads atomic bomb tests of 1946.

=== 16 August ===
List of shipwrecks: 16 August 1946
Ship	State	Description
Finisterre	France	Fishing vessel driven ashore at St. Ives. Three crew killed.
Schuyler Colfax	United States	The Liberty ship ran aground in Hawaiian waters. She was refloated and laid up at Honolulu, Hawaii. Subsequently sunk as a target ship.

=== 20 August ===
List of shipwrecks: 20 August 1946
Ship	State	Description
Banshu Maru No. 3	Japan	The refrigerated cargo ship caught fire and was scuttled in Singapore Roads.

=== 22 August ===
List of shipwrecks: 22 August 1946
Ship	State	Description
Empire Rival	United Kingdom	The cargo ship was damaged at Haifa, Palestine by a limpet mine and was beached. She was later repaired and returned to service.

=== 25 August ===
List of shipwrecks: 25 August 1946
Ship	State	Description
Buccaneer	United Kingdom	The tug was accidentally shelled and sunk, while towing a target off the Isle of Portland, by HMS St James (Royal Navy). Her crew were rescued by HMS St James.
Empire Peacock	United Kingdom	The Design 1037 ship was scuttled in the Atlantic Ocean (47°55′N 8°30′W) with a cargo of obsolete chemical ammunition.

=== 27 August ===
List of shipwrecks: 27 August 1946
Ship	State	Description
Islay Mist	United Kingdom	The yacht was driven ashore at Freshwater, Isle of Wight. All six people on board were rescued by the Coastguard.
Unnamed	United Kingdom	The motor launch was driven ashore near Freshwater. Several people were rescued by breeches buoy.

=== 28 August ===
List of shipwrecks: 28 August 1946
Ship	State	Description
Devonbrook	United Kingdom	The coaster was driven ashore at Blyth, Northumberland. Her fifteen crew were rescued by the Blyth lifeboat.
James H. Price	United States	The Liberty ship was driven ashore at Deal, Kent, United Kingdom.
Ziska	United Kingdom	The yacht was abandoned off the Newcombe Sands, in the North Sea off the coast of Suffolk. All seven people on board were rescued by the Lowestoft Lifeboat. Ziska was on a voyage from Ostend, West Flanders, Belgium to Whitby, Yorkshire. The lifeboat towed her in to Lowestoft.

=== Unknown date ===
List of shipwrecks: Unknown date August 1946
Ship	State	Description
I-372	Imperial Japanese Navy	The refloated wreck of the Type D submarine was scuttled in the Pacific Ocean off the coast of Japan.

== September ==
=== 3 September ===
List of shipwrecks: 3 September 1946
Ship	State	Description
Empire Nutfield	United Kingdom	The cargo ship was scuttled in the Atlantic Ocean (48°03′N 8°09′W) with a cargo of obsolete chemical ammunition.
Fulani	United Kingdom	The cargo ship ran aground in the River Mersey at Liverpool, Lancashire. Refloated the next day.
Sea King	Norway	The cargo ship sank in the Trondheimsleia following a collision with another ship. Was on a voyage from Skrova to Trondheim, Norway.

=== 4 September ===
List of shipwrecks: 4 September 1946
Ship	State	Description
David Caldwell	United States	The Liberty ship ran aground 5 nautical miles (9.3 km) off the La Coubre Lighthouse, Charente-Maritime, France. She was on a voyage from the Hampton Roads, Virginia to Pauillac, Gironde, France. She broke in three and was a total loss.

=== 8 September ===
List of shipwrecks: 8 September 1946
Ship	State	Description
Rhön	United Kingdom	The cargo ship was scuttled 25 nautical miles (46 km) south of Arendal, Norway with a cargo of obsolete chemical ammunition.

=== 12 September ===
List of shipwrecks: 12 September 1946
Ship	State	Description
Fort Fraser	United Kingdom	The cargo ship ran aground at Paull, Yorkshire. Later refloated.
Helena Modjeska	United States	The cargo ship ran aground on the Goodwin Sands, Kent, United Kingdom. Later broke her back, a total loss.

=== 13 September ===
List of shipwrecks: 13 September 1946
Ship	State	Description
Marit II	Norway	The tanker broke in two off Cape Hatteras, North Carolina, United States (35°09′N 73°24′W) and sank with the loss of eleven crew.
S. Wiley Wakeman	United States	The Liberty ship ran aground on a wreck off Tobago. She was refloated on 22 September. Subsequently laid up, scrapped in 1948.

=== 15 September ===
List of shipwrecks: 15 September 1946
Ship	State	Description
Herøy	Norway	The cargo ship sprang a leak and sank west of the Feistein Lighthouse whilst on a voyage from Odda to Sarpsborg, Norway.

=== 18 September ===
List of shipwrecks: 18 September 1946
Ship	State	Description
USS YON-184	United States Navy	The YOG-40-class fuel oil barge sank in a typhoon at Eniwetok.

=== 19 September ===
List of shipwrecks: 19 September 1946
Ship	State	Description
Ohio	United Kingdom	Both halves of the tanker, which had broken in two in 1942 due to combat damage, were sunk as gunnery targets in the Mediterranean Sea off Malta.

=== 20 September ===
List of shipwrecks: 20 September 1946
Ship	State	Description
TID 62	United Kingdom	The tug suffered a failure of her steering gear off Beachy Head, Sussex. She was taken in tow by HMS Zephyr (Royal Navy) and anchored 5 nautical miles (9.3 km) south east of Folkestone, Kent where she later capsized and sank with the loss of a crewman. TID 62 was being towed from Portsmouth, Hampshire to Sheerness, Kent by HMS Tenacity (Royal Navy).

=== 23 September ===
List of shipwrecks: 23 September 1946
Ship	State	Description
USS YOG-83	United States Navy	The 375-foot (114 m), 5,410-ton, YOG-40-class oil barge was beached in the Pacific Ocean at Kwajalein Atoll, Marshall Islands after use as a target in the Operation Crossroads atomic bomb tests of 1946. Refloated in 1948.

=== 24 September ===
List of shipwrecks: 25 September 1946
Ship	State	Description
Bantam	Netherlands	World War II: The cargo ship was scuttled off the coast of New South Wales, Australia with a cargo of obsolete chemical ammunition.
RFA Green Ranger	Royal Navy	The Ranger-class tanker was torpedoed and damaged at Portland Harbour, Dorset.

=== 25 September ===
List of shipwrecks: 25 September 1946
Ship	State	Description
SS-22	Imperial Japanese Navy	The T-class landing ship was wrecked near Chipei-Hsiaotao, Pescadore Islands.
T-20	Imperial Japanese Navy	The No.1-class landing ship ran aground in the Formosa Strait and was wrecked near Jibei Island, Penghu. Deemed a comprehensive total loss, she was abandoned there.

=== 29 September ===
List of shipwrecks: 29 September 1946
Ship	State	Description
Brigadier General M. G. Zalinski	United States Army	The transport ran aground and sank in the Grenville Channel, 1.3 miles (2.1 km) south west of James Point, British Columbia.
Fort Vermillion	United Kingdom	The cargo ship ran aground on the Goodwin Sands, Kent, United Kingdom. Refloated on 6 October.
Torni	United Kingdom	The cargo ship ran aground at Petard Point, Ravenscar, Yorkshire.

=== 30 September ===
List of shipwrecks: 30 September 1946
Ship	State	Description
Alta	Norway	The cargo ship sank off Makkaur, Norway. Raised in 1949 and converted to a barge in 1950.

=== Unknown date ===
List of shipwrecks: Unknown date 1946
Ship	State	Description
LCG(M) 132	Norway	The landing craft was driven ashore whilst under tow from Inveraray, Argyllshire to Greenock, Renfrewshire, United Kingdom and was a total loss.
Schuyler Colfax	United States	The Liberty ship was sunk as a target in the Pacific Ocean by USS Tilefish (United States Navy).

== October ==
=== 1 October ===
List of shipwrecks: 1 October 1946
Ship	State	Description
June	United States	The 20-gross register ton, 43.2-foot (13.2 m) motor cargo vessel sank in Yakutat Bay on the south-central coast of the Territory of Alaska.

=== 10 October ===
List of shipwrecks: 10 October 1946
Ship	State	Description
Fluor	United Kingdom	The coaster was struck by Strathnaver (United Kingdom) whilst moored at Southampton, Hampshire and sank. All twelve crew escaped.

=== 11 October ===
List of shipwrecks: 11 October 1946
Ship	State	Description
Glamorganbrook	United Kingdom	The coaster sprang a leak and sank off Scarborough, Yorkshire with the loss of one of the fifteen people on board. She was on a voyage from Blyth, Northumberland to Cowes, Isle of Wight.

=== 12 October ===
List of shipwrecks: 12 October 1946
Ship	State	Description
Arthur Sewall	United States	The Liberty ship was scuttled with a cargo of obsolete chemical ammunition.
Empire Severn	United Kingdom	The cargo ship was scuttled north west of the Hebrides (58°18′N 9°37′E) with a cargo of obsolete chemical ammunition.
Ludwigshafen	Allied-occupied Germany	The cargo ship was scuttled in the Skagerrak.

=== 14 October ===
List of shipwrecks: 14 October 1946
Ship	State	Description
Eider	Allied-occupied Germany	The former (hulked) cargo ship was scuttled in the Skagerrak with a cargo of obsolete chemical ammunition.

=== 16 October ===
List of shipwrecks: 16 October 1946
Ship	State	Description
Cassius Hudson	United States	The Liberty ship struck a mine in the Gulf of Trieste (45°32′N 13°12′E) whilst on a voyage from the Hampton Roads, Virginia to Venice, Italy. She was taken in tow, but struck another mine and sank.

=== 17 October ===
List of shipwrecks: 17 October 1946
Ship	State	Description
HMAS Waree	Royal Australian Navy	The tug was run aground near the mouth of the Clarence River at Yamba, New South Wales, Australia, after beginning to take on water. She was declared a total loss.

=== 22 October ===
List of shipwrecks: 22 October 1946
Ship	State	Description
HMS Saumarez	Royal Navy	Corfu Channel Incident: The S-class destroyer suffered heavy damage when she struck a mine in the Corfu Channel which blew her bow off. Eleven of her crew were killed and 25 others were listed as missing and presumed dead. She returned to base stern-first. She was declared a total loss and scrapped.
HMS Volage	Royal Navy	Corfu Channel Incident: The V-class destroyer suffered heavy damage when she struck a mine in the Corfu Channel which blew her bow off while she was attempting to tow HMS Saumarez (Royal Navy) to safety. One of her crew was killed and seven others were listed as missing and presumed dead. She returned to base stern-first. She was eventually repaired and returned to service.

=== 24 October ===
List of shipwrecks: 24 October 1946
Ship	State	Description
Bakkøy	Norway	The cargo ship ran aground east of Lindesnes Lighthouse whilst on a voyage from Korshamn to Oslo, Norway.

=== 26 October ===
List of shipwrecks: 26 October 1946
Ship	State	Description
Arthur Sewall	United States	The Liberty ship was scuttled in the North Sea with a cargo of obsolete chemical ammunition.

=== 28 October ===
List of shipwrecks: 28 October 1946
Ship	State	Description
Renascent	Norway	The 85.7-foot (26.1 m), 100-ton trawler sprang a leak in rough seas and sank in the North Sea 70-90 miles east northeast from Lowestoft. All four crew were rescued by trawler "Grackle" (United Kingdom). The Shipwrecked Fishermen and Mariners' Royal Benevolent Society awarded the Emile Robin Award for seamanship to Grackle's Captain and Second Hand for the rescue.

=== 29 October ===
List of shipwrecks: 29 October 1946
Ship	State	Description
Stanburn	United Kingdom	The cargo ship foundered off Sfax, Tunisia with the loss of four of her 35 crew.
Takao	Imperial Japanese Navy	The surrendered Takao-class heavy cruiser was scuttled by British forces in the Strait of Malacca off Port Swettenham, Malaya, at 03°05′N 100°41′E, by opening sea cocks, planting explosives and shelling by HMS Newfoundland (Royal Navy).

=== Unknown date ===
List of shipwrecks: Unknown date 1946
Ship	State	Description
George Hawley	United States	The Liberty ship was scuttled with a cargo of obsolete chemical ammunition.

== November ==
=== 2 November ===
List of shipwrecks: 2 November 1946
Ship	State	Description
Empire Woodlark	United Kingdom	The troopship was scuttled in the Atlantic Ocean north of the Hebrides (59°00′N 7°40′W) with a cargo of obsolete chemical ammunition.
Gyoraitei No. 222	Imperial Japanese Navy	The surrendered Gyoraitei No. 31-class motor torpedo boat was lost on this date.
Tora	Norway	The cargo ship sprang a leak and sank in the Åland Sea west of Almagrundet, Sweden whilst on a voyage from Kotka, Finland to Stavanger, Norway.

=== 3 November ===
List of shipwrecks: 3 November 1946
Ship	State	Description
A T T No. 1	United States	The 3,577-gross register ton, 314.8-foot (96.0 m) barge was wrecked on the northeast coast of Amukta in the Aleutian Islands.

=== 4 November ===
List of shipwrecks: 4 November 1946
Ship	State	Description
Gulli	Norway	The motor vessel ran aground at Kragerø, Norway.

=== 5 November ===
List of shipwrecks: 5 November 1946
Ship	State	Description
HMT Lundy	Royal Navy	The naval trawler was sunk by the explosion of a depth charge whilst engaged in an operation to disperse the wreck of Flandres (Belgium) off Deal, Kent. Four crew were killed and three were injured.
Valle	Norway	The coaster suffered engine failure and struck rocks whilst on a voyage from Grimstad to Haugesund, Norway.

=== 11 November ===
List of shipwrecks: 11 November 1946
Ship	State	Description
Empire Pitt	United Kingdom	The cargo ship ran aground in the English Channel off Berville-sur-Mer, Eure, France and broke her back. She was on a voyage from Rouen, Seine-Inférieure, France to the West Indies. She was declared a constructive total loss.

=== 13 November ===
List of shipwrecks: 13 November 1946
Ship	State	Description
U-977	United States Navy	The Type VIIC submarine was sunk as a torpedo target in the Atlantic Ocean off Massachusetts by the submarine USS Atule (United States Navy).

=== 14 November ===
List of shipwrecks: 13 November 1946
Ship	State	Description
Charmouth	United Kingdom	World War II: The trawler (195 GRT) was sunk by a mine off Ballycotton, County York, Ireland. Nine crew were killed. There were five survivors.

=== 16 November ===
List of shipwrecks: 16 November 1946
Ship	State	Description
Flying Cloud	United States	The 20-gross register ton, 41.2-foot (12.6 m) fishing vessel sank off Point Gardner (57°01′N 134°37′W) on the south end of Admiralty Island in the Alexander Archipelago in Southeast Alaska.

=== 19 November ===
List of shipwrecks: 19 November 1946
Ship	State	Description
HNLMS Walcherin	Royal Netherlands Navy	The Duiveland-class minesweeper was sunk by a Japanese mine on 19 November 1946 near Balikpapan, Netherlands East Indies. Three crewmen were killed.

=== 20 November ===
List of shipwrecks: 20 November 1946
Ship	State	Description
Albany	United Kingdom	The coaster departed from Port Talbot, Glamorgan for Rosslare, County Wexford, Ireland. Presumed subsequently foundered with the loss of all hands; wreckage from the ship washed up near St. Davids Head, Pembrokeshire on 22 November.
Stormont	United Kingdom	The coaster was in collision with Empire Brent (United Kingdom) in the River Mersey and sank with the loss of 160 of the 210 cattle she was carrying.

=== 22 November ===
List of shipwrecks: 22 November 1946
Ship	State	Description
Hirma	Norway	The cargo ship ran aground west of the Geita Lighthouse, whilst on a voyage from Bergen to Bodø, Norway.

=== 26 November ===
List of shipwrecks: 26 November 1946
Ship	State	Description
Garth	United Kingdom	The dredger sank in the Bristol Channel with the loss of all six crew.

=== 27 November ===
List of shipwrecks: 27 November 1946
Ship	State	Description
Laksnes	Norway	The cargo ship ran aground off Rongevær, Norway, broke in two and sank. She was on a voyage from Brevik to Namsos.

=== 29 November ===
List of shipwrecks: 29 November 1946
Ship	State	Description
USS YON-161	United States Navy	The YOG-40 class fuel oil barge, described as a hulk, was destroyed at Eniwetok.

=== Unknown date ===
List of shipwrecks: Unknown date 1946
Ship	State	Description
Tillamok	United States	The tanker ran aground at Porthcawl, Glamorgan, United Kingdom. Still aground on 25 December.

== December ==
=== 1 December ===
List of shipwrecks: 1 December 1946
Ship	State	Description
Tillamook	United States	The tanker was driven ashore at Sker Point, Glamorgan, United Kingdom. She was refloated on 6 February 1947 and taken in to Swansea, Glamorgan.

=== 2 December ===
List of shipwrecks: 2 December 1946
Ship	State	Description
Blue Island Victory	United States	The Victory ship rammed the Drogden Lighthouse, Denmark and was severely damaged. She was on a voyage from the Hampton Roads, Virginia to Gdynia, Poland. She was taken in to Copenhagen for temporary repairs.
HMCS Middlesex	Royal Canadian Navy	The Algerine-class minesweeper ran aground on Shutin Island, Nova Scotia. She was subsequently scrapped in situ.

=== 5 December ===
List of shipwrecks: 5 December 1946
Ship	State	Description
Rubens	United Kingdom	The cargo ship was abandoned 50 nautical miles (93 km) north of Bonacca, Honduras. Drifted ashore at Bonacca, a total loss.

=== 6 December ===
List of shipwrecks: 6 December 1946
Ship	State	Description
N35	French Navy	The Type XXIII submarine was lost at Toulon, Var in a diving accident with the loss of 21 of lives.

=== 7 December ===
List of shipwrecks: 7 December 1946
Ship	State	Description
Rafiah		Aliyah Bet: The Jewish immigrant ship (formerly Athina S.) was wrecked on Sirina, north-east of Crete.
Sea It	United States	The 17-gross register ton, 45-foot (14 m) motor cargo vessel sank off Point Adolphus (58°17′15″N 135°47′00″W) in Southeast Alaska.

=== 8 December ===
List of shipwrecks: 8 December 1946
Ship	State	Description
Empire Eden	United Kingdom	The cargo ship ran aground at Spurn Head, Yorkshire in a gale, but was refloated.
Francis Batey	United Kingdom	The tug sank in the Tyne.
Irma	Sweden	The cargo ship was driven onto Manacle Rock, Cornwall, United Kingdom. Towed clear by Zwarte Zee (Netherlands).
Liberté	France	The ocean liner collided with the wreck of Paris (France) and sank at Le Havre. Later raised, repaired and returned to service.
HMS Saltburn	Royal Navy	The Hunt-class minesweeper broke free from her tow and ran aground at Hartland Point, Devon.
Security	United Kingdom	The tug sank off Portland, Dorset.
HMS Truant	Royal Navy	The T-class submarine broke free from her tow and sank off the Channel Islands.
Wansford	United Kingdom	The cargo ship ran aground at Falmouth, Cornwall. Towed clear by Zwarte Zee (Netherlands).

=== 10 December ===
List of shipwrecks: 10 December 1946
Ship	State	Description
Tana	Norway	The cargo ship foundered in the Mediterranean Sea (41°20′N 10°57′E). She was under tow from Olbia, Sardinia to Genoa, Italy.

=== 13 December ===
List of shipwrecks: 13 December 1946
Ship	State	Description
Tove	Norway	The coaster capsized and sank in the Kattegat whilst on a voyage from Randers to Bergen, Norway. One crewmember was killed.

=== 16 December ===
List of shipwrecks: 16 December 1946
Ship	State	Description
Leipzig	Royal Navy	The Leipzig-class light cruiser was scuttled in the North Sea with a cargo of obsolete chemical weapons.
T21	Germany	The torpedo boat was scuttled in the Skagerrak at 57°53′N 6°13′E.
Z29	Germany	The destroyer was scuttled in the Skagerrak.

=== 19 December ===
List of shipwrecks: 19 December 1946
Ship	State	Description
Havskaaren	Norway	The coaster ran aground at Kvalnesflæsa, Lofoten Islands, Norway.

=== 20 December ===
List of shipwrecks: 20 December 1946
Ship	State	Description
Chichagoff	United States	The 44-gross register ton, 57.3-foot (17.5 m) fishing vessel was abandoned off Khaz Head (57°31′45″N 136°01′00″W) off Piehle Passage (57.5275°N 136.0289°W) in Southeast Alaska after she lost rudder control and a breaker carried away her pilothouse. Her crew of three abandoned ship in a dory and survived, but Chichagoff sank.

=== 21 December ===
List of shipwrecks: 21 December 1946
Ship	State	Description
VIC 31	United Kingdom	The VIC-type lighter was driven ashore on Foul Point, Ceylon and sank. She was being towed from Colombo to Trincomalee. She was declared a constructive total loss but was salvaged in 1949, repaired and returned to service as Rahumani.

=== 22 December ===
List of shipwrecks: 22 December 1946
Ship	State	Description
Prinz Eugen	United States Navy	Operation Crossroads: The Admiral Hipper-class heavy cruiser capsized and sank at Kwajalein Atoll due to an unrepaired leak caused by damage when she was used as a target in atomic bomb tests at Bikini Atoll on 1 and 25 July 1946.

=== 23 December ===
List of shipwrecks: 23 December 1946
Ship	State	Description
Afognak	United States	The beam trawler ran hard aground 2 nautical miles (3.7 km; 2.3 mi) north of Point Gardner (57°01′N 134°37′W) in Southeast Alaska. The mail boat Yakobi (United States) rescued the eight people – Afognak's captain, his wife, and six crewmen – on board.
Marna	Norway	The coaster sank west of Gamle Hellesund, Norway, during a voyage from Gothenburg, Sweden, to Grangemouth, Scotland, United Kingdom.

=== 24 December ===
List of shipwrecks: 24 December 1946
Ship	State	Description
Northeastern Victory	United States	The Victory ship ran aground and sank, Goodwin Sands, Kent, United Kingdom.

=== 25 December ===
List of shipwrecks: 25 December 1946
Ship	State	Description
Anastasia	United Kingdom	The coaster sprang a leak and was beached at Skar Point, Walney Island, Lancashire.

=== 27 December ===
List of shipwrecks: 27 December 1946
Ship	State	Description
Am-Mer-Mar	United States	The Liberty ship ran aground off Lindesnes, Norway. She sank on 1 January 1947.
Thackeray	United Kingdom	The cargo ship ran aground off Outer Cat Island, Dominion of Newfoundland. She was on a voyage from the Hampton Roads, Virginia, United States to Botwood, Dominion of Newfoundland. She was refloated on 24 May 1947 and put in to Saint John's. Subsequently repaired and returned to service.

=== 30 December ===
List of shipwrecks: 30 December 1946
Ship	State	Description
F 2	Royal Navy	The F-class escort ship sank at Scapa Flow (58°50′N 03°11′E) during a storm. Partially scrapped in place.

=== 31 December ===
List of shipwrecks: 31 December 1946
Ship	State	Description
Empire Wharfe	United Kingdom	The cargo liner caught fire at sea. She was on a voyage from Garston, Lancashire to the Cameroons. She was towed in to Lagos Nigeria on 2 January 1947 and beached. She was refloated on 6 January. Subsequently repaired and returned to service as Zent.
Monte Pascoal	United Kingdom	The Monte-class ocean liner was scuttled in the Skagerrak, laden with gas shells.
Schwabenland	Germany	The seaplane tender/catapult ship was scuttled in the Skagerrak, laden with gas shells.

=== Unknown date ===
List of shipwrecks: Unknown date December 1946
Ship	State	Description
HMS H 97	Royal Navy	The captured German destroyer was beached to prevent her from sinking due to corroded bottom plates.
HMS Truant	Royal Navy	The decommissioned submarine was wrecked while under tow to the breakers.

== Unknown date ==
List of shipwrecks: unknown 1946
Ship	State	Description
Alice L. Pendleton	United States	The 228-foot (69 m), 1,349-gross register ton four-masted lumber schooner was abandoned at the Palmer Shipyard on the west side of the Mystic River in Noank, Connecticut, sometime during the 1940s, gradually rotted away, and settled on the river bottom in 10 feet (3.0 m) of water.
Benjamin Peixotto	United States	The Liberty ship was reported to have become a constructive total loss during 1946.
Claus Von Bevern	Germany	The test ship, a former G180-class torpedo boat, was scuttled in the Skagerrak, laden with gas shells.
Koolama	Australia	The cargo ship was scuttled.
Unknown	France	A concrete-hulled tugboat, possibly converted to a barge, was wrecked on Omaha Beach, Normandy, in a winter storm in 1946 or 1947. Broken up as a hazard to swimmers in March 2023.
Yu 1007	Imperial Japanese Army	The surrendered Yu I-type Type 3 submergence transport vehicle sank in a storm at Mikuriya, Japan, in either 1945 or 1946. She later was salvaged, and was scrapped in January 1948.

== See also ==
- Lists of shipwrecks
