= SS Levenwood =

SS Levenwood is the name of the following ships:

- SS Levenwood (1923), renamed Devenbrook in 1946, wrecked 28 Augyust 1946
- SS Levenwood (1946), originally named Empire Bromley in 1945, later renamed SS Basildon in 1951, scrapped in 1967
