= SS Alfios =

Greek cargo ship

History
- Name: Bolivian (1919–1933); Alfios (1933–1946)
- Owner: Theofano Maritime
- Port of registry: Chios, Greece
- Yard number: 602
- Launched: 8 December 1919
- Completed: 1919
- Identification: Code Letters SVLT
- Fate: Wrecked off Nova Scotia in April 1946

General characteristics
- Type: Cargo ship
- Tonnage: 3,154 GRT
- Length: 400 ft (120 m)
- Beam: 52.5 ft (16.0 m)
- Depth: 28.5 ft (8.7 m)

SS Alfios, built as SS Bolivian, was a B-class standard cargo ship built by the British government and later operated by the Greek mercantile company Theofano Maritime.

== Characteristics ==
Alfios was a cargo freighter which had a gross register tonnage of 3,154 GRT which measured 400 ft (120 m) long, 52.5 ft (16.0 m) broad, and 28.5 ft (8.7 m) tall. It was made of steel and was powered by three triple expansion engines made by Richardsons Westgarth which produced 517 nominal horsepower for a speed of 12 knots.

== History ==
The ship was built as Bolivian in 1919 at West Hartlepool, United Kingdom, by Irvine's Shipbuilding for Frederick Leyland & Company and was registered at Chios, Greece. In 1933, the ship became owned by N.G. Livanos and was renamed Alfios. Later that year, it was obtained by Theofano Maritime, who would operate the ship until it sunk in 1946.

On 24 April 1946, Alfios was in transit across the Atlantic Ocean from Glasgow to Halifax to pick up a shipment of pit props. While steaming near Sable Island, Alfios ran aground on a shallow spit of sand. A week after the ship was wrecked, on 1 May, HMCS Middlesex set out to rescue the 30 crew and 2 passengers stranded on Alfios. Middlesex successfully rescued everyone aboard, bringing them to safety in Ottawa.

By 1 June 1946 Alfios was still firmly aground in the place where it wrecked, with its breeches buoy rigged from the deck to the shore. In the 1980s, the wreck was still visible from the air, and its position was precisely mapped by a Canadian Hydrographic Service survey.
