= USS LST-929 =

1944 LST-542-class tank landing ship

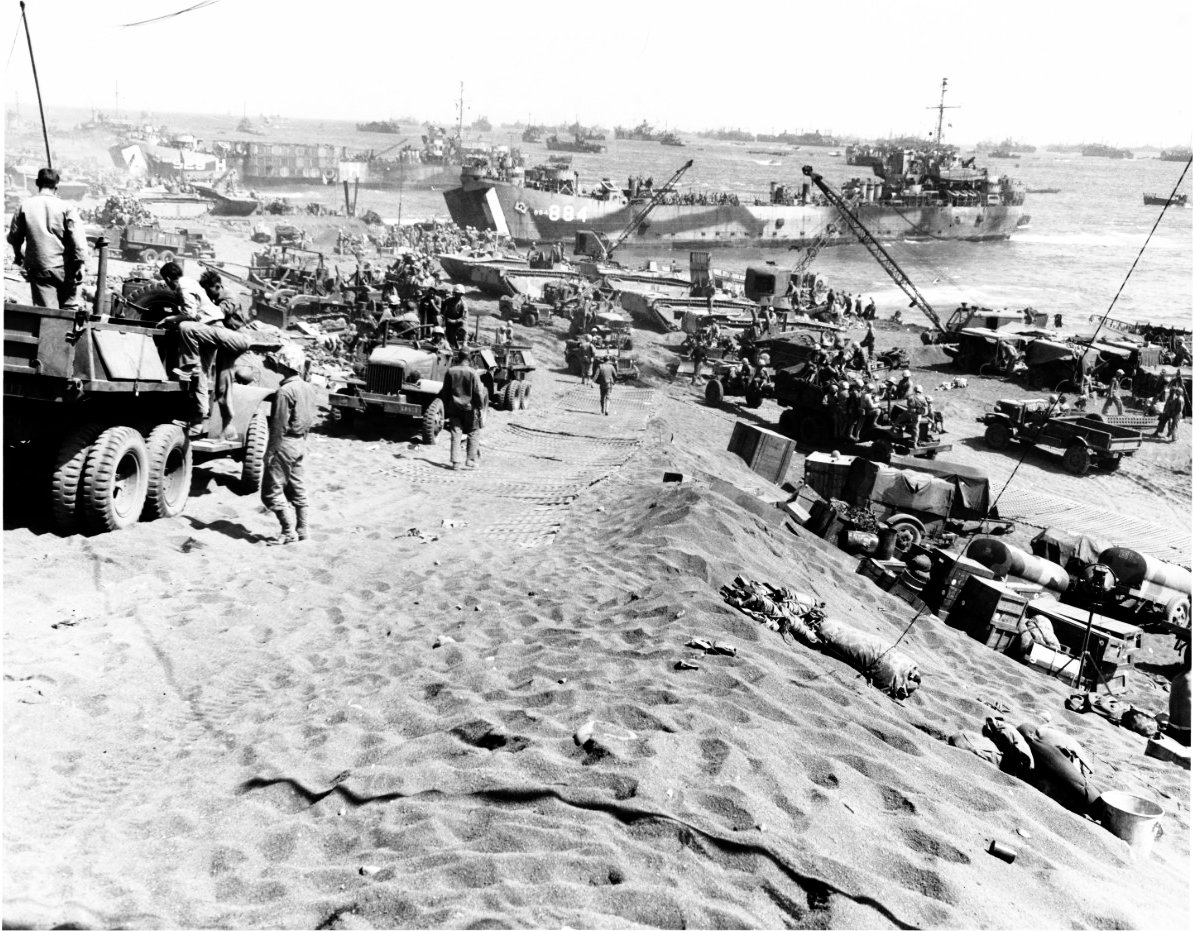
- Vehicles on Iwo Jima's Red Beach, c. 25 February 1945, with LST-884 (center) and USS LST-929 (at left, with H markings on her hull) unloading in the background. Among the vehicles are trucks, mobile cranes, amphibious tractors (LVTs), jeeps and a variety of trailers. A field artillery piece is being pulled along in the right center. Note the pierced steel matting roadways.

History

United States
- Name: LST-929
- Builder: Bethlehem-Hingham Shipyard, Hingham, Massachusetts
- Yard number: 3399
- Laid down: 5 June 1944
- Launched: 8 July 1944
- Commissioned: 2 August 1944
- Decommissioned: 24 May 1946
- Reclassified: Landing Ship Tank (Hospital), 15 September 1945
- Stricken: 3 July 1946
- Identification: Hull symbol: LST-929; Hull symbol: LST(H)-929; Code letters: NVSD
- Honors and awards: 2 × battle star
- Fate: Sold to the Chinese Nationalist Navy, 24 May 1946

Republic of China
- Acquired: 24 May 1946
- Status: fate unknown

General characteristics
- Class & type: LST-542-class tank landing ship
- Displacement: 1,625 long tons (1,651 t) (light); 4,080 long tons (4,145 t) (full (seagoing draft with 1,675 short tons (1,520 t) load); 2,366 long tons (2,404 t) (beaching)
- Length: 328 ft (100 m) oa
- Beam: 50 ft (15 m)
- Draft: Unloaded: 2 ft 4 in (0.71 m) forward; 7 ft 6 in (2.29 m) aft; Full load: 8 ft 3 in (2.51 m) forward; 14 ft 1 in (4.29 m) aft; Landing with 500 short tons (450 t) load: 3 ft 11 in (1.19 m) forward; 9 ft 10 in (3.00 m) aft; Limiting 11 ft 2 in (3.40 m); Maximum navigation 14 ft 1 in (4.29 m)
- Installed power: 2 × 900 hp (670 kW) Electro-Motive Diesel 12-567A diesel engines; 1,800 shp (1,300 kW)
- Propulsion: 1 × Falk main reduction gears; 2 × Propellers
- Speed: 11.6 kn (21.5 km/h; 13.3 mph)
- Range: 24,000 nmi (44,000 km; 28,000 mi) at 9 kn (17 km/h; 10 mph) while displacing 3,960 long tons (4,024 t)
- Boats & landing craft carried: 2 x LCVPs
- Capacity: 1,600–1,900 short tons (3,200,000–3,800,000 lb; 1,500,000–1,700,000 kg) cargo depending on mission
- Troops: 16 officers, 147 enlisted men
- Complement: 13 officers, 104 enlisted men
- Armament: Varied, ultimate armament; 2 × twin 40 mm (1.57 in) Bofors guns; 4 × single 40 mm Bofors guns; 12 × 20 mm (0.79 in) Oerlikon cannons

Service record
- Part of: LST Flotilla 6
- Operations: Assault and occupation of Iwo Jima (19–28 February 1945); Assault and occupation of Okinawa Gunto (1 April–30 June 1945)
- Awards: China Service Medal; American Campaign Medal; Asiatic–Pacific Campaign Medal; World War II Victory Medal; Navy Occupation Service Medal w/Asia Clasp

USS LST-929/LST(H)-929 was an LST-542-class tank landing ship in the United States Navy. Like many of her class, she was not named and is properly referred to by her hull designation.

== Construction ==
LST-929 was laid down on 5 June 1944, at Hingham, Massachusetts, by the Bethlehem-Hingham Shipyard; launched on 8 July 1944; and commissioned on 2 August 1944.

== Service history ==
During World War II, LST-929 was assigned to the Asiatic-Pacific theater and participated in the assault and occupation of Iwo Jima in February 1945, and the assault and occupation of Okinawa Gunto from April through June 1945.

On 15 September 1945, she was redesignated LST(H)-929. Following the war, the ship performed occupation duty in the Far East and saw service in China until late May 1946. LST(H)-929 was decommissioned on 24 May 1946, and turned over to the Chinese Nationalist Navy. She was struck from the Navy list on 3 July 1946.

== Awards ==
LST-929 earned two battle star for World War II service.

== Bibliography ==
Online resources

- "LST-929". Dictionary of American Naval Fighting Ships. Naval History and Heritage Command. This article incorporates text from this source, which is in the public domain.
- "Bethlehem-Hingham, Hingham MA". www.ShipbuildingHistory.com. 11 August 2011.
- "USS LST-929". NavSource. 28 April 2017.
