= USS Solar =

Buckley-class destroyer escort (US Navy)

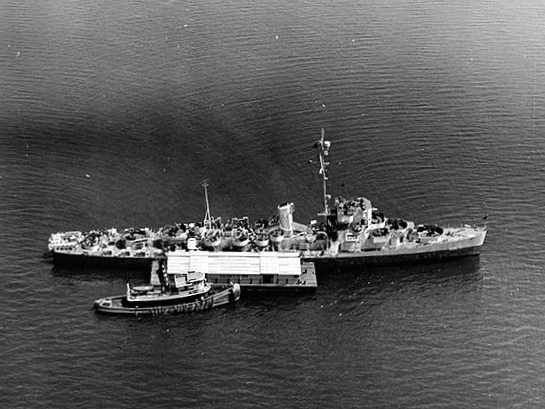
- USS Solar (DE-221) in New York Harbor with a barge and harbor tug alongside. Photographed 22 July 1944, from a 300-foot altitude by a Naval Air Station New York aircraft.

History

United States
- Name: Solar
- Namesake: BM1 Adolfo Solar
- Ordered: 1942
- Laid down: 22 February 1943
- Launched: 29 May 1943
- Commissioned: 15 February 1944
- Decommissioned: 21 May 1946
- Stricken: 5 June 1946
- Fate: Scuttled following ammunition explosion, 9 June 1946

General characteristics
- Class & type: Buckley-class destroyer escort
- Displacement: 1,400 long tons (1,422 t) standard; 1,740 long tons (1,768 t) full load
- Length: 306 ft (93 m)
- Beam: 37 ft (11 m)
- Draft: 9 ft 6 in (2.90 m) standard; 11 ft 3 in (3.43 m) full load
- Propulsion: 2 × boilers; General Electric turbo-electric drive; 12,000 shp (8.9 MW); 2 × solid manganese-bronze 3,600 lb (1,600 kg) 3-bladed propellers, 8 ft 6 in (2.59 m) diameter, 7 ft 7 in (2.31 m) pitch; 2 × rudders; 359 tons fuel oil
- Speed: 23 knots (43 km/h; 26 mph)
- Range: 3,700 nmi (6,900 km) at 15 knots (28 km/h; 17 mph); 6,000 nmi (11,000 km) at 12 kn (22 km/h; 14 mph)
- Complement: 15 officers, 198 men
- Armament: 3 × 3"/50 caliber guns; 1 × quad 1.1"/75 caliber gun; 8 × single 20 mm guns; 1 × triple 21-inch (533 mm) torpedo tubes; 1 × Hedgehog anti-submarine mortar; 8 × K-gun depth charge projectors; 2 × depth charge tracks

USS Solar (DE-221) (pronounced sō-lär), a Buckley-class destroyer escort of the United States Navy, was named in honor of Boatswain's Mate First Class Adolfo Solar (1900–1941), who was killed in action during the Japanese attack on Pearl Harbor on 7 December 1941.

Solar was laid down on 22 February 1943, by the Philadelphia Navy Yard; launched on 29 May 1943, sponsored by Mrs. Regina Solar; and commissioned at Philadelphia on 15 February 1944.

The ship was named after Adolfo Solar, who manned an anti-aircraft gun aboard the battleship Nevada during the Japanese attack on Pearl Harbor, where he was killed in action.

Solar was destroyed by an accidental explosion on 30 April 1946.

== Service history ==
=== World War II ===
Solar completed post-commissioning trials in the Delaware River and shakedown training in the Bermuda area; then returned to Philadelphia at the beginning of April 1944. After post-shakedown availability, she headed for Casco Bay, Maine, for more training.

On 25 April, Solar put to sea from New York City with Task Group 27.1 in the screen of a Casablanca-bound convoy. The convoy made Casablanca on 4 May; and, three days later Solar headed back toward the United States. She arrived in New York on 16 May. Solar was next assigned to Task Force 64, and spent the next six months escorting three convoys from the United States to the Mediterranean and back.

On 16 December 1944, the destroyer escort was assigned to the Commander, Operational Training Command, Atlantic Fleet (COTCLANT), to help train destroyer and destroyer-escort crews. On 2 February 1945, she resumed Atlantic convoy escort duty as an element of TG 60.9. On her first voyage of this new assignment, Solar encountered her first combat, though she herself was unable to engage the enemy submarines. Her convoy, UGS-72, lost two tankers at the entrance to the Strait of Gibraltar. Solar fueled and provisioned at Oran, Algeria; then escorted convoy GUS-74 to the United States. After yard work at New York, she got underway in the screen of another Gibraltar-bound convoy.

During the return voyage from Oran with convoy GUS-86, the ship received the news of Allied victory in Europe. Upon her return to the United States, Solar was scheduled for her usual yard period in New York. However, after several sets of confusing and sometimes contradictory orders, the work was carried out in Boston.

=== Post-war ===
In the spring of 1945, Solar was slated to be converted to a radar picket ship by the Philadelphia Navy Yard, but the yard was unable to work on her. Instead, she was assigned to training duty with submarines out of New London, Connecticut. By 18 July, she was in the Boston Navy Yard preparing for duty in the Pacific. Her conversion to radar picket ship had been canceled and, with the declaration of V-J day in mid-August, her orders were changed again. She departed Boston on 7 September, for two weeks of refresher training at Guantanamo Bay, Cuba. At the completion of refresher training, she headed for Casco Bay; but, en route there, she was diverted to Miami, Florida, where she became the training group flagship. In late October, she visited Baltimore for the Navy Day celebration. On 19 December, Solar was assigned to the commander, Operational Development Force, for anti-aircraft and fighter director practice. The beginning of 1946 brought an assignment as a sonar test ship.

=== Destruction by accidental explosion ===
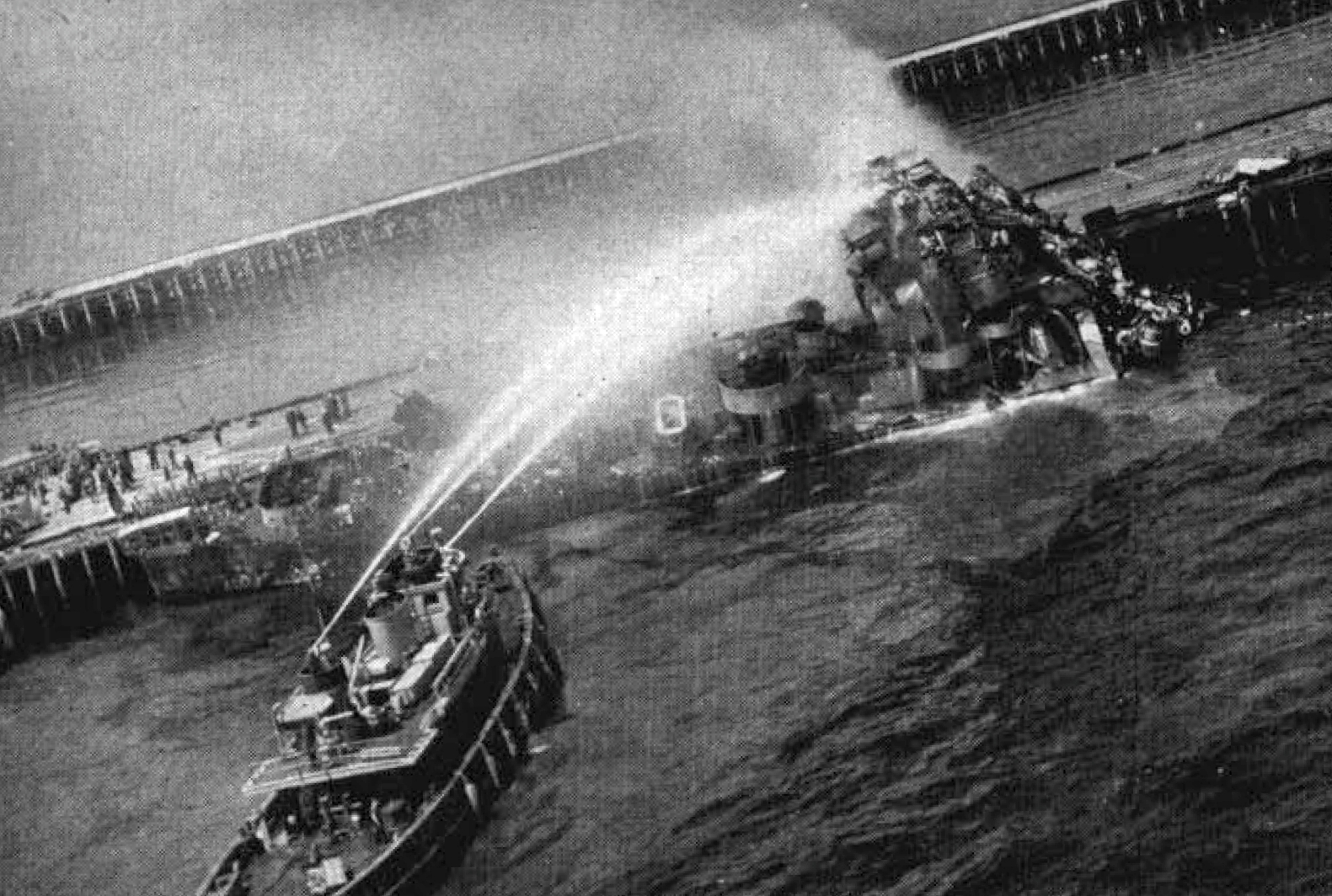
Solar after the explosions on 30 April 1946.

On 30 April 1946, Solar was berthed at Leonardo Pier I of the Naval Ammunition Depot Earle, New Jersey, to discharge ammunition. The operation went smoothly until, shortly after 11:30, one of the crewmen dropped a hedgehog charge. ("The United Press quoted witnesses as saying a shell being passed by Seaman Joseph Stuckinski of Baltimore from the ship to a truck on the pier exploded in his arms and set off the blasts. Stuckinski was not injured.") He was able to escape with relatively minor injuries, but three ensuing explosions blasted the ship near her number 2 upper handling rooms. Her number 2 gun was demolished and the bridge, main battery director, and mast were all blown aft and to starboard. Both sides of the ship were torn open, and her deck was a mass of flames. The order to abandon ship came after the second explosion and was carried out expeditiously. Nevertheless, the tragedy claimed the lives of seven sailors and injured 125 others.

Salvage work on Solar was begun by 15:00, and her wrecked superstructure was cut off to prevent her from capsizing. She was moved to New York, where she decommissioned on 21 May 1946. Solar was then stripped of all usable equipment, towed 100 nmi (200 km) to sea, and sunk on 9 June 1946, in 700 fathoms (1,300 m) of water. Her name was struck from the Navy List on 5 June 1946.

On July 5, 2022, the last living survivor of the explosions – Seaman J.D. Reed – died at age 95.
