= SS Northeastern Victory =

Victory ship of the United States

- Typical Victory ship

History

United States
- Name: Northeastern Victory
- Namesake: Northeastern University in Boston
- Owner: War Shipping Administration
- Operator: American-Hawaiian Steamship Company
- Builder: Permanente Metals, plant No. 2
- Laid down: March 28, 1945
- Launched: May 7, 1945
- Completed: June 30, 1945
- Fate: Sank December 24, 1946 on Goodwin Sands.

General characteristics
- Class & type: VC2-S-AP3 Victory ship
- Tonnage: 7,612 GRT, 4,553 NRT
- Displacement: 15,200 tons
- Length: 455 ft (139 m)
- Beam: 62 ft (19 m)
- Draught: 28 ft (8.5 m)
- Installed power: 8,500 shp (6,300 kW)
- Propulsion: HP & LP turbines geared to a single 20.5-foot (6.2 m) propeller
- Speed: 16.5 knots (30.6 km/h; 19.0 mph)
- Boats & landing craft carried: 4 lifeboats
- Complement: 62 Merchant Marine and 28 US Naval Armed Guards
- Armament: 1 × 5-inch (127 mm)/38 caliber gun; 1 × 3-inch (76 mm)/50 caliber gun; 8 × 20 mm Oerlikon

SS Northeastern Victory was a cargo ship built during World War II, under the Emergency Shipbuilding program. The Northeastern Victory (MCV-735) was a type VC2-S-AP2 Victory ship built by Richmond Shipyards|Permanente Metals Corporation, Yard 2, of Richmond, California. The cargo ship was the 703rd ship built. The ship was laid down on March 28, 1945 and completed on June 30, 1945. Northeastern Victory was an armed cargo ship named after a Northeastern University in Boston. She was built at the Oregon Shipbuilding yards in just 96 days. The 10,600-ton ship was constructed for the Maritime Commission. The American-Hawaiian Steamship Company operated her under the United States Merchant Marine act for the War Shipping Administration.

Northeastern Victory served in the Atlantic Ocean, taking supplies to troops still in Europe after Victory in Europe Day, on 8 May 1945.

== Sinking ==
In 1946, after the conclusion of the war, Northeastern Victory was carrying supplies to U.S. troops deployed in Europe, to be delivered to Antwerp, Rotterdam and Bremen. Its food cargo comprised ten thousand cases of grapefruit, five thousand tons of flour, and a thousand tons of rice and cotton. During its journey, on Christmas Eve, about five miles (8.0 km) from the South Foreland Lighthouse, the ship ran aground on the Goodwin Sands. The ship was travelling at peak velocity and sustained severe damage to its engines. The South Foreland Lighthouse reportedly sent out warning shots prior to the accident, however, was unable to affect the direction or speed of the ship. Upon hearing the shots, the Walmer Lifeboat Station dispatched lifeboats carrying 36 crew members, which reached the ship at about 10 p.m. The ship's captain, Captain Kohstrohs resolved to stay with the ship, as did many of the crew. The powerful gale, and the damage caused by the running aground, smashed the massive structure into two in merely a few hours, with the seven officers still on board. By Christmas morning, the two parts of the ship lay 100 feet apart. The Walmer lifeboat helped the remaining crew and officers out of the wreck. A salvage team labored to save as much of the cargo as possible. The first rescue team was Risdon Beazley Ltd of Southampton under Commander J. MacPhee, Salvage Officer Lloyds Agents at Dover, they were able to recover 1,288 tons of the lead. Later the salvage steamer, Foremost, arrived from Swansea to assist in the salvage operations. The Northeastern Victory wreck was identifiable on the sands until a storm drove its masts under the waters in January 1995.

== See also ==
- SS Luray Victory – made the same error and sank on the Goodwin Sands on January 30, 1946.

== Sources ==
- Sawyer, L.A. and W.H. Mitchell. Victory ships and tankers: The history of the ‘Victory’ type cargo ships and the tankers built in the United States of America during World War II, Cornell Maritime Press, 1974, 0-87033-182-5.
- United States Maritime Commission:
- Victory Cargo Ships
