= SS Levenwood (1923) =

History
- Name: Levenwood (1924–1946); Devenbrook (1946–)
- Owner: Joseph Constantine Steamship Co Ltd
- Launched: 7 November 1923
- Fate: Wrecked 28 August 1946

General characteristics
- Type: Cargo ship
- Tonnage: 800 GRT

SS Levenwood was a Joseph Constantine Steamship Co Ltd vessel that sailed as a coaster along the North Sea coast of eastern England between 1924 and 1946.

== Dunkirk evacuation ==
The 800 ton store ship distinguished itself at Dunkirk on Friday 31 May 1940. The vessel was armed as a DEMS ship by soldiers of the Royal Lancashire Regiment and rescued soldiers from the Bray-Dunes area of the beach during Operation Dynamo. The ship's crew's decorations are listed in the Dunkirk lists at Greenwich as one awarded Distinguished Service Cross (Captain William Oswald Young) and two Distinguished Service Medals (Fireman Robert Moody and Gunner George Knight).

This vessel was damaged towards the end of the war and renamed SS Devenbrook in 1945.

== See also ==
- SS Basildon
