= SS Basildon =

History
- Name: Empire Bromley (1945-46); Levenwood (1946-51); Basildon (1951-67)
- Owner: Ministry of War Transport (1945-46); Constantine Shipping Co (1946-61); Panax (Overseas) Ltd (1961-62); Don Shipping Co Ltd (1962-63); R S Braggs & Co (Shipping) Ltd (1963-67)
- Operator: Joseph Constantine Steamship Line Ltd (1945-61); Panax (Overseas) Ltd (1961-62); C M Willie & Co (Shipping) Ltd (1962-63); R S Braggs & Co (Shipping) Ltd (1963-67)
- Port of registry: (United Kingdom) Greenock (1945-46); (United Kingdom) Middlesbrough (1946-67)
- Builder: G Brown & Co (Marine) Ltd, Greenock.
- Yard number: 233
- Launched: 26 May 1945
- Completed: June 1945
- Out of service: October 1967
- Identification: UK Official Number 169524; Code Letters GDTM (1945-46)
- Fate: Scrapped 1967

General characteristics
- Tonnage: 1,058 GRT; 584 NRT; 1,410 DWT
- Length: 204 ft 8 in (62.38 m)
- Beam: 32 ft 8 in (9.96 m)
- Depth: 13 ft 7 in (4.14 m)
- Propulsion: 1 × triple expansion steam engine

Basildon was a 1,055 gross register tons (GRT) coaster that was built in 1945 as Empire Bromley for the Ministry of War Transport (MoWT). She was sold into civil service in 1946 and renamed Levenwood. Another change of ownership saw her renamed Basildon and she served under this name until scrapped in 1967.

== Description ==
Empire Bromley was built by G Brown & Co (Marine) Ltd, Greenock. She was yard number 233. Launched on 26 May 1945, she was completed in June 1945.

The ship was 204 feet 8 inches (62.38 m) long, with a beam of 32 feet 8 inches (9.96 m) and a depth of 13 feet 7 inches (4.14 m). She was propelled by a triple expansion steam engine that had cylinders of 14 inches (36 cm), 24 inches (61 cm) and 40 inches (100 cm) bore by 27 inches (69 cm) stroke. The engine was built by Rankin & Blackmore Ltd, Greenock. She had a GRT of 1,058, with a NRT of 584 and a DWT of 1,410.

== Career ==
Empire Bromley's port of registry was Greenock. She was operated under the management of John Kelly Ltd, and then Joseph Constantine Steamship Co Ltd. In 1946, she was sold to Constantine Shipping Co and renamed Levenwood. Her port of registry was changed to Middlesbrough. She was operated under the management of J Constantine Steamship Line Ltd. On 31 January 1953, Levenwood was in the North Sea and in danger of drifting ashore on the Lincolnshire coast. A distress call was issued and a tugboat requested.

Levenwood was sold in 1961 to Panax (Overseas) Ltd, London and renamed Basildon. She was sold in 1962 to Don Shipping Co Ltd, operated under the management of C M Willie & Co (Shipping) Ltd. Basildon was sold in 1963 to R S Braggs & Co (Shipping) Ltd. She was scrapped in October 1967 at Burcht, Belgium.

== Official Numbers and Code Letters ==
Official Numbers were a forerunner to IMO Numbers. The ship had the UK Official Number 169524. Empire Bromley used the Code Letters GDTM.

== SS Levenwood ==
The Joseph Constantine Steamship Co Ltd also owned an earlier vessel that sailed under the name Levenwood. The 800 ton store ship distinguished itself at Dunkirk on Friday 31 May 1940. The vessel was armed as a DEMS ship by soldiers of the Royal Lancashire Regiment and rescued soldiers from the Bray-Dunes area of the beach during Operation Dynamo.
