= USS LST-884 =

World War II tank landing ship

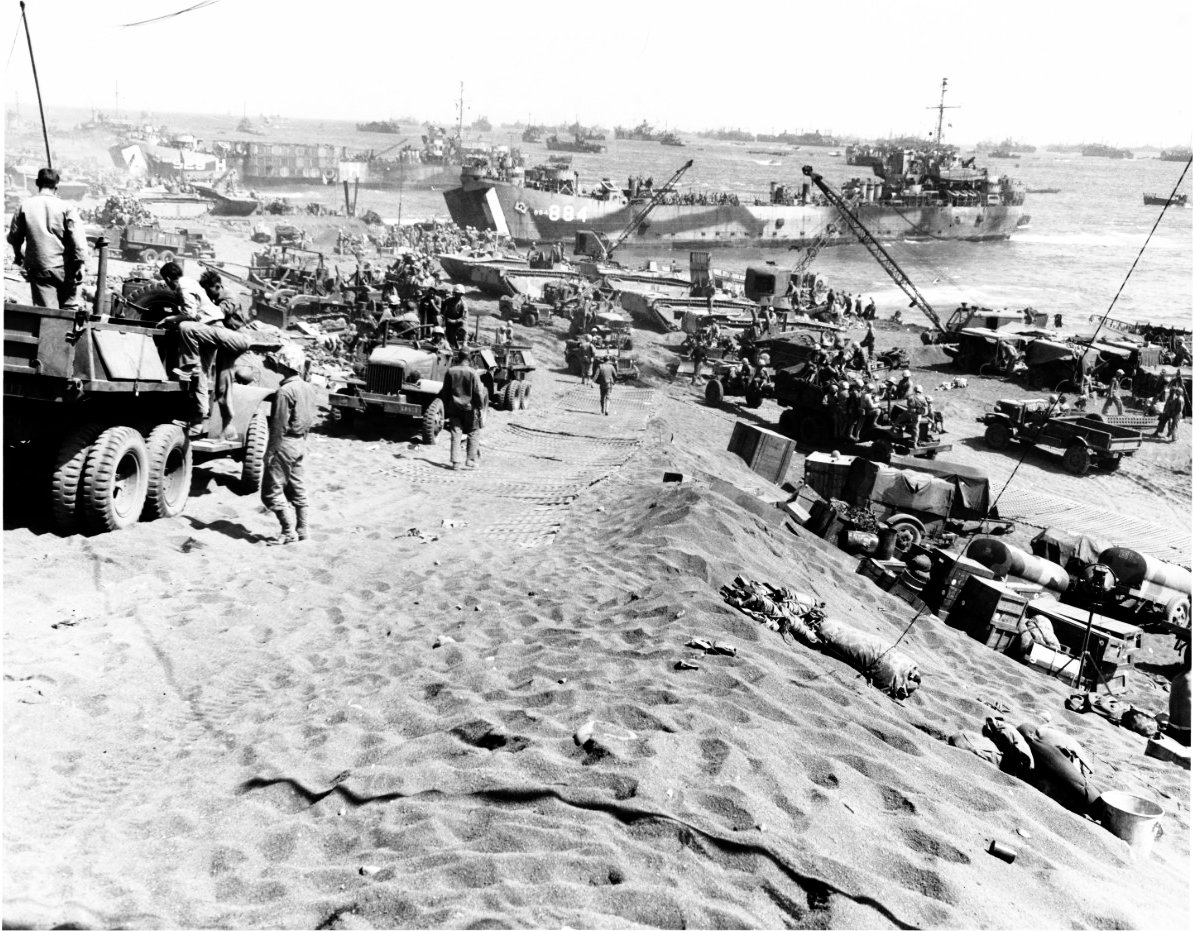
- Vehicles on Iwo Jima's Red Beach, c. 25 February 1945, with LST-884 (center) and USS LST-929 (at left, with H markings on her hull) unloading in the background.

History

United States
- Name: USS LST-884
- Builder: Dravo Corporation, Pittsburgh, Pennsylvania
- Laid down: 23 July 1944
- Launched: 30 September 1944
- Commissioned: 10 October 1945
- Decommissioned: 16 February 1946
- Stricken: 21 May 1946
- Honours and awards: 2 battle stars (World War II)
- Fate: Sunk, 6 May 1946

General characteristics
- Class & type: LST-542-class tank landing ship
- Displacement: 1,490 long tons (1,514 t) light; 4,080 long tons (4,145 t) full
- Length: 328 ft (100 m)
- Beam: 50 ft (15 m)
- Draft: 8 ft (2.4 m) forward; 14 ft 4 in (4.37 m) aft
- Propulsion: 2 × General Motors 12-567 diesel engines, two shafts
- Speed: 10.8 knots (20.0 km/h; 12.4 mph)
- Complement: 7 officers, 104 enlisted men
- Armament: 6 × 40 mm guns; 6 × 20 mm guns

USS LST-884 was an LST-542-class tank landing ship in the United States Navy. Like many of her class, she was not named and is properly referred to by her hull designation.

LST-884 was laid down on 23 July 1944 at Pittsburgh, Pennsylvania, by the Dravo Corporation; launched on 30 September 1944; sponsored by Mrs. Michael Durkin; and commissioned on 10 October 1944.

== Service history ==
During World War II, LST-884 was assigned to the Asiatic-Pacific theater and participated in the assault and occupation of Iwo Jima in February 1945 and the assault and occupation of Okinawa Gunto in April 1945. Due to extensive damage resulting from a kamikaze attack on 1 April 1945, LST-884 was decommissioned on 16 February 1946, and her hulk was sunk on 6 May 1946. The ship was struck from the Navy list on 21 May 1946.

LST-884 earned two battle stars for World War II service.

Its wreck was surveyed by Okeanos Redux in 2026
