= MV Empire Cross =

World War II merchant ship of the United Kingdom

History

United Kingdom
- Name: Empire Cross
- Owner: Ministry of War Transport
- Operator: 1945: Hadley Shipping Co Ltd; 1946: Anglo-Saxon Petroleum Co Ltd
- Port of registry: 1945: Sunderland; 1946: London
- Builder: Sir James Laing & Sons Ltd, Sunderland
- Yard number: 765
- Launched: 28 June 1945
- Completed: November 1945
- Identification: UK official number 181112
- Fate: Exploded and sank 1946; Raised and scrapped 1952

General characteristics
- Type: Oil tanker
- Tonnage: 3,738 GRT; 2,000 NRT; 5,110 DWT
- Length: 353.5 ft (107.7 m)
- Beam: 48.3 ft (14.7 m)
- Draught: 21 ft 11 1/2 in (6.69 m)
- Depth: 26.5 ft (8.1 m)
- Installed power: 2,500 bhp
- Propulsion: two-stroke diesel engine
- Sensors & processing systems: direction finding equipment; echo sounding equipment

MV Empire Cross was a motor tanker that was built in England in 1945. She was launched as an Empire ship for the Ministry of War Transport (MoWT). In 1946 she exploded and sank in Haifa in Palestine, killing 25 of her crew.

== Building and specifications ==
Sir James Laing & Sons Ltd built Empire Cross in its Deptford shipyard in Sunderland on the River Wear in County Durham. She was yard number 765. She was launched on 28 June 1945 and completed that November.

Empire Cross was an "intermediate tanker" for the MoWT. Her registered length was 353.5 ft (107.7 m), her beam was 48.3 ft (14.7 m) and her depth was 26.5 ft (8.1 m). Her tonnages were 3,738 GRT, 2,000 NRT and 5,110 DWT.

William Doxford & Sons built her engine. It was a three-cylinder single-acting two-stroke diesel rated at 2,500 bhp.

Empire Cross had the UK official number 181112. Sources disagree as to whether her call sign was GDYW or GKLF.

== Career ==
The MoWT appointed Hadley Shipping Co Ltd to manage Empire Cross. Hadley's registered her in Sunderland. In 1946 the MoWT transferred her management to Anglo-Saxon Petroleum, who transferred her registration to London.

Anglo-Saxon is part of Royal Dutch Shell. In accordance with standard Shell practice, Anglo-Saxon planned to rename the ship after a genus of mollusc: in this case Balea. However, the ship was lost before she could be renamed.

== Loss ==
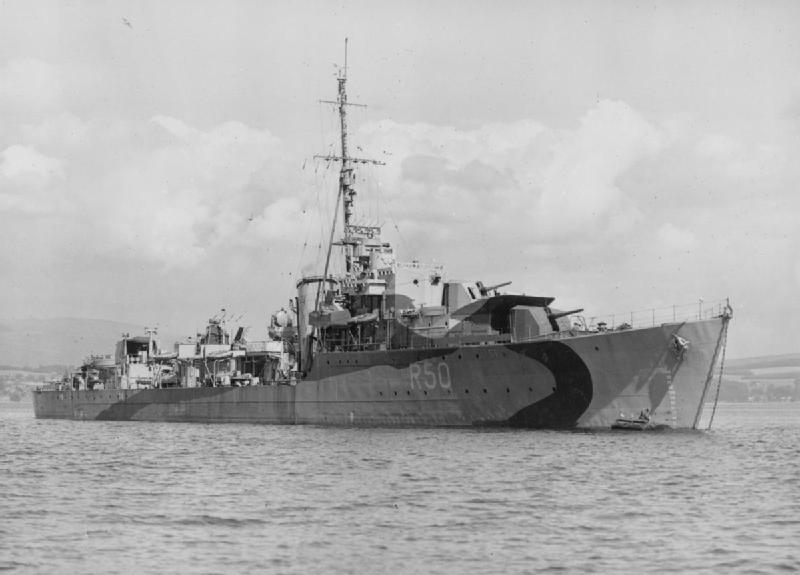
HMS Venus

On 1 August 1946 Empire Cross arrived off Haifa in Palestine with a cargo of aviation spirit from Port Said in Egypt. On 2 August the ship was discharging her cargo in Haifa Roads. At the same time two Royal Navy destroyers, HMS Venus and Virago, were operating nearby. Empire Cross's Master, John Banks, heard the explosion of depth charges dropped by the destroyers to deter Haganah frogmen from trying to attach limpet mines to ships.

Empire Cross exploded and caught fire. Captain Banks gave the order to abandon ship. He dived overboard, swam under the flames until he lost consciousness, and was rescued by members of Haganah. Venus and Virago rescued other survivors. Between 30 and 40 people were rescued. The burning tanker capsized and sank.

Four people were found dead and 21 were listed as missing. The dead were reported to be nine of Empire Cross's British officers, 12 of her Lascar crew and four local Palestinian Arab labourers. Those dead whose bodies were found were buried at Haifa.

== Suspected causes ==
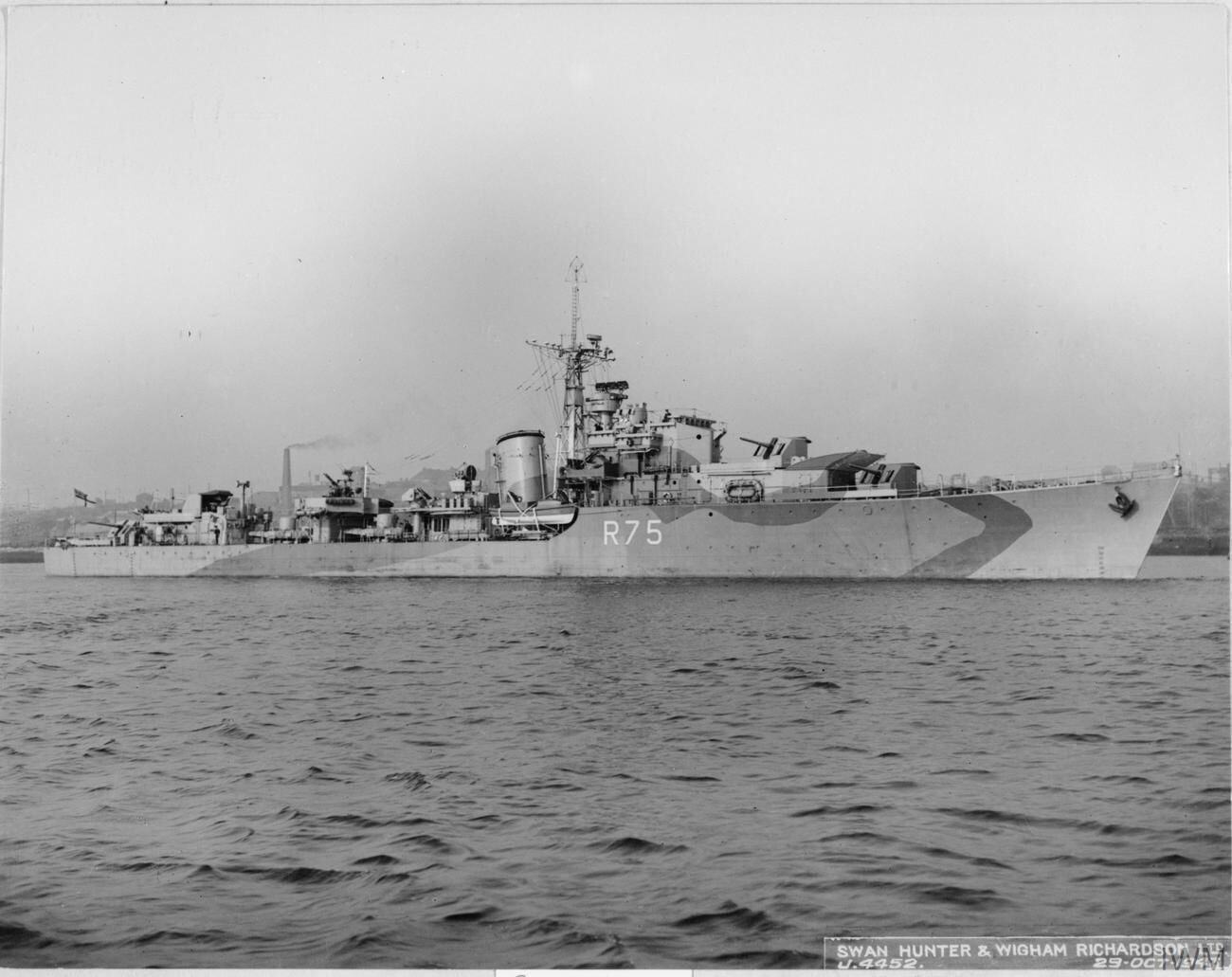
HMS Virago

A depth charge dropped by Virago was suspected of having caused the explosion. An inquest was held, at which the page in Virago's logbook for that day was found to be missing. However, the Admiralty dismissed the idea that a depth charge could have caused the explosion.

The news correspondent Clare Hollingworth, who at the time was in Palestine reporting for the News of the World, claimed that Haganah had blown up Empire Cross. A few days later a Haganah spokesman 'phoned the newspaper, denied the allegation, and accused Hollingworth of being "biased and motivated by hatred".

== Salvage ==
In 1952 Empire Cross's wreck was raised and scrapped.

== Bibliography ==
- Mitchell, WH; Sawyer, LA (1995). The Empire Ships. London, New York, Hamburg, Hong Kong: Lloyd's of London Press Ltd. ISBN 1-85044-275-4.
- Sharett, Moshe (1946). The Prison Letters of Moshe Sharett (PDF) (in Hebrew).
