= HMS Venus (R50) =

V-class destroyer converted to Type 15 frigate of the Royal Navy

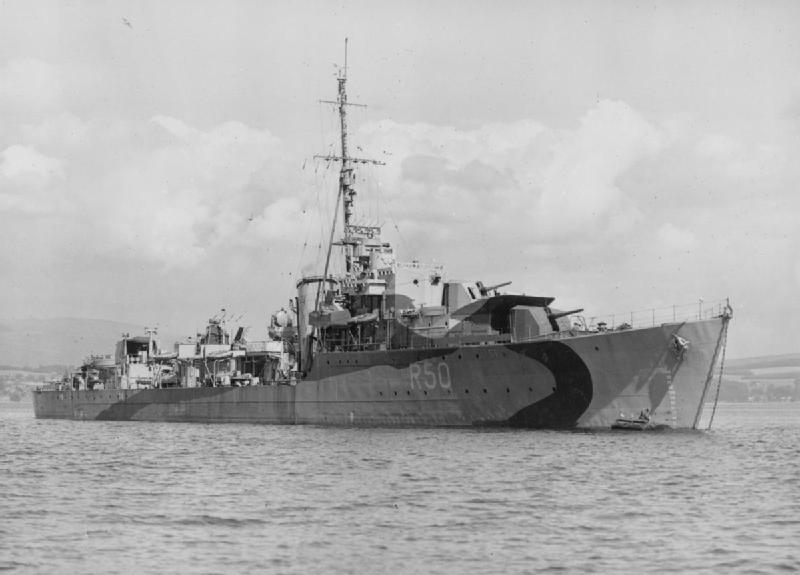
- Venus in August 1943

History

United Kingdom
- Name: HMS Venus
- Ordered: 1 September 1941
- Builder: Fairfield Shipbuilding and Engineering Company, Govan, Scotland
- Laid down: 12 January 1942
- Launched: 23 February 1943
- Commissioned: 28 August 1943
- Identification: Pennant number:R50; Later F50
- Honours and awards: Arctic 1943-44; Normandy 1944; Malaya 1945; Burma 1945
- Fate: Sold for scrap in 1972
- Badge: On a Field Blue, the symbol of the planet Venus Gold.

General characteristics V-class destroyer
- Class & type: V-class destroyer
- Displacement: 1,777 long tons (1,806 t) standard; 2,058 long tons (2,091 t) full load
- Length: 363 ft (111 m)
- Beam: 35 ft 8 in (10.87 m)
- Draught: 10 ft (3.0 m)
- Propulsion: 2 × Admiralty 3-drum water-tube boilers; Geared steam turbines, 40,000 shp (29,828 kW); 2 shafts
- Speed: 37 knots (43 mph; 69 km/h)
- Range: 4,860 nmi (9,000 km) at 29 kn (54 km/h)
- Complement: 180 (225 in flotilla leader)
- Armament: Original configuration : 4 × QF 4.7-inch (120-mm) Mk XII guns in single mountings CP Mk.XXII; 2 × QF 40 mm Bofors guns in twin mount Mk.IV; 6 × QF 20 mm Oerlikon guns; 2 × twin mounts Mk.V, 2 × single mounts Mk.III; 2 × quadruple tubes for 21 in (533 mm) torpedo Mk.IX

General characteristics Type 15 frigate
- Class & type: Type 15 frigate
- Displacement: 2,300 long tons (2,337 t) standard
- Length: 358 ft (109 m) o/a
- Beam: 37 ft 9 in (11.51 m)
- Draught: 14 ft 6 in (4.42 m)
- Propulsion: 2 × Admiralty 3-drum boilers, steam turbines on 2 shafts, 40,000 shp
- Speed: 31 knots (36 mph; 57 km/h) (full load)
- Complement: 174
- Sensors & processing systems: Radar; Type 293Q target indication (later Type 993); Type 277Q surface search; Type 974 navigation; Type 262 fire control on director CRBF; Type 1010 Cossor Mark 10 IFF; Sonar: Type 174 search; Type 162 target classification; Type 170 attack
- Armament: 1 × twin 4 in gun Mark 19; 1 × twin 40mm Bofors Mk.5; 2 × Squid A/S mortar or; 2 × Limbo Mark 10 A/S mortar

HMS Venus was a V-class destroyer of the Royal Navy that saw service during the Second World War. She was built by Fairfield Shipbuilding and Engineering Company, of Govan, Scotland and launched on 23 February 1943.

== Service history ==
=== Second World War service ===
She was part of the escorting destroyers of the 21st Aircraft Carrier Squadron involved in Operation Dracula from April to May 1945.

She participated in the Battle of the Malacca Strait with the destroyers Saumarez, Verulam, Vigilant, and Virago which culminated in the sinking of the Japanese cruiser Haguro on 16 May 1945.

=== Post war service ===
Between 1946 and 1949 Venus was part of the 3rd Destroyer Flotilla, based in the Mediterranean. This included work as part of the Royal Navy patrols preventing illegal Jewish immigration into Mandatory Palestine. In June 1946 she intercepted Josiah Wedgewood.

On 2 August 1946 the British oil tanker Empire Cross exploded, burned and sank in Haifa Roads, Palestine, killing 25 people. Virago and Venus took part in the rescue of survivors. Venus and Virago had been dropping depth charges in the area to deter Haganah frogmen from planting limpet mines.

Between 1949 and 1951 she was held in reserve at Devonport Dockyard. Between 1951 and 1952 she was converted at Devonport into a Type 15 fast anti-submarine frigate, with the new pennant number F50. Following conversion she became leader of the 6th Frigate Squadron. In 1953 she took part in the Fleet Review to celebrate the Coronation of Queen Elizabeth II. In 1955 she was refitted for work as part of the Dartmouth Training Squadron.

== Decommissioning and disposal ==
In 1964 Venus went to reserve and in October 1969 was in use as a target to measure the effects of ship to ship use of the Sea Dart missile system. She was sold to Thos. W. Ward for scrapping and arrived at their Briton Ferry yard on 20 December 1972 to be broken up.

== Publications ==
- Colledge, J. J.; Warlow, Ben (2006) [1969]. Ships of the Royal Navy: The Complete Record of All Fighting Ships of the Royal Navy from the 15th Century to the Present (3rd Rev ed.). London: Chatham Publishing. ISBN 978-1-86176-281-8. OCLC 67375475.
- Raven, Alan; Roberts, John (1978). War Built Destroyers O to Z Classes. London: Bivouac Books. ISBN 0-85680-010-4.
- Whitley, M. J. (1988). Destroyers of World War 2. Annapolis, Maryland: Naval Institute Press. ISBN 0-87021-326-1.
