= SS Luray Victory =

Victory ship of the United States

- Typical Victory ship

History

United States
- Name: Luray Victory
- Namesake: Luray, Virginia
- Owner: War Shipping Administration
- Operator: Black Diamond Steamship Company
- Builder: California Shipbuilding Company, Los Angeles
- Laid down: March 11, 1944
- Launched: May 11, 1944
- Completed: June 30, 1944
- Fate: Wrecked on Goodwin Sands, 30 January 1946

General characteristics
- Class & type: VC2-S-AP3 Victory ship
- Tonnage: 7,612 GRT, 4,553 NRT
- Displacement: 15,200 tons
- Length: 455 ft (139 m)
- Beam: 62 ft (19 m)
- Draught: 28 ft (8.5 m)
- Installed power: 8,500 shp (6,300 kW)
- Propulsion: HP & LP turbines geared to a single 20.5-foot (6.2 m) propeller, by Westinghouse Electric & Mfg. Co., Essington
- Speed: 16.5 knots (30.6 km/h; 19.0 mph)
- Boats & landing craft carried: 4 lifeboats
- Complement: 62 Merchant Marine and 28 US Naval Armed Guards
- Armament: 1 × 5-inch (127 mm)/38 caliber gun; 1 × 3-inch (76 mm)/50 caliber gun; 8 × 20 mm Oerlikon

SS Luray Victory was the seventeenth Victory ship, a new 10,500 ton class ship built during World War II. The California Shipbuilding Company built the ship under the Emergency Shipbuilding program. She was launched on May 11, 1944, and completed on June 26, 1944. The ship’s United States Maritime Commission designation was VC2-S-AP3, hull number 17 (V-17). Luray Victory served in the Pacific Ocean during World War II and was operated by the Black Diamond Steamship Company.

== Design ==
Victory ships were designed to replace the outdated Liberty ships. They would last longer and be able to serve the US Navy after World War II. The Victory ships differed from Liberty ships in that they were longer, wider, taller and faster. Victory ships had a thin stack set closer to the superstructure and had a long raised forecastle.

== Christening ==
Luray Victory was named after the city of Luray, Virginia, one of the 218 Victory ships named after an American city. She was launched at the yards of the California Shipbuilding Corporation in Wilmington, Los Angeles on May 11, 1944. The ship was the seventeenth in a long line of Victory ships, many of which were built at the California Shipbuilding Corporation ("Calship") yard. Her engines were built by the Joshua Hendy iron works in California.

== World War II ==
During World War II, Luray Victory operated in the Pacific Ocean bringing supplies to the US and the Allies. On November 30, 1944, Luray Victory reached New Guinea. The ship was part of convoy GB 720 which carried supplies to forces fighting in the Battle of Leyte and the Battle of Okinawa. From June 26 to August 15, 1945, she prepared for Operation Downfall, the invasion of the Japanese home islands with exercises at Leyte. When Japan surrendered on 15 August 1945, the exercises were cancelled.

== Shipwreck ==
In January 1946, Luray Victory departed Baltimore, Maryland. She was transporting grain to Bremerhaven, Germany as part of the Marshall Plan. She crossed the Atlantic Ocean at a speed near her maximum 16.5 knots. In the night of January 30, 1946, Luray Victory entered the Straits of Dover. She had no local maritime pilot on board and was steaming too fast and too close to the shore. The ship ran aground at Goodwin Sands, off the coast of Deal, Kent, England. She hit the sandbank hard and the engines stopped. By 9:00 p.m. the chief engineer had informed the captain that the engines were unable to be repaired. The captain of the ship sent a radio distress signal to the coast guard. At 10:27 p.m. the coast guard found the ship. A rescue could not be made until morning due to a low tide and rough seas.

On the morning of January 31, the rescue tugs, HMS Lady Bassey and Persia tried to free the ship, but the attempt was abandoned due to gale force winds. At 4:00 p.m., the coast guard returned to find Luray Victory breaking up and realised salvage was impossible. The forty-nine crew abandoned the ship, moved to shore by Freddie Upton, the lifeboat captain.

The top part of the shipwreck was visible for fifty years at 51º-ll'-04N, 001º-31'-62E.

On December 24, 1946, SS Northeastern Victory was also wrecked on the Goodwin Sands.

== See also ==
- List of Victory ships
- Liberty ship
- Type C1 ship
- Type C2 ship
- Type C3 ship

== Sources ==
- Sawyer L. A. and Mitchell W. H. Victory ships and tankers: the history of the ‘Victory’ type cargo ships and of the tankers built in the United States of America during World War II Cornell Maritime Press 1974, 0-87033-182-5.
- Victory Ships United States Maritime Commission.
- Victory Ships Armed guard website.
