= USAT Brigadier General M. G. Zalinski =

Former US Army transport ship

History

United States
- Name: SS Lake Frohna (1919–1924); SS Ace (1924–1941); USAT Brigadier General M. G. Zalinski (1941–1946)
- Builder: American Ship Building Company, Lorain, Ohio
- Yard number: 765
- Launched: 14 April 1919
- Out of service: 1946
- Fate: Sunk in storm, 26 September 1946

General characteristics
- Type: Cargo ship
- Tonnage: 2,600 GRT
- Length: 251 ft (77 m)
- Beam: 44 ft (13 m)
- Depth: 26 ft (7.9 m)

USAT Brigadier General M. G. Zalinski was a U.S. Army transport ship that served in World War II. It sank in 1946 in the Grenville Channel in British Columbia's Inside Passage. The crew were rescued by a tug boat and the SS Catala passenger steamer, but the cargo of army supplies, including some bombs, and her heavy fuel oil went down with the ship.

== History ==
The ship was built as the Lake Frohna (hull number 765) at the American Ship Building Company in Lorain, Ohio as a cargo vessel for the United States Shipping Board, and was delivered in June 1919. In 1924, she was sold to the Ace Steamship Company and renamed Ace. She changed hands again in 1930, being sold to the Terminals & Transportation Corporation of Duluth. Finally, in 1941, she became the Brigadier General M. G. Zalinski in the employ of the U.S. War Department.

=== Sinking ===
On 26 September 1946 the Zalinski was en route from Seattle to Whittier, Alaska, with a cargo of army supplies when she ran into the rocks of Pitt Island in the Grenville Channel, 55 miles south of Prince Rupert. The ship sank within twenty minutes, while her crew of 48 were rescued by the tug Sally N and the passenger steamer SS Catala. According to a report in The Vancouver Sun of 30 September 1946, at the time of her sinking she was transporting a cargo of at least twelve 500-pound (230 kg) bombs, large amounts of .30 and .50 caliber ammunition, at least 700 tonnes of bunker oil, and truck axles with army type tires.

=== Discovery ===
On 20 September 2003, the United States Coast Guard Cutter Maple reported an oil slick off Lowe Inlet. It was investigated by the Canadian Coast Guard Ship Tanu three days later, which obtained oil samples, but was unable to discover the source. In early October 2003, a commercial airline pilot reported further pollution. The Canadian Coast Guard confirmed the presence of the slick, and discovered that some three miles of shoreline had been affected. Again, no source was found, and the Coast Guard suspected that the oil could be surfacing from an old wreck.

On 30 October 2003 a survey by a remote control underwater vehicle located the wreck at 53°31.308′N 129°34.774′W. By mid-November, divers had been sent down twice to plug leaks in the hull. When investigations revealed that the ship was the Brigadier General M.G. Zalinski, and contained munitions, all operations were halted until an assessment was completed and the site declared safe. In January 2004 a warning was issued ordering mariners to avoid anchoring or fishing within 200 metres (660 ft) of the wreck, which is about 27 metres (89 ft) below the surface. The Canadian government is currently developing a plan to remove all the oil and munitions.

== Cleanup ==
The vessel has been leaking oil for some time. In May 2012 the Vancouver Sun and The Globe and Mail reported that new concerns over leaking oil have triggered emergency plans to deal with the leaking oil. In July 2013 the Canadian government announced a "significant environmental protection operation" to clean up the wreck site.

The 2013 operation removed 44,000 litres of heavy fuel oil from the wreck, temporarily bringing a halt to the leaks. An estimated 27,000 litres of oil remained on the vessel and in 2024 oil was again found in the channel. A new operation was launched in 2024 to remove the remaining fuel.
