= USS Tamaroa =

Tugboat of the United States Navy

History

United States
- Owner: United States Coast Guard
- Builder: Bethlehem Shipbuilding Corp.
- Laid down: 1919
- Launched: 1919
- Out of service: 14 May 1936
- Fate: Transferred to the US Navy

History

United States
- Owner: United States Navy
- Acquired: 14 May 1936
- Commissioned: 6 November 1936
- Stricken: 25 February 1946
- Fate: Sunk in San Francisco harbor

USS Tamaroa (AT-62) was a U.S. Navy tugboat which served from 1936 until she was sunk in a collision in 1946. She is not to be confused with the U.S. Coast Guard Cutter USCGC Tamaroa (WMEC-166).

== History ==
=== Nomenclature ===
Tamaroa is an American Indian tribe of the Illinois Confederacy. In the 17th and 18th centuries, the Tamaroa occupied both sides of the Mississippi River between the mouths of the Illinois and Missouri rivers. They were friendly with the French and deadly enemies of the Chickasaw and Shawnee. They disappeared as a tribe before the advent of the 19th century.

Tamaroa was also the name of the tribe's principal village, located at or near the present site of East St. Louis, III.

=== Construction ===
Tamaroa, a cutter built for the Coast Guard in 1919 at Elizabeth, N.J., by the Bethlehem Shipbuilding Corp., was transferred to the Navy on 14 May 1936 at San Francisco, Calif.; designated an ocean tug, AT-62; and commissioned at Mare Island Navy Yard on 6 November 1936.

=== Service ===
Tamaroa served all of her almost 10-year long Navy career in and around San Francisco, Calif., She was initially assigned to the Commandant, 12th Naval District, and that assignment continued until mid-1942. On 1 January 1938, she was reclassified a harbor tug, YT-136. On 23 July 1942, she was reassigned to the Commander, Western Sea Frontier, continuing to operate in San Francisco harbor. Tamaroa was again reclassified on 13 April 1944, when she was designated a large harbor tug, YTB-136. Three months later, she was decommissioned and placed in service.

=== Fate ===
The tug continued to serve in the 12th Naval District until 27 January 1946, when she collided with USS Jupiter (AVS-8) and sank in 42 feet of water in San Francisco harbor. Her name was struck from the Navy list on 25 February 1946.
