= HMCS Middlesex =

1943 Royal Canadian Navy minesweeper

History

Canada
- Name: Middlesex
- Builder: Port Arthur Shipbuilding Co. Ltd., Port Arthur
- Laid down: 29 September 1942
- Launched: 27 May 1943
- Commissioned: 6 August 1944
- Stricken: 12 December 1946
- Identification: Pennant number: J328
- Honours and awards: Atlantic 1944–45
- Fate: Ran aground 2 December 1946

General characteristics
- Class & type: Algerine-class minesweeper
- Displacement: 1,030 long tons (1,047 t) (standard); 1,325 long tons (1,346 t) (deep)
- Length: 225 ft (69 m) o/a
- Beam: 35 ft 6 in (10.82 m)
- Draught: 12.25 ft 6 in (3.89 m)
- Installed power: 2 × Admiralty 3-drum boilers; 2,400 ihp (1,800 kW)
- Propulsion: 2 shafts; 2 vertical triple-expansion steam engines
- Speed: 16.5 knots (30.6 km/h; 19.0 mph)
- Range: 5,000 nmi (9,300 km; 5,800 mi) at 10 knots (19 km/h; 12 mph)
- Complement: 85
- Armament: 1 × QF 4 in (102 mm) Mk V anti-aircraft gun; 4 × twin Oerlikon 20 mm cannon; 1 × Hedgehog

HMCS Middlesex was a reciprocating engine-powered Algerine-class minesweeper built for the Royal Canadian Navy during the Second World War. Entering service in 1944, the vessel served as a convoy escort in the Battle of the Atlantic. Following the war, the ship ran aground on 2 December 1946 and broken up for scrap.

== Design and description ==
The reciprocating group displaced 1,010–1,030 long tons (1,030–1,050 t) at standard load and 1,305–1,325 long tons (1,326–1,346 t) at deep load The ships measured 225 feet (68.6 m) long overall with a beam of 35 feet 6 inches (10.8 m). They had a draught of 12 feet 3 inches (3.7 m). The ships' complement consisted of 85 officers and ratings.

The reciprocating ships had two vertical triple-expansion steam engines, each driving one shaft, using steam provided by two Admiralty three-drum boilers. The engines produced a total of 2,400 indicated horsepower (1,800 kW) and gave a maximum speed of 16.5 knots (30.6 km/h; 19.0 mph). They carried a maximum of 660 long tons (671 t) of fuel oil that gave them a range of 5,000 nautical miles (9,300 km; 5,800 mi) at 10 knots (19 km/h; 12 mph).

The Algerine class was armed with a QF 4 in (102 mm) Mk V anti-aircraft gun and four twin-gun mounts for Oerlikon 20 mm cannon. The latter guns were in short supply when the first ships were being completed and they often got a proportion of single mounts. By 1944, single-barrel Bofors 40 mm mounts began replacing the twin 20 mm mounts on a one for one basis. All of the ships were fitted for four throwers and two rails for depth charges. Many Canadian ships omitted their sweeping gear in exchange for a 24-barrel Hedgehog spigot mortar and a stowage capacity for 90+ depth charges.

== Construction and career ==
Middlesex was laid down by Port Arthur Shipbuilding Co. Ltd. at Port Arthur, Ontario on 29 September 1942. The ship was launched on 27 May 1943 and commissioned into the Royal Canadian Navy at Port Arthur on 8 June 1944.

After commissioning, Middlesex sailed up the St. Lawrence River to Halifax, Nova Scotia. From there, the ship was sent to Bermuda to work up before returning to Halifax. Upon her return, the minesweeper was assigned to the Western Escort Force as a convoy escort in the Battle of the Atlantic. The ship deployed as part of escort group W-3, joining the group on 30 August 1944. In November 1944, Middlesex was made Senior Officer's Ship of the group. As Senior Officer Ship, the commander of the escort would be aboard her during convoy missions. She remained with the group as Senior Officer Ship until it was disbanded in June 1945.

Middlesex underwent a refit at Halifax before being placed in reserve there following the end of the war. In March 1946, the ship was reactivated as an emergency ship based out of Halifax. In April, Middlesex rescued 32 crew and passengers from the merchant vessel Alfios after the ship had run aground on Sable Island. While responding to an emergency call from the fishing vessel Ohio in December, Middlesex ran aground on Half Island Point near Halifax. The crew escaped unharmed and a naval tug was sent to assist the ship, while another ship was sent to assist Ohio. However, the ship was unable to be pulled off the rocks and declared a constructive total loss on 12 December 1946. The ship was officially put up for sale in March 1947.

== See also ==
- List of ships of the Canadian Navy

== Bibliography ==
- Burn, Alan (1999). The Fighting Commodores: The Convoy Commanders in the Second World War. London: Leo Cooper. ISBN 9780850525045.
- Chesneau, Roger, ed. (1980). Conway's All the World's Fighting Ships 1922–1946. Greenwich, UK: Conway Maritime Press. ISBN 0-85177-146-7.
- Colledge, J. J.; Warlow, Ben (2006) [1969]. Ships of the Royal Navy: The Complete Record of All Fighting Ships of the Royal Navy from the 15th Century to the Present (3rd Rev ed.). London: Chatham Publishing. ISBN 978-1-86176-281-8. OCLC 67375475.
- Lenton, H. T. (1998). British & Empire Warships of the Second World War. Annapolis, Maryland: Naval Institute Press. ISBN 1-55750-048-7.
- Macpherson, Ken; Barrie, Ron (2002). The Ships of Canada's Naval Forces 1910–2002 (3 ed.). St. Catharines, Ontario: Vanwell Publishing. ISBN 1-55125-072-1.
