= List of Liberty ships (H) =

This is a list of Liberty ships with names beginning with H.

== Description ==
The standard Liberty ship (EC-2-S-C1 type) was a cargo ship 441 feet 6 inches (134.57 m) long overall, with a beam of 56 feet 10 3/4 inches (17.34 m). It had a depth of 37 feet 4 inches (11.38 m) and a draft of 26 feet 10 inches (8.18 m). It was powered by a triple expansion steam engine, which had cylinders of 24 1/2 inches (62 cm), 37 inches (94 cm) and 70 inches (180 cm) diameter by 48 inches (120 cm) stroke. The engine produced 2,500ihp at 76rpm. Driving a four-blade propeller 18 feet 6 inches (5.64 m) in diameter, could propel the ship at 11 knots (20 km/h).

Cargo was carried in five holds, numbered 1–5 from bow to stern. Grain capacity was 84,183 cubic feet (2,383.8 m^{3}), 145,604 cubic feet (4,123.0 m^{3}), 96,429 cubic feet (2,730.6 m^{3}), 93,190 cubic feet (2,639 m^{3}) and 93,190 cubic feet (2,639 m^{3}), with a further 49,086 cubic feet (1,390.0 m^{3}) in the deep tanks. Bale capacity was 75,405 cubic feet (2,135.2 m^{3}), 134,638 cubic feet (3,812.5 m^{3}), 83,697 cubic feet (2,370.0 m^{3}), 82,263 cubic feet (2,329.4 m^{3}) and 82,435 cubic feet (2,334.3 m^{3}), with a further 41,135 cubic feet (1,164.8 m^{3}) in the deep tanks.

It carried a crew of 45, plus 36 United States Navy Armed Guard gunners. Later in the war, this was altered to a crew of 52, plus 29 gunners. Accommodation was in a three deck superstructure placed midships. The galley was equipped with a range, a 25 US gallons (95 L) stock kettle and other appliances. Messrooms were equipped with an electric hot plate and an electric toaster.

== Hadley F. Brown ==
Hadley F. Brown was built by New England Shipbuilding Corporation, South Portland, Maine. Her keel was laid on 18 March 1944. She was launched on 29 April and delivered on 15 May. Built for the War Shipping Administration (WSA), she was operated under the management of Mystic Steamship Company. Damaged by a mine off Ostend, Belgium on 20 March 1945 whilst on a voyage from Barry, United Kingdom to Ghent, Belgium. Towed in to Antwerp. She was subsequently repaired. Laid up in the James River post-war, she was scrapped at Philadelphia, Pennsylvania in April 1972.

== Hall J. Kelley ==
Hall J. Kelley was built by Oregon Shipbuilding Corporation, Portland, Oregon. Her keel was laid on 26 January 1943. She was launched on 20 February and delivered on 1 March. Built for the WSA, she was operated under the management of Alaska Transportation Company. Management transferred to Waterman Steamship Corporation, Mobile, Alabama in 1946. Sold to her managers in 1947 and renamed Governor Houston. Sold in 1949 to Firth Steamship Corp., New York and renamed Diddo. Sold in 1958 to Long, Quinn & Boylan Co., New York and renamed Janet Quinn. Sold in 1961 to Amerind Shipping Corp., New York. Sold in 1964 to Janet Quinn Corp., New York. Operated under the management of Earl J. Smith. Sold in 1965 to U.S. Bulk Carriers Inc., New York and renamed U.S. Pecos. Sold in 1966 to Gittel Shipping Corp. and renamed Gittel. Operated under the management of Robert Rodman. She was scrapped at Kaohsiung, Taiwan in June 1968.

== Halton R. Carey ==
Halton R. Carey was built by J. A Jones Construction Company, Brunswick, Georgia. Her keel was laid on 21 December 1944. She was launched on 25 January 1945 and delivered on 7 February. Built for the WSA, she was operated under the management of American Liberty Steamship Co. She was scrapped at Philadelphia in 1963.

== Hamlin Garland ==
Hamlin Garland was built by Southeastern Shipbuilding Corporation, Savannah, Georgia. Her keel was laid on 23 April 1943. She was launched on 6 July and delivered on 24 July. Laid up in the James River post-war, she was scrapped at Cartagena, Spain in July 1972.

== Hannibal Hamlin ==
Hannibal Hamlin was built by New England Shipbuilding Corporation. Her keel was laid on 8 December 1942. She was launched on 5 March 1943 and delivered on 20 March. Laid up at Beaumont, Texas post-war, she was scrapped at Brownsville, Texas in August 1971.

== Hannis Taylor ==
Hannis Taylor was built by North Carolina Shipbuilding Company, Wilmington, North Carolina. Her keel was laid on 8 May 1943. She was launched on 31 May and delivered on 6 June. Laid up in the James River post-war, she was scrapped at Panama City, Florida in April 1972.

== Hans Heg ==
Hans Heg was built by Permanente Metals Corporation, Richmond, California. Her keel was laid on 26 January 1944. She was launched on 14 February and delivered on 22 February. She was scrapped at Seattle, Washington in March 1961.

== Harald Torsvik ==
Harald Torsvik was built by St. Johns River Shipbuilding Company, Jacksonville, Florida. Her keel was laid on 25 September 1944. She was launched as Henry B. Plant on 28 October and delivered as Harald Torsvik on 6 November. To the Norwegian Government under Lend-Lease, under a bareboat charter. Sold in 1946 to D/S A/S Songa, Bergem and renamed Grey County. Operated under the management of Klaus Wiese Hansen. Sold in April 1951 to Compania Navigation del Egeo SA., Panama and renamed Aegean Sailor. Sold in 1960 to Maracecto Compania Navigation SA., Piraeus, Greece and renamed Kyramarouko. Sold in 1964 to Spalmatori Compania Navigation SA., Piraeus and renamed Spalmatori. Operated under the management of Man Lemos. Transferred in 1965 go Spalmatori Compania Maritime SA, Piraeus. Sold in 1966 to Stymfalos SA., Piraeus and renamed Stymfalos. She was scrapped at Kaohsiung in April 1968.

== Harmon Judson ==
Harmon Judson was built by Permanente Metals Corporation. Her keel was laid on 13 August 1943. She was launched as Harmon Judson on 4 September and delivered as Samwash on 13 September. To the Ministry of War Transport (MoWT) under Lend-Lease. Operated under the management of Andrew Weir & Co. Sold in 1947 to The Bank Line and renamed Maplebank, remaining under the same management. Sold in 1957 to West African Navigation Co. and renamed African Lord. Reflagged to Liberia and operated under the management of T. J. Verrando & Co. Management transferred to T. J. Transamerican Steamship Corp. in 1966. She was scrapped at Kaohsiung in April 1969.

== Harold A. Jordan ==
Harold A. Jordan was built by St. Johns River Shipbuilding Company. Her keel was laid on 30 November 1944. She was launched on 6 January 1945 and delivered on 17 January. She was scrapped at Kearny in 1966.

== Harold Dossett ==
Harold Dossett was built by J. A. Jones Construction Company, Brunswick. Her keel was laid on 26 December 1944. She was launched on 30 January 1945 and delivered on 15 February. Built for the WSA, she was operated under the management of Norton Lilly Management Corp. Laid up in the Hudson River post-war, she was scrapped at Santander, Spain in March 1971.

== Harold D. Whitehead ==
Harold D. Whitehead was built by Todd Houston Shipbuilding Corporation, Houston, Texas. Her keel was laid on 3 November 1944. She was launched on 7 December and delivered on 16 December. Built for the WSA, she was operated under the management of Alcoa Steamship Company. Transferred to the United States War Department in 1946. Returned to the WSA later that year and placed under the management of Alaska Steamship Co. Laid up in 1950. Sold in 1951 to Boise Griffin Agencies Corp., New York. Sold in 1954 to Whitehead Shipping Corp., New York. Sold in 1959 to New Hampshire Shipping Corp. and renamed Jackie Hause. Operated under the management of Marinus Inc. Sold in 1960 to Gloria Steamship Co. and renamed Gloria Dunaif. Operated under the management of Cargo Ships & Tankers Inc. Lengthened at Tokyo, Japan in 1960. Now 511 feet 6 inches (155.91 m) long and 8,549 GRT. Renamed Rainbow in 1961. Placed under the management of Suwannee Steamship Co. in 1963. Sold in 1969 to Kentfield Shipping Corp. and renamed Asidos. Operated under the management of Asia Bulk Carriers. She was scrapped at Chittagong, East Pakistan in December 1969.

== Harold H. Brown ==
Harold H. Brown was built by New England Shipbuilding Corporation. Her keel was laid on 16 April 1945. She was launched on 8 June and delivered on 20 June. To the French Government under Lend-Lease. Renamed Pont Audemer in 1946 and placed under the management of Compagnie Générale Transatlantique. Management transferred to Fabre Line in 1961. Sold in 1964 to Charles August Audibert, Monaco and renamed Valfer. Sold in 1965 to Pan African Atlantic Corp. and renamed Vesper. Reflagged to Panama and operated under the management of Oceanic Steamship Co. An engine room explosion on 13 December 1965 set her afire in the Mediterranean Sea (37°00′N 1°38′W) and she was abandoned. She was on a voyage from Marseille, France to Abidjan, Ivory Coast. She was towed in to Cartagena. Declared a constructive total loss, she was scrapped at Cartagena in May 1966.

== Harold I. Pratt ==
Harold I. Pratt was built by New England Shipbuilding Corporation. Her keel was laid on 8 June 1944. She was launched on 29 June and delivered on 18 August. Laid up at Beaumont post-war, she was scrapped at Brownsville in November 1970.

== Harold L. Winslow ==
Harold L. Winslow was built by Bethlehem Fairfield Shipyard, Baltimore, Maryland. Her keel was laid on 23 September 1943. She was launched on 16 October and delivered on 25 October. Converted to a depot ship in 1964 and used as a pier and floating warehouse at Nikishka, Alaska.

== Harold O. Wilson ==
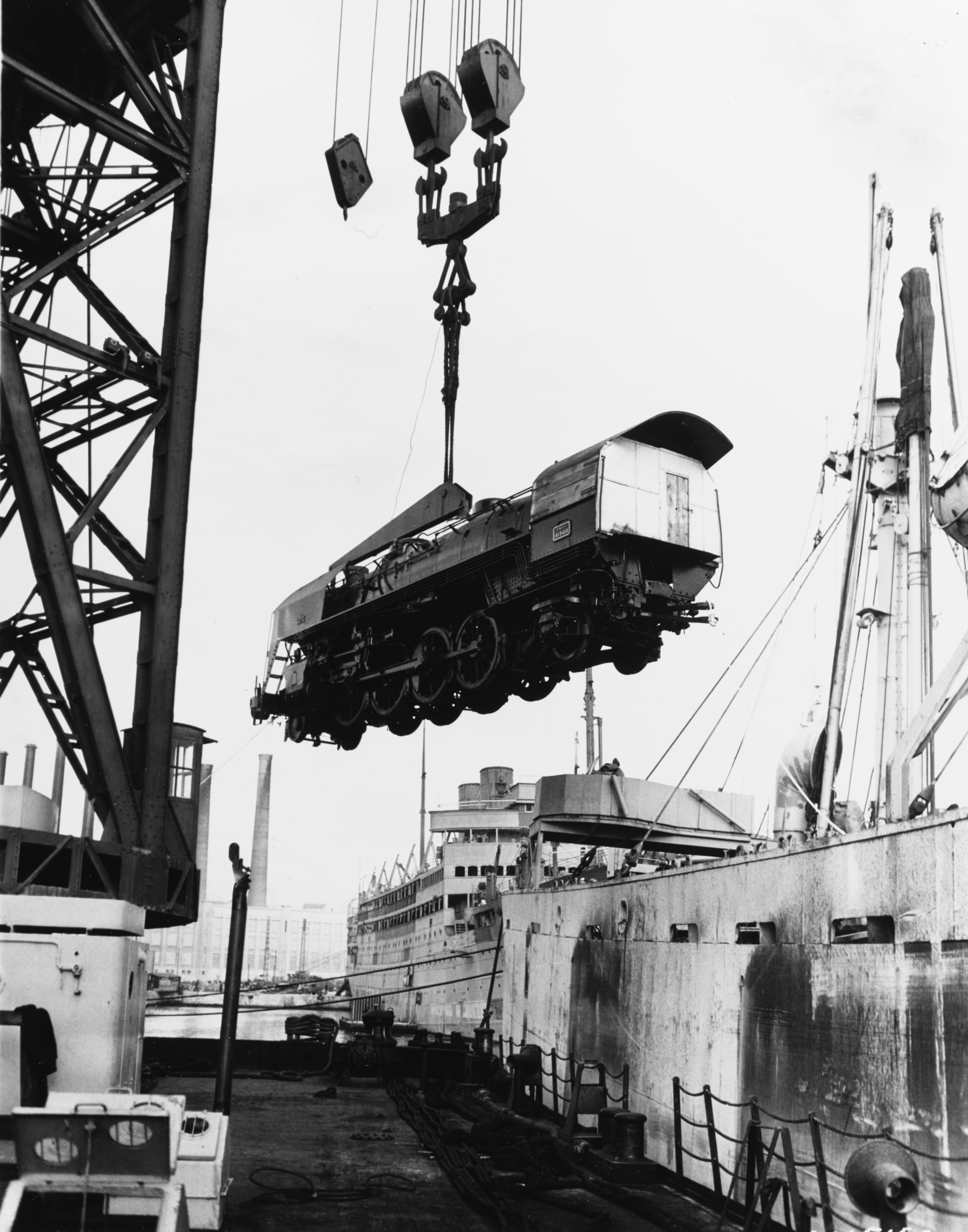
Harold O. Wilson

Harold O. Wilson was built by J. A. Jones Construction Company, Brunswick. Her keel was laid on 12 December 1944. She was launched on 12 January 1945 and delivered on 24 January. Built for the WSA, she was operated under the management of United States Navigation Co. Sold in 1947 to Northeastern Steamship Corp and renamed North Beacon. Operated under the management of Orion Shipping and Trading Co. Sold in 1955 to Bethlehem Steel Corp. and renamed Texmar. Initially operated under the management of Ore Navigation Corp., but management transferred to Calmar Steamship Corp. later that year. She ran aground and broke in two off Grays Harbour, Washington on 30 December 1960 whilst on a voyage from Seattle to New York and was a total loss. Both parts were refloated in October 1961. They were towed to Aberdeen, Washington and scrapped.

== Harold T. Andrews ==
Harold T. Andrews was built by J. A. Jones Construction Company, Panama City. Her keel was laid on 15 November 1943. She was launched on 28 December and delivered on 19 February 1944. Built for the WSA, she was operated under the management of Boland & Cornelius. Laid up in 1946. Sold in 1949 to Astra Steamship Corp. Operated under the management of Overseas Navigation Corp. Sold in 1957 to Bassa Transportation Corp. and renamed Bassa. Reflagged to Liberia and operated under the same management. Renamed Spiros Makris later that year, then Robertville in 1958. Sold in 1959 to Enterprise Steamship Corp. and renamed Valiant Enterprise. Reflagged to the United States and operated under the management of Ocean Carriers Corp. Abandoned by her owners at Colombo, Ceylon in 1960. Arrested on 12 December. Sold to Japanese shipbreakers in 1966 but not allowed to sail due to outstanding port fees of Rs400,000. Towed to a position 6 nautical miles (11 km) north of Colombo on 23 February 1967 and allowed to sink.

== Harriet Beecher Stowe ==
Harriet Beecher Stowe was built by New England Shipbuilding Corporation. Her keel was laid on 6 April 1943. She was launched on 24 May and delivered on 7 June. She was scrapped at Panama City, Florida in October 1967.

== Harriet Hosmer ==
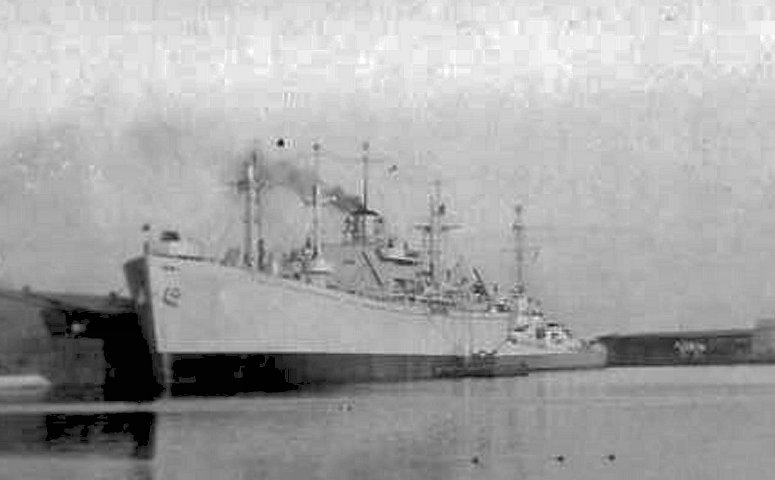
USS Luna

Harriet Hosmer was built by J. A. Jones Construction Company, Panama City. Her keel was laid on 23 April 1943. She was launched as Harriet Hosmer on 30 September and delivered to the United States Navy as Luna on 25 October. Converted for naval use by Tampa Shipbuilding Company, Tampa, Florida. Laid up in reserve at Pearl Harbor, Hawaii in April 1947. Towed to San Francisco in May 1947. Returned to WSA and renamed Harriet Hosmer. Laid up in Suisun Bay. She was scrapped at Richmond in May 1965.

== Harriet Monroe ==
Harriet Monroe was built by Permanente Metals Corporation. Her keel was laid on 15 December 1943. She was launched on 11 January 1944 and delivered on 15 February. Built for the WSA, she was operated under the management of Mississippi Shipping Co. Sold in 1947 to Navigazione Alta Italia, Genoa, Italy and renamed Montello. Sold in 1960 to International Navigation Corp. and renamed Middle River. Reflagged to Liberia and operated under the management of W. H. Muller & Co. Sold in 1962 to Elvira Co. Inc. and renamed Loussios. Remained under the Liberian flag and operated under the management of A. S. Saferiades. She was sold for scrapping at Whampoa Dock, Hong Kong in 1968. Suffered issues with her boilers, engine and steering gear during her delivery voyage in January 1969 and was resold to Hong Kong shipbreakers.

== Harriet Tubman ==
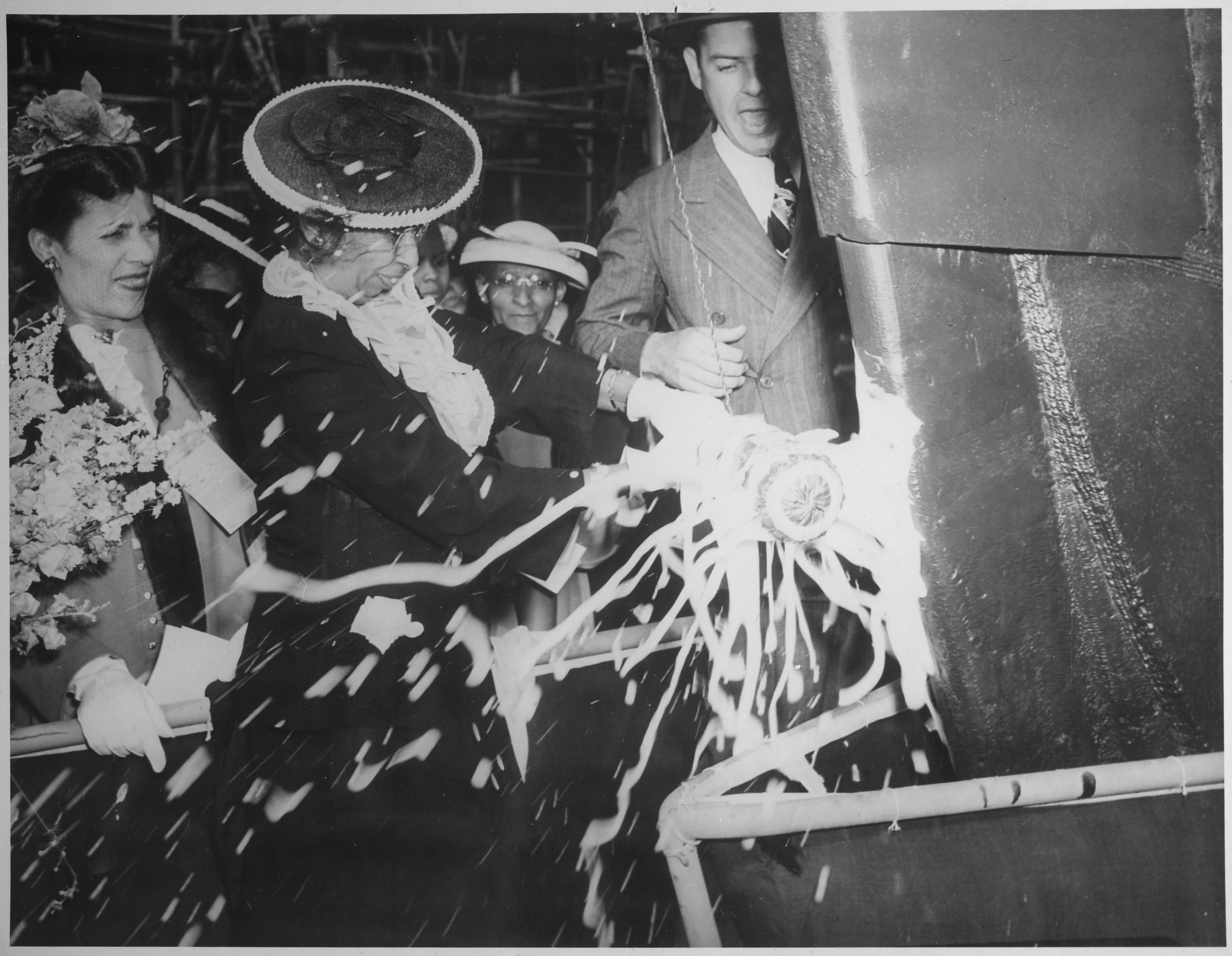
Launching party for Harriet Tubman.

Harriet Tubman was built by New England Shipbuilding Corporation. Her keel was laid on 19 April 1944. She was launched on 3 June and delivered on 13 June. Laid up at Beaumont post-war, she was sold to Houston shipbreakers in October 1972.

== Harrington Emerson ==
Harrington Emerson was built by Oregon Shipbuilding Corporation. Her keel was laid on 16 December 1943. She was launched on 29 December and delivered on 8 January 1944. She ran aground and was wrecked at Okinawa, Japan in a typhoon on 9 October 1945. Reported sold and scrapped in 1948.

== Harrison Gray Otis ==
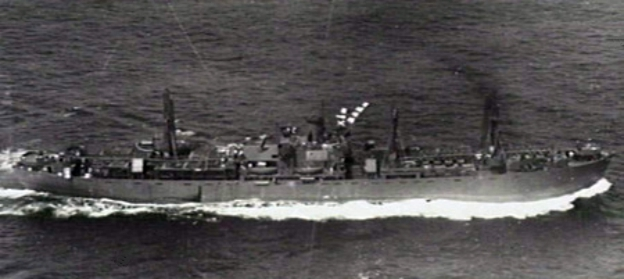
Harrison Gray Otis

Harrison Gray Otis was built by California Shipbuilding Corporation. Her keel was laid on 4 December 1942. She was launched on 3 January 1943 and delivered on 17 January. Built for the WSA, she was operated under the management of American-Hawaiian Steamship Company. She was damaged by an Italian limpet mine at Gibraltar on 4 August 1943 and was beached. She was cut in two in 1949. The bow section was towed to Cádiz, Spain for scrapping on 5 July 1949. The stern section was towed to Cartagena for scrapping on 28 September 1950.

== Harry A. Garfield ==
Harry A. Garfield was built by New England Shipbuilding Corporation. Her keel was laid on 24 May 1943. She was launched as Harry A. Garfield on 23 July. Completed as Belgian Dynasty, she was delivered on 31 July. To the Belgian Government under Lend-Lease. Sold in 1947 to Compagnie Maritime Belge and renamed Capitaine Frankignoul. Operated under the management of Agence Maritime International. Sold in 1959 to Ausonia di Navigazione di Fratelli Ravano di Alberto, Genoa, Italy and renamed Honestas. Sold in 1964 to Feliz Compania Navigation, Panama and renamed Master Elias. Ran aground on Burias Island, Philippines (12°49′N 123°17′E) on 11 March 1963 whilst on a voyage from a Japanese port to Manila, Philippines. She was refloated on 15 March and towed in to Manila in a damaged condition. She was scrapped at Hirao, Japan in August 1965.

== Harry Kirby ==
Harry Kirby was built by Southeastern Shipbuilding Corporation. Her keel was laid on 14 December 1944. She was launched on 20 January 1945 and delivered on 7 February. Built for the WSA, she was operated under the management of Blidberg Rothchild Company. Sold in 1949 to Standard Steamship Company, Dover, Delaware and renamed Christine. Sold in 1950 to Oceanwave Steamship Corp. and renamed Seaveteran. Sold later that year to Oceanways Steamship Corp. and placed under the management of Orion Shipping & Trading Corp. Sold in 1953 to Pangolfo Compania Armamente and renamed Kaparia. Reflagged to Panama. Sold in 1954 to Nueva Granada Compania Armamente and renamed Portaria. Operated under the management of Goulandris. Sold in 1962 to Cosmos Shipping Corp., Hong Kong. Remaining under the Panamanian flag. Placed under the management of Marine Industries Corp. in 1963. Ran aground on the Madaira Reef (28°55′N 48°47′E) on 8 July 1966 but was refloated She was scrapped at Kaohsiung in September 1969.

== Harry Lane ==
Harry Lane was built by Oregon Shipbuilding Corporation. Her keel was laid on 4 July 1942. She was launched on 11 August and delivered on 23 August. She was scrapped at Baltimore in March 1962.

== Harry Leon Wilson ==
Harry Leon Wilson was built by Permanente Metals Corporation. Her keel was laid on 15 October 1943. She was launched on 11 November and delivered on 19 November. Built for the WSA, she was operated under the management of Coastwise Line. Sold in 1947 to Pateras Bros., Chios, Greece and renamed Costantis. Placed under the management of Falafios Ltd. in 1954. Sold in 1967 to Marmerito Compania Navigation, Panama and renamed Aragon. Reflagged to Somalia and operated under the management of Costas Papadimitrou. Sold in 1969 to Aragon Shipping Co. Ltd. Reflagged to Cyprus and operated under the management of Pateras Bros., Piraeus and Famagusta, Cyprus. Collided with the Bulgarian tanker Hydrophane in the Strait of Dover (51°10′N 1°36′E) on 11 February 1971 whilst on a voyage from Cuba to Rostock, East Germany. Declared uneconomic to repair, she was scrapped at Hamburg, West Germany in March 1971.

== Harry L. Glucksman ==
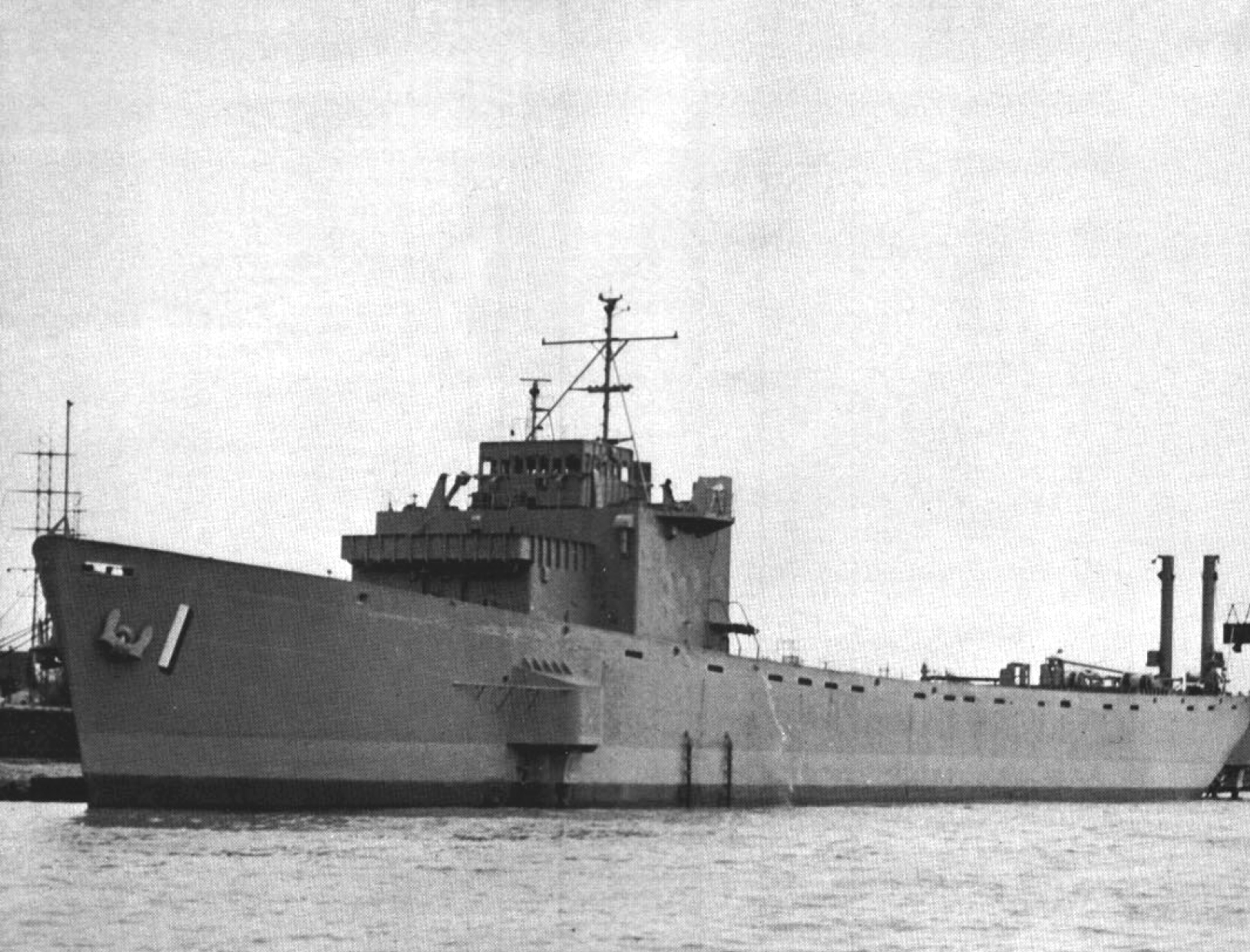
USS Harry L. Glucksman

Harry L. Glucksman was built by Southeastern Shipbuilding Corporation. Her keel was laid on 18 March 1944. She was launched on 29 April and delivered on 20 May. Built for the WSA, she was operated under the management of Merchants & Miners Transportation Co. Chartered by Isthmian Steamship Company in November 1946. Laid up in reserve at Wilmington, North Carolina in May 1948. Operated by the United States Navigation Company between November 1951 and June 1952 under agency terms, then laid up in reserve at Wilmington, North Carolina. Chartered to American Coal Shipping Co. in November 1956. Laid up in reserve in the James River in March 1958. She arrived at Erie, Pennsylvania on 22 September 1966 to be stripped to a bare hull. Subsequently towed to Lorain, Ohio and converted to a minesweeper for the United States Navy. Entered service in August 1969. She was scrapped at Brownsville in August 1976.

== Harry Percy ==
Harry Percy was built by Todd Houston Shipbuilding Corporation. Her keel was laid on 11 November 1943. She was launched on 18 December and delivered on 30 December. Built for the WSA, she was operated under the management of States Marine Corp. sold in 1947 to Commercial & Shipowning Co., Athens and renamed Ira. Operated under the management of P. Argyropoulos. She ran aground on the Goodwin Sands on 7 March 1947 whilst on a voyage from the Hampton Roads, Virginia to Antwerp. She broke in two and was a total loss.

== Harry Toulmin ==
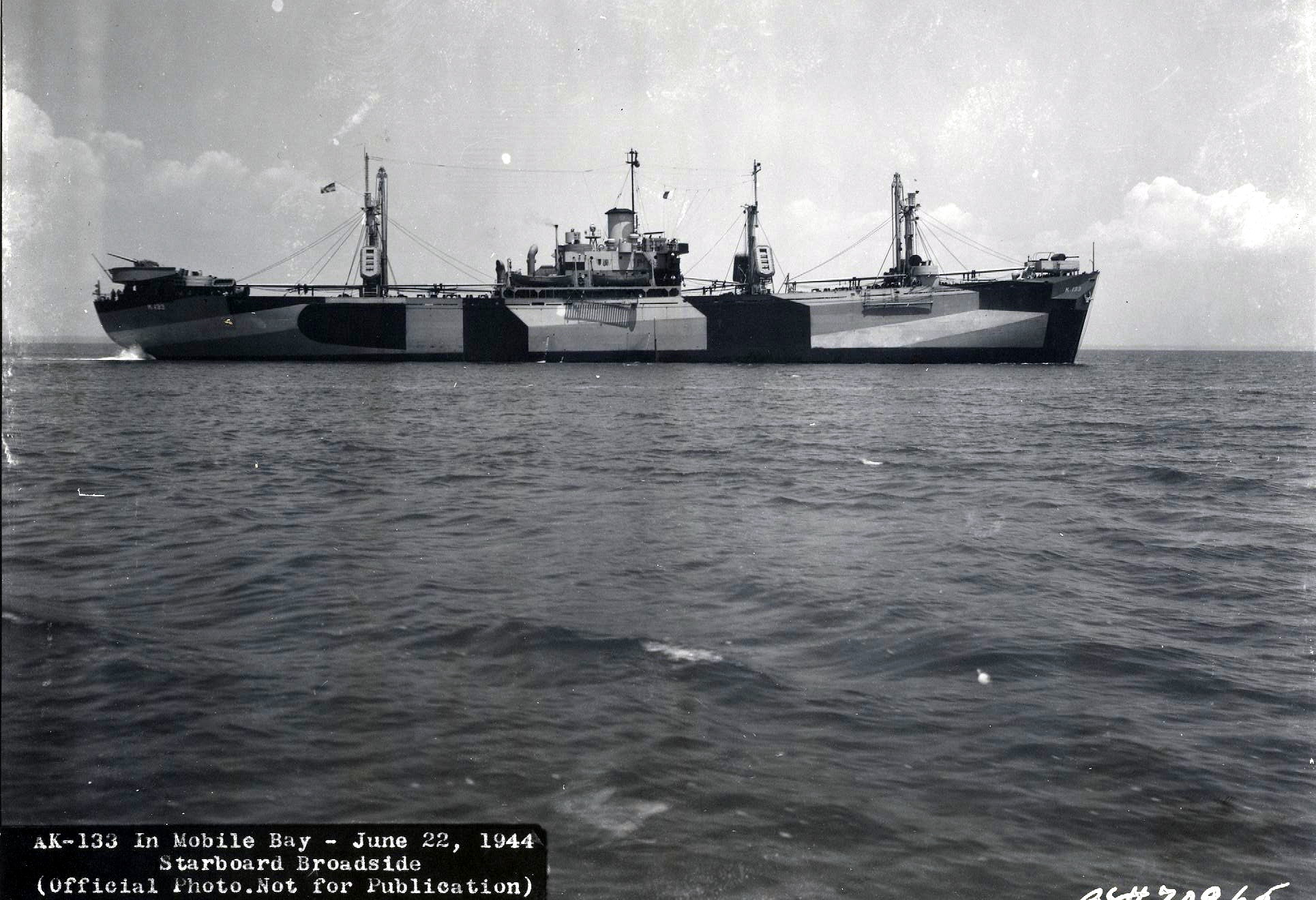
USS Seginus

Harry Toulmin was built by Delta Shipbuilding Company. Her keel was laid on 10 January 1944. She was launched as Harry Toulmin on 4 March and delivered to the United States Navy as Seginus on 12 April. Converted for naval use at the Waterman Steamship Company's yard at Mobile. To WSA in November 1945 and renamed Harry Toulmin. Laid up in reserve at Suisun Bay. Sold in 1947 to Thomas N. Epiphaniades Steamship Co. Piraeus and renamed Kehrea. She was scrapped at Shanghai, China in October 1967.

== Hart Crane ==
Hart Crane was built by California Shipbuilding Corporation. Her keel was laid on 25 November 1943. She was launched on 22 December and delivered on 7 January 1944. Built for the WSA, she was operated under the management of Alcoa Steamship Company. Lent to the French Government in 1946 and renamed Valognes. Transferred to the French Government in 1947, operated under the management of Compagnie Générale Transatlantique. Sold in 1954 to Giorgio Parodi, Genoa and renamed Richetto Parodi. Sold in 1955 to Emmanuele V. Parodi, Genoa. Sold in 1957 to Dr. Giorgio Parodi. Operated under the management of Società per Azioni Emanuele V. Parod. Sold in 1958 to Ditta Enrico Parodi, remaining under the same management. She was scrapped at Savona, Italy in January 1966.

== Harvey C. Miller ==
Harvey C. Miller was built by Todd Houston Shipbuilding Corporation. Her keel was laid on 11 August 1943. She was launched on 28 September and delivered on 12 October. She was scrapped at Hirao in February 1960.

== Harvey Cushing ==
Harvey Cushing was built by St. Johns River Shipbuilding Company. Her keel was laid on 5 September 1943. She was launched on 31 October and delivered on 11 November. Built for the WSA, she was operated under the management of Marine Transport Lines. Sold in 1947 to Fratelli d'Amico, Rome, Italy and renamed Eretto. Ran aground near Uglegorsk, Soviet Union on 20 September 1965 whilst on a voyage from Tanoura, Japan to Vancouver. Declared a constructive total loss, she was refloated in October and towed in to Sovetskaya Gavan. No further trace, presumed scrapped.

== Harvey W. Scott ==
Harvey W. Scott was built by Oregon Shipbuilding Corporation. Her keel was laid on 4 June 1942. She was launched on 19 July and delivered on 30 July. Built for the WSA, she was operated under the management of Grace Line. She was torpedoed and sunk in the Indian Ocean (31°54′S 30°37′E) by U-160 on 3 March 1943 whilst on a voyage from New York to Bandar Shapur, Iran.

== Harvey W. Wiley ==
Harvey W. Wiley was a tanker built by California Shipbuilding Corporation. She was completed in October 1943. Built for the WSA, she was operated under the management of Pacific Tankers Corp. Sold in 1948 to Coastwise Bulk Carriers Inc., San Francisco. Sold in 1950 to Palmer Shipping Corp., New York. Sold in 1951 to Olympia Oil Co. and renamed Mandoh. Operated under the management of her former owner. Management transferred to National Shipping & Trading Co. later that year. Sold in 1954 to Olympia Oil Co. and renamed National Fortune. Reflagged to Liberia, remaining under the same management. Converted to a cargo ship at Amsterdam, Netherlands in 1955. Now 7,309 GRT. Lengthened at Kure, Japan later that year. Now 511 feet 6 inches (155.91 m) and 8,435 GRT. Sold in 1961 to Hellenic Shipping & Industries, Piraeus and renamed Evvia. Sold in 1968 to Sareha Shipping Lines and renamed Blue Surf. Reflagged to Liberia and placed under the management of Miles Santos. She was scrapped at Sakaide, Japan in October 1969.

== Hawkins Fudske ==
Hawkins Fudske was built by Bethlehem Fairfield Shipyard. Her keel was laid on 18 August 1943. She was launched on 11 September and delivered on 20 September. She was scrapped at Mobile in November 1969.

== Haym Solomon ==
Haym Solomon was a limited troop carrier built by Bethlehem Fairfield Shipyard. Her keel was laid on 18 April 1943. She was launched on 17 May and delivered on 27 May. Built for the WSA, she was operated under the management of Luckenbach Steamship Co., Inc. Sold in 1946 to Constantin Konialidis, Montevideo, Uruguay and renamed Aristopais. Sold in 1947 to Sociedad Armamente Aristomenis, Panama. Reflagged to Honduras. Sold in 1951 to Compagnie Maritime Congolaise, Belgium and renamed Captiaine Brognion. Operated under the management of Agence Maritime Internationale. Sold in 1960 to Compagnie Maritime Belge, remaining under the same management. Sold in 1963 to Sovtorgflot, Odesa, Soviet Union and renamed Karpaty. She was scrapped at Split, Yugoslavia in December 1969.

== Heber M. Creel ==
Heber M. Creel was built by Permanente Metals Corporation. Her keel was laid on 21 November 1943. She was launched on 13 December and delivered on 22 December. She was scrapped at Seattle in December 1961.

== Hecla ==
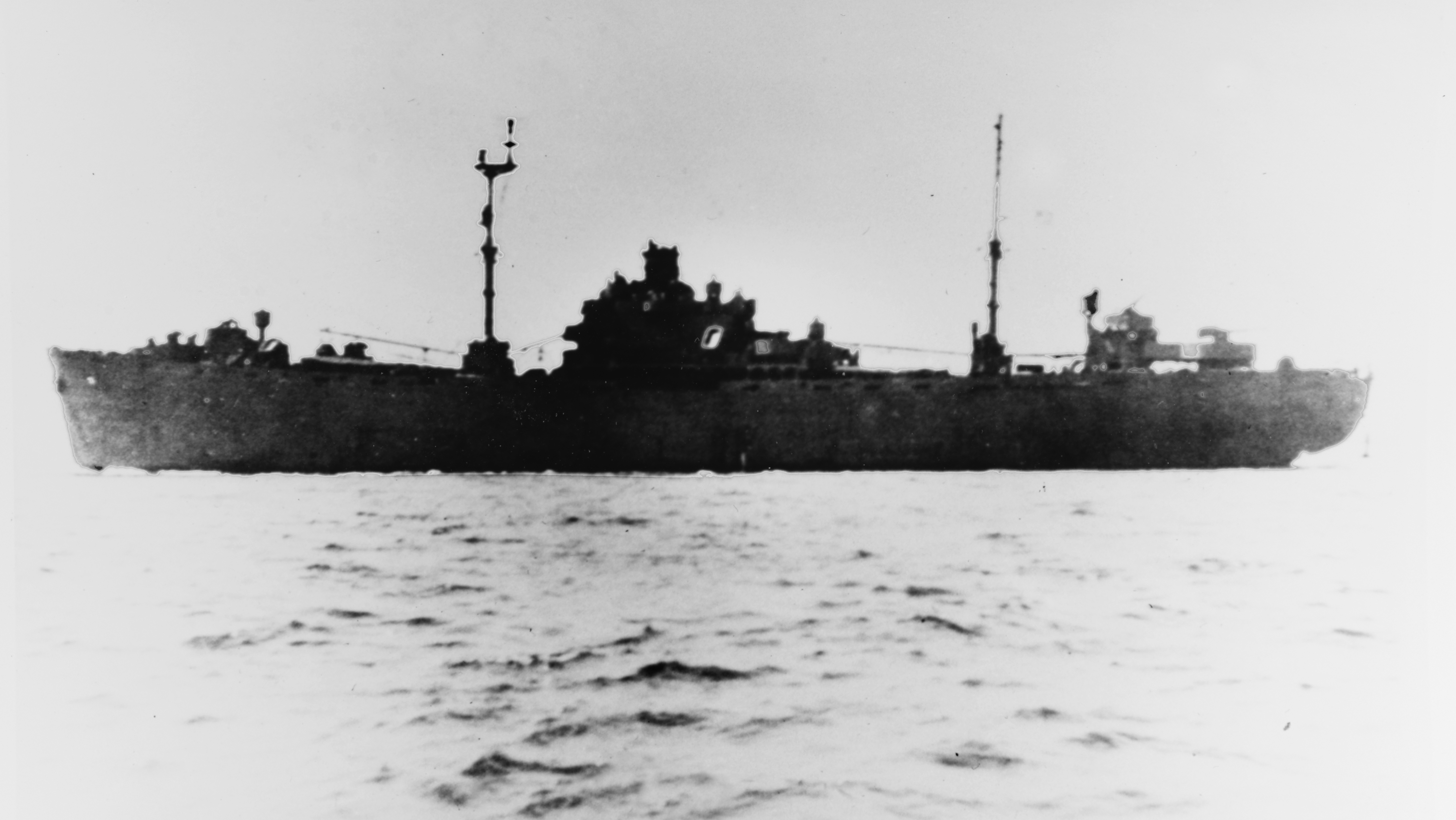
USS Xanthus

Hecla was built by Bethlehem Fairfield Shipyards. Her keel was laid on 27 June 1944. She was launched on 31 July and delivered on 16 August. Intended for transfer to the Royal Navy as Hecla, but retained by the United States Navy and renamed Xanthus. Laid up in reserve in the James River in 1946. Transferred to the United States Maritime Administration (MARAD) in 1962. Sold to shipbreakers in Cleveland, Ohio in July 1974.

== Helen Hunt Jackson ==
Helen Hunt Jackson was built by California Shipbuilding Corporation. Her keel was laid on 24 October 1942. She was launched on 23 November and delivered on 12 December. Laid up in the James River post-war she was scrapped at Kearny in July 1971.

== Helena Modjeska ==
Helena Modjeska was built by Delta Shipbuilding Company. Her keel was laid on 25 September 1944. She was launched on 6 November and delivered on 25 November. She ran aground on the Goodwin Sands on 12 September 1946 whilst on a voyage from Marseille to Bremerhaven, Germany and broke in two. The stern section was refloated on 23 October and beached in Sandwich Bay. The bow section was refloated on 28 October and beached at Deal, United Kingdom. It was towed to the River Blackwater on 10 January 1947, and was joined by the stern section on 10 June. Subsequently scrapped at Grays Thurrock, United Kingdom.

== Hellas ==
Hellas was built by New England Shipbuilding Corporation. Her keel was laid down on 19 July 1943. She was launched as William De Witt Hyde on 31 August and delivered as Hellas on 17 September. To the Greek Government under Lend-Lease. Sold in 1947 to George C. Lemos, Chios. On 8 March 1953, she participated in the search for survivors from the Egyptian minesweeper Sollum, which had foundered 12 nautical miles (22 km) off Alexandria. She was scrapped at Hirao in November 1968.

== Henderson Luelling ==
Henderson Luelling was built by Oregon Shipbuilding Corporation. Her keel was laid on 2 February 1943. She was launched on 25 February and delivered on 8 March. She was scrapped at Hirao in August 1959.

== Hendrik Willem Van Loon ==
Hendrik Willem Van Loon was built by St. Johns River Shipbuilding Corporation. Her keel was laid on 5 May 1944. She was launched on 14 June and delivered on 2 July. She was scrapped at Portland, Oregon in May 1965.

== Henry Adams ==
Henry Adams was built by Permanente Metals Corporation. Her keel was laid on 10 February 1944. She was launched on 10 March and delivered on 4 April. Built of the WSA, she was operated under the management of Pacific-Atlantif Steamship Co. Sold in 1947 to States Steamship Co, Vancouver, Washington and renamed Washington. Sold in 1949 to Universal Cargo Carriers Corp. and renamed Catherine M. Goulandris. Operated under the management of Orion Shipping & Trading Co. Sold in 1954 to Adams Steamship Corp, Wilmington. Placed under the management of Suwannee Steamship Co. Sold in 1956 to Universal Cargo Carriers Corp. Operated under the management of Orion Shipping & Trading Co. Sold in 1957 to Pisac Compania Navigation, Panama and renamed Andros Lady. Reflagged to Liberia, remaining under the same management. Sold later that year to Jackson Steamship Co. Operated under the management of Suwannee Steamship Co. Sold in 1962 to Seaforth Shipping Corp. Operated under the management of Orion Shipping & Trading Co. She was scrapped at Inverkeithing, United Kingdom in April 1963.

== Henry Austin ==
Henry Austin was built by Todd Houston Shipbuilding Corporation. Her keel was laid on 16 October 1943. She was launched on 26 November and delivered on 8 December. She was scrapped at Tacoma in October 1964.

== Henry Bacon ==
Henry Bacon was built by North Carolina Shipbuilding Company. Her keel was laid on 29 September 1942. She was launched on 11 November and delivered on 24 November. Built for the WSA, she was operated under the management of South Atlantic Steamship Co. Torpedoed and sunk in the Barents Sea (67°38′N 5°00′W) by enemy aircraft on 23 February 1945 whilst on a voyage from the Kola Inlet to Loch Ewe.

== Henry Baldwin ==
Henry Baldwin was built by California Shipbuilding Corporation. Her keel was laid on 13 September 1942. She was launched on 18 October and delivered on 5 November. Laid up in the Hudson River post-war, she was scrapped at Kearny in December 1970.

== Henry Barnard ==
Henry Barnard was built by Oregon Shipbuilding Corporation. Her keel was laid on 7 November 1942. She was launched on 2 December and delivered on 11 December. She was scrapped at Mobile in December 1961.

== Henry B. Brown ==
Henry B. Brown was built by Bethlehem Fairfield Shipyard. Her keel was laid on 15 December 1942. She was launched on 28 January 1943 and delivered on 17 February. She was scrapped at Philadelphia in March 1965.

== Henry Bergh ==
Henry Bergh was a troop transport built by Permanente Metals Corporation. Her keel was laid on 29 April 1943. She was launched on 28 May and delivered on 14 June. Built for the WSA, she was operated under the management of Norton Lilly Corp. She ran aground in the Farallon Islands, California on 31 May 1944, broke her back and was wrecked. All 1,400 people on board were rescued. She subsequently broke in three and sank.

== Henry B. Plant (I) ==
See the entry for Harald Torsvik.

== Henry B. Plant (II) ==
Henry B. Plant was built by St. Johns River Shipbuilding Corporation. Her keel was laid on 9 November 1944. She was launched on 11 December and delivered on 19 December. Built for the WSA, she was operated under the management of A. L. Burbank & Co. Torpedoed and sunk in the North Sea 17 nautical miles (31 km) east of Ramsgate, United Kingdom by U-245 on 6 February 1945 whilst on a voyage from New York to Antwerp.

== Henry C. Payne ==
Henry C. Payne was built by Permanente Metals Corporation. Her keel was laid on 2 September 1943. She was launched on 22 September and delivered on 30 September. Built for the WSA, she was operated under the management of American-Hawaiian Steamship Co. Sold in 1947 to Raggruppamento Armatori Molin & Meotto, Venice, Italy and renamed Rialto. Sold in 1952 to Compania Armartoriale Italiana, Venice. Later placed under the management of Runciman Ltd. She was scrapped at Trieste, Italy in February 1967.

== Henry C. Wallace ==
Henry C. Wallace was a tanker built by California Shipbuilding Corporation. She was completed in September 1943. Built for the WSA, she was operated under the management of Los Angeles Tanker Operators Inc. Laid up in Suisun Bay in 1945. Sold in 1951 to Paco Tankers Inc. Operated under the management of Keystone Shipping Inc. Sold in 1954 to Theatre Navigation Corp. and renamed Trocadero. Reflagged to Liberia and operated under the management of Rector Shipping Co. Sold in 1955 to Seatankers Inc. and renamed Percy Jordan. Converted to a cargo ship at Kure in 1956. Now 511 feet 6 inches (155.91 m) long and 8,494 GRT. Sold in 1960 to Argyll Shipping Co., Hamilton, Bermuda. Reflagged to the United Kingdom. Sold in 1965 to Gamps Marine Financing and renamed California Sun. Reflagged to Liberia and operated under the management of Pacific Steamship Agency. Caught fire following an engine room explosion on 16 November 1967 off the Nicobar Islands whilst on a voyage from Belekeri, India to West Germany. Abandoned by her crew, she was towed in to Mahé, Seychelles by the Indian cargo ship Jalarajan. Declared a constructive total loss.

== Henry Clay ==
Henry Clay was built by Alabama Drydock Company, Mobile. She was completed in June 1942. She was scrapped at Kearny in August 1967.

== Henry Dearborn ==
Henry Dearborn was built by Oregon Shipbuilding Corporation. Her keel was laid on 7 September 1942. She was launched on 8 October and delivered on 18 October. She was scrapped at Portland, Maine in December 1959.

== Henry D. Lindsley ==
Henry D. Lindsley was built by Todd Houston Shipbuilding Corporation. Her keel was laid on 23 March 1944. She was launched on 3 May and delivered on 15 May. Laid up in the James River post-war, she was scrapped at Bilbao, Spain in October 1970.

== Henry Dodge ==
Henry Dodge was built by Permanente Metals Corporation. Her keel was laid on 4 June 1943. She was launched on 25 June and delivered on 7 July. Built for the WSA, she was operated under the management of Waterman Steamship Corp. Sold in 1947 to Pasquale Mazzella, Naples and renamed Giovanni Amendola. Sold in 1961 to San Antonio Inc. and renamed Alheli. Reflagged to the Lebanon and operated under the management of Runciman & Co. Abandoned in a sinking condition in the Atlantic Ocean 900 nautical miles (1,700 km) east of Bermuda on 22 April 1968 whilst on a voyage from Almería, Spain to Wilmington, Delaware, United States. She sank on 24 April (33°15′N 45°50′W).

== Henry D. Thoreau ==
Henry D. Thoreau was built by Oregon Shipbuilding Corporation. Her keel was laid on 23 February 1942. She was launched on 16 April and delivered on 13 May. Laid up at Beaumont post-war, she was scrapped at Brownsville in October 1972.

== Henry Durant ==
Henry Durant was built by Marinship Corporation, Sausalito, California. Her keel was laid on 11 May 1943. She was launched on 15 June and delivered on 13 July. She was scrapped at Portland, Oregon in March 1963.

== Henry E. Huntington ==
Henry E. Huntington was built by California Shipbuilding Corporation. Her keel was laid on 28 December 1943. She was launched on 27 January 1944 and delivered on 12 February. She was scrapped at Tacoma in October 1961.

== Henry Failing ==
Henry Failing was built by Oregon Shipbuilding Corporation. Her keel was laid on 19 March 1943. She was launched on 7 April and delivered on 15 April. She was scrapped at Everett, Washington in July 1961.

== Henry George ==
Henry George was built by Oregon Shipbuilding Corporation. Her keel was laid on 23 August 1942. She was launched on 25 September and delivered on 5 October. Built for the WSA, she was operated under the management of American-Hawaiian Steamship Co. To the French Government in 1946. Operated under the management of Compagnie Messageries Maritimes. Renamed Grenoble in 1947. Sold in 1961 to St. James Line Co. and renamed Saint James. Reflagged to Panama and operated under the management of Galbraith, Pembroke & Co. Renamed Esperance in 1966. She was scrapped at Kaohsiung in 1968.

== Henry Gilbert Costin ==
Henry Gilbert Costin was built by Bethlehem Fairfield Shipyard. Her keel was laid on 23 January 1943. She was launched on 9 March and delivered on 23 March. Built for the WSA, she was operated under the management of Cosmopolitan Shipping Co. Management transferred to Fribourg Steamship Co. in 1948. Laid up at Beaumont in 1949. Sold in 1951 to Arrow Steamship Co., New York and renamed Feuer. Sold in 1952 to Bulk Transport, Panama and renamed Evy. Reflagged to Liberia and operated under the management of Contiship Corp. Sold in 1958 to Aphrodite Steamship Corp. and renamed Valiant Faith. Reflagged to the United States and operated under the management of Ocean Carriers Corp. Sold in 1959 to Lib Steamship Corp, remaining under the same management. Sold in 1961 to Phoenix Steamship Corp. and renamed Hermioni. Reflagged to Greece and operated under the management of Mar-Trade Corp. Sold in 1963 to Jayanti Shipping Co., Bombay, India and London, United Kingdom and renamed Arya Jayanti. Reflagged to India. She was scrapped at Bombay in December 1966.

== Henry Groves Connor ==
Henry Groves Connor, probably in the Scheldt

Henry Groves Connor was a limited troop carrier built by Delta Shipbuilding Company. Her keel was laid on 9 March 1943. She was launched on 16 April and delivered on 30 April. Built for the WSA, she was operated under the management of Standard Fruit Co. Sold in 1947 to Constantin Konialidis, Montevideo and renamed Aristides. Sold later that year to Sociedad Armamente Aristomenis Panama SA., Panama. Reflagged to Honduras. Placed under the management of Olympic Maritime SA in 1955. Reflagged to Liberia in 1958. Sold in 1966 to Balboa Marine SA, Panama. Remaining under the Liberian flag and operated under the management of Central American Steamship Agency. She was scrapped at Hong Kong in October 1969.

== Henry Hadley ==
Henry Hadley was built by St. Johns River Shipbuilding Corporation. Her keel was laid on 26 June 1944. She was launched on 8 August and delivered on 22 August. Laid up at Mobile post-war, she was scrapped at Panama City, Florida in June 1972.

== Henry H. Blood ==
Henry H. Blood was built by Permanente Metals Corporation. Her keel was laid on 29 September 1943. She was launched on 17 October and delivered on 27 October. She was scrapped at Baltimore in August 1961.

== Henry H. Richardson ==
Henry H. Richardson was built by Permanente Metals Corporation. Her keel was laid on 4 February 1943. She was launched on 13 March and delivered on 27 March. She was scrapped at Philadelphia in April 1960.

== Henry H. Sibley ==
Henry H. Sibley was built by California Shipbuilding Corporation. Her keel was laid on 17 February 1943. She was launched on 16 March and delivered on 31 March. Built for the WSA, she was operated under the management of American Foreign Steamship Corp. Sold in 1947 to Hector C. Dracoulis, Athens and renamed Asteris. Sold in 1965 to Trade & Transport Inc. and renamed Pericles G.C. Reflagged to Panama and operated under the management of Brokerage & Management Corp. She was scrapped at Hong Kong in October 1968.

== Henry Jocelyn ==
Henry Jocelyn was built by New England Shipbuilding Corporation. Her keel was laid on20 June 1943. She was launched on 15 August and delivered on 28 August. Laid up in the James River post-war, she arrived at Gandia for scrapping in January 1973.

== Henry J. Raymond ==
Henry J. Raymond was built by Permanente Metals Corporation. Her keel was laid on 11 November 1942. She was launched on 17 December and delivered on 26 December. Laid up at Beaumont post-war, she was scrapped at Brownsville in October 1972.

== Henry J. Waters ==
Henry J. Waters was built by Permanente Metals Corporation. Her keel as laid on 13 April 1944. She was launched as Henry J. Waters on 30 April and delivered as Rodina on 8 May. To the Soviet Union. She was scrapped in the Soviet Union in 1973.

== Henry Knox ==
Henry Knox was built by California Shipbuilding Corporation. Her keel was laid on 17 November 1941. She was launched on 6 March 1942 and delivered on 13 May. Built for the WSA, she was operated under the management of Matson Navigation Co. Torpedoed and sunk off the Maldive Islands (0°01′S 71°15′E) on 19 June 1943 by I-37 whilst on a voyage from Philadelphia to Bandar Shapur.

== Henry L. Abbott ==
Henry L. Abbott was built by Oregon Shipbuilding Corporation. Her keel was laid on 24 July 1943. She was launched on 12 August and delivered on 19 August. Built for the WSA, she was operated under the management of Alaska Transportation Co. Driven ashore in a typhoon at Hong Kong on 7 September 1949. Later refloated and declared a constructive total loss. Sold to Chinese shipbreakers in 1950. Intercepted by Chinese Nationalist Navy warships 180 nautical miles (330 km) off Keelung, Taiwan on 26 September 1950 whilst being towed to Shanghai and was cast adrift. Towed in to Keelung on 4 October. Released on 24 August 1951 and towed to Hong Kong. She was scrapped at Hong Kong in September 1951.

== Henry L. Benning ==
Henry L. Benning was built by Bethlehem Fairfield Shipyard. Her keel was laid on 12 January 1943. She was launched on 22 February and delivered on 9 March. Built for the WSA, she was operated under the management of Cosmopolitan Shipping Co. Laid up at Wilmington, North Carolina in 1946. Sold in 1951 to A. H. Bull Steamship Co., New York and renamed Dorothy. Renamed Emma in 1961. Sold in 1963 to Jayanti Shipping Co., Bombay & London and renamed Nanak Jayanti. Reflagged to India. She was scrapped at Bombay in December 1967.

== Henry L. Ellsworth ==
Henry L. Ellsworth was a tanker built by Delta Shipbuilding Company. Her keel was laid on 15 July 1942. She was launched on 2 September and delivered on 12 November. Built for the WSA, she was operated under the management of Spencer Kellog & Sons. Management transferred to Keystone Shipping Corp. in 1946. Sold in 1948 to Southeastern Tankers Inc., Wilmington, Delaware. Sold later that year to Southeastern Oil Inc., Jacksonville. Sold in 1950 to Petróleos Mexicanos, Mexico City and renamed Reynosa. She was scrapped at Minatitlán, Mexico in 1968.

== Henry L. Gantt ==
Henry L. Gantt was built by California Shipbuilding Corporation. Her keel was laid on 8 December 1943. She was launched on 31 December and delivered on 18 January 1944. Built for the WSA, she was operated under the management of American-Hawaiian Steamship Co. To the French Government in 1947 and renamed Gerardmer. Operated under the management of Compagnie Chargeurs Réunis. Laid up at Dunkirk, France in 1962, she was scrapped at Bruges, Belgium in December 1963.

== Henry L. Hoyt ==
Henry L. Hoyt was built by Oregon Shipbuilding Corporation. Her keel was laid on 14 June 1943. She was launched on 3 July and delivered on 13 July. She was scrapped at Panama City, Florida in October 1967.

== Henry L. Pittock ==
Henry L. Pittock was built by Oregon Shipbuilding Corporation. Her keel was laid on 5 June 1943. She was launched as Henry L. Pittock on 24 June and delivered as Askold on 2 July. To the Soviet Union under Lend-Lease. Renamed Dalryba in 1977. Scrapped in the Soviet Union in 1982.

== Henry Lomb ==
Henry Lomb was built by Bethlehem Fairfield Shipyard. Her keel was laid on 19 August 1943. She was launched on 13 September and delivered on 20 September. Built for the WSA, she was operated under the management of A. H. Bull & Co. Management transferred to Lykes Bros. Steamship Co. in 1946. Sold in 1951 to Western Navigation Corp., New York and renamed Western Farmer. Collided with the Norwegian tanker Bjorgholm 18 nautical miles (33 km) off Ramsgate on 20 August 1952 whilst on a voyage from the Hampton Roads to Bremen, West Germany. She broke in two, with the bow section sinking. The stern section was towed to Calais, France and beached. It was refloated on 9 June and towed to Dunkerque. It was scrapped at Burcht, Belgium in August 1955.

== Henry Meiggs ==
Henry Meiggs was built by Permanente Metals Corporation. Her keel was laid on 28 March 1943. She was launched on 17 April and delivered on 25 April. Laid up at Mobile post-war, she was scrapped at Panama City, Florida in February 1971.

== Henry Middleton ==
Henry Middleton was built by North Carolina Shipbuilding Company. Her keel was laid on 5 September 1942. She was launched on 25 October and delivered on 4 November. Laid up in the Hudson River post-war, she was scrapped at Kearny in November 1971.

== Henry Miller ==
Henry Miller was built by California Shipbuilding Corporation. Her keel was laid on 31 October 1943. She was launched on 27 November and delivered on 19 December. Built for the WSA, she was operated under the management of Moore-McCormack Steamship Co. Torpedoed and damaged off the coast of Morocco (35°51′N 6°24′W) by U-870 on 3 January 1945 whilst on a voyage from Livorno, Italy to the Hampton Roads. She put in to Gibraltar the next day and was declared a constructive total loss. Towed to Málaga, Spain on 30 August 1948. Subsequently scrapped.

== Henry M. Rice ==
Henry M. Rice was built by California Shipbuilding Corporation. Her keel was laid on 18 February 1943. She was launched on 17 March and delivered on 31 March. She was scrapped at Panama City in July 1963.

== Henry M. Robert ==
Henry M. Robert was built by Todd Houston Shipbuilding Corporation. Her keel was laid on 24 February 1944. She was launched on 4 April and delivered on 15 April. Built for the WSA, she was operated under the management of Dichmann, Wright & Pugh. Sold in 1946 to Atlantic Maritime Co., Panama and renamed Atlantic Wind. Operated under the management of Boyd, Weir & Sewell Inc. Management transferred to Livanos & Co. in 1948. Sold in 1950 to Compania Caretto de Navigation, Panama. Operated under the management of Maritime Brokers Inc. Management transferred to Economou & Co. in 1952. Renamed Wind in 1953. Sold in 1959 to Aspasia Shipping Corp. and renamed Galini. Reflagged to Greece and operated under the management of J. Livanos & Sons. Management transferred to Orizon Shipping Co. in 1962. She was scrapped at Kaohsiung in March 1968.

== Henry M. Robinson ==
Henry M. Robinson was built by California Shipbuilding Corporation. Her keel was laid on 15 July 1943. She was launched as Henry M. Robinson on 8 August and delivered as Samarovsk on 21 August. To the MoWT under Lend-Lease, operated under the management of Lamport & Holt Line. Returned to the United States Maritime Commission (USMC) in 1947 and laid up in the James River. She was scrapped at Panama City, Florida in December 1961.

== Henry M. Stanley ==
Henry M. Stanley was built by California Shipbuilding Corporation. Her keel was laid on 23 August 1943. She was launched as Henry M. Stanley on 14 September and delivered as Samneva on 27 September. To the MoWT under Lend-Lease. She was operated under the management of A. Holt & Co. Torpedoed and damaged in the English Channel (50°14′N 0°47′W) by U-309 on 24 July 1944 and was beached at Southampton, United Kingdom, where she broke in two. The stern section was scrapped at Briton Ferry, United Kingdom in June 1948. The bow section was scrapped at Netley.

== Henry M. Stephens ==
Henry M. Stephens was built by Permanente Metals Corporation. Her keel was laid on 12 February 1944. She was launched on 2 March and delivered on 11 March. Built for the WSA, she was operated under the management of Alaska Transportation Co. Management transferred to Pacific Far East Line in 1947. Sold in 1951 to States Cargo Carriers Corp. and renamed Seafaith. Operated under the management of Orion Shipping & Trading Co. Sold in 1953 to Seafaith Steamship Co., Wilmington, Delaware, then sold later that year to Suwannee Steamship Co., Jacksonville. Sold in 1954 to Volusia Steamship Co. Reflagged to Liberia. Operated under the joint management of International Trust Co. of Liberia and Suwannee Steamship Co. Lengthened by Sasebo Ship Industry Ltd., Sasebo in 1956. Now 511 feet 6 inches (155.91 m) long, 8,453 GRT, 12,390 DWT. Sold in 1957 to San Rafael Compania Navigation, Panama and renamed Andros Fairplay. Remaining under the Liberian flag and operated under the management of Orion Shipping & Trading Co. Sold in 1960 to Fleet Shipping Corp. and renamed Messiniakos. Reflagged to Greece, remaining under the same management. Sold in 1962 to Atlantis Shipping Corp., New York and renamed Polyktor, remaining under the Greek Flag. Sold in 1963 to Elpis Compania Navigation, Panama and renamed Capetan Costis I. Remaining under the Greek flag and operated under the management of Constellation Maritime Agencies. Management transferred to Alpro Maritime Agencies in 1967. She was scrapped at Gandia in April 1967.

== Henry M. Teller ==
Henry M. Teller was built by Permanente Metals Corporation. Her keel was laid on 15 August 1943. She was launched as Henry M. Teller on 6 September and delivered as Chung Shan on 14 September. To China under Lend-Lease. Returned to the USMC in 1947 and renamed Henry M. Teller. Operated under the management of Sudden & Christensen. Laid up in the James River in 1949. To United States Department of Commerce in 1951. Operated under the management of Pope & Talbot Inc. Laid up in the James River in 1952. She was scrapped at Bilbao in September 1971.

== Henry R. Schoolcraft ==
Henry R. Schoolcraft was built by Permanente Metals Corporation. Her keel was laid on 11 December 1943. She was launched on 30 December and delivered on 4 February 1944. Built for the WSA, she was operated under the management of Seas Shipping Co. Sold in 1947 to Fratellia Piaggio di Marco, Genoa and renamed San Marco Quarto. Sold on 1950 to Compania di Navigazione Stellamaris, Genoa and renamed San Marco IV. Sold in 1956 to Stellamaris Società per Azioni, Naples and renamed Settemari. Sold in 1961 to Dimitrio Panayotis & Ioanni T. Angelopoulos, Athens and renamed Christitsa. Collided with Citta di Beirut off Hydra Island, Greece on 18 April 1964 whilst on a voyage from Algiers, Algeria to Eleusis, Greece. Beached at Kynosoura in a severely damaged condition. She was refloated and towed to Eleusis Bay. She was scrapped at Castellón de la Plana, Spain in 1968.

== Henry S. Foote ==
Henry S. Foote was built by Delta Shipbuilding Company. Her keel was laid on 18 March 1943. She was launched on 24 April and delivered on 12 May. She was scrapped at Nagasaki, Japan in October 1960.

== Henry S. Lane ==
Henry S. Lane was built by Oregon Shipbuilding Company. Her keel was laid on 27 April 1943. She was launched on 16 May and delivered on 24 May. She was scrapped at New Orleans, Louisiana in June 1964.

== Henry S. Sanford ==
Henry S. Sanford was built by St. Johns River Shipbuilding Company. Her keel was laid on 22 December 1943. She was launched on 19 February 1944 and delivered on 4 March. Laid up in Puget Sound post-war, she was scrapped at Tacoma in September 1970.

== Henry St. G. Tucker ==
Henry St. G. Tucker was built by Bethlehem Fairfield Shipyard. Her keel was laid on 25 February 1942. She was launched on 14 May and delivered on 8 June. She was scrapped at New Orleans in August 1966.

== Henry T. Rainey ==
Henry T. Rainey was built by Oregon Shipbuilding Corporation. Her keel was laid on 22 October 1943. She was launched on 10 November and delivered on 20 November. Laid up in the James River post-war, she was scrapped at Brownsville in 1973.

== Henry T. Scott ==
Henry T. Scott was built by Permanente Metals Corporation. Her keel was laid on 12 May 1944. She was launched on 2 June and delivered on 10 June. She was scrapped at Panama City, Florida in November 1965.

== Henry V. Alvarado ==
Henry V. Alvarado was built by Permanente Metals Corporation. Her keel was laid on 4 July 1943. She was launched on 26 July and delivered on 7 August. Built for the WSA, she was operated under the management of United Fruit Company. Sold in 1947 to Società Comerciale di Navigazione, Genoa and renamed Italmare. FIAT diesel engine fitted at Genoa in 1950. Sold in 1966 to Lloyd's Africa Ltd and renamed Eastport. Reflagged to Liberia and operated under the management of Transamerican Steamship Corp. She was scrapped at Santander in June 1971.

== Henry Van Dyke ==
Henry Van Dyke was built by Bethlehem Fairfield Shipyard. Her keel was laid on 15 July 1943. She was launched as Henry Van Dyke on 13 August and delivered as Samhain on 23 August. To the MoWT under Lend-Lease. Operated under the management of Ellerman & Bucknall Steamship Co. Sold in 1947 to Ellerman Lines Ltd. and renamed City of Portsmouth, remaining under her previous management. Collided with the quayside at Bombay on 26 January 1958 and was damaged. Sold in 1959 to Demetrios P. Margaronis, Athens and renamed Efcharis. Placed under the management of Angelos Ltd. in 1960. Management transferred to Victoria Steamship Co. in 1965. Laid up at Piraeus in 1970, she was scrapped at Kynosoura, or in Turkey in 1971.

== Henry Villard ==
Henry Villard was built by Oregon Shipbuilding Corporation. Her keel was laid on 14 August 1942. She was launched on 14 September and delivered on 25 September. Built for the WSA, she was operated under the management of Coastwise Line. Management transferred to American President Lines in 1946, then Pope & Talbot Inc. later that year. Sold in 1951 to American Pacific Steamship Co., San Francisco and renamed Ampac Oregon. Sold in 1951 to Arapahoe Co. Inc. and renamed Arapahoe. Operated under the management of Transoceanic Marine Inc. Sold in 1956 to Pacifica SA, Panama and renamed Ketty D. Reflagged to Liberia and operated under the management of Jason Shipping & Trading Co. Renamed Athenoula T. in 1960. Placed under the management of Tsakalotos Navigation Corp. in 1961. Sold in 1964 to Warwick Corp. Remaining under the same flag and management. Ran aground at Hoek van Holland, Netherlands on 24 December 1964 whilst on a voyage from New Orleans to Antwerp. Refloated on 30 December. Declared a constructive total loss, she was scrapped at Hamburg in April 1965.

== Henry Ward Becher ==
Henry Ward Becher was built by California Shipbuilding Corporation. Her keel was laid on 4 August 1942. She was launched on 11 September and delivered on 26 September. She was scrapped at Kearny in February 1969.

== Henry Watterson ==
Henry Watterson was built by St. Johns River Shipbuilding Company. Her keel was laid on 19 April 1943. She was launched on 21 July and delivered on 18 August. Built for the WSA, she was operated under the management of American Export Lines. To the USMC in 1946. Sold in August 1947 to Lundegaard & Sønner, Farsund, Norway and renamed Spurt. Sold in 1950 to Skips A/S Lundegaard, Farsund. Placed under the management of her previous owner. Sold in 1961 to Compania Maritima Angelikane S. A., Beirut and renamed Spartan. She ran aground in Pasa Buenavista, Cuba on 13 December 1961 whilst on a voyage from Gdańsk, Poland to Cienfuegos, Cuba. Refloated on 29 May 1962 and towed in to Havana. Declared a constructive total loss, reported consequently scrapped.

== Henry W. Corbett ==
Henry W. Corbett (#1616) was launched on March 29, 1943, by Mrs. Henry Ladd Corbett. The keel had been laid only twenty days earlier on March 9, 1943. This ship was afterwards lent to the Russian war effort. A portrait of Stalin was found hanging alongside the one of H. W. Corbett in a Russian port when a younger relation went on board. The SS Henry W. Corbett was never returned and was later renamed by the Russians the Alexander Nevsky after their thirteenth century warrior prince and saint. Relegated to a storage ship at Vladivostok in 1978.

== Henry Wells ==
Henry Wells was built by Permanente Metals Corporation. Her keel was laid on 22 August 1943. She was launched on 16 September and delivered on 27 September. Built for the WSA, she was operated under the management of Grace Line. To USMC in 1946. Sold in July 1947 to Rederi A/S Mascot, Olso and renamed Britta. Operated under the management of Arthur H. Mathiesen. Sold in 1951 to Societa Navigaiton Interamericana, Panama and renamed Challenger. Sold in 1956 to Orense Compania Navigation, Puerto Limón, Honduras and renamed Planet. Reflagged to Liberia in 1958. She was scrapped at Onomichi in October 1966.

== Henry W. Grady ==
Henry W. Grady was built by J. A. Jones Construction Company, Brunswick. Her keel was laid on 31 July 1943. She was launched on 22 October and delivered on 30 October. Built for the WSA, she was operated under the management of Wilmore Steamship Co. Laid up at Beaumont post-war, she was scrapped at Brownsville in July 1971.

== Henry White ==
Henry White was built by Permanente Metals Corporation. Her keel was laid on 5 April 1944. She was launched on 23 April and delivered on 30 April. Built for the WSA, she was operated under the management of De La Rama Steamship Co. Transferred to the United States War Department in 1946. Sold in 1947 to Compania Maritima Samsoc, Panama and renamed Despina. Operated under the management of Fred Hunter Ltd. Sold in 1953 to Compania Armadora San Francisco and renamed Elga. Operated under the management of T. J. Verrando & Co. Management transferred to Salvatores & Racab in 1956, then Enrico Verani-Masin in 1961, T. J. Verrando Shipping Corp. in 1962, and Transamerican Steamship Corp. in 1964. She was scrapped at Kaohsiung in August 1967.

== Henry Wilson ==
Henry Wilson was built by New England Shipbuilding Corporation. Her keel was laid on 8 March 1943. She was launched on 3 May and delivered on 26 May. She collided with Samuel F. B. Morse on 25 July 1943 whilst on a voyage from Liverpool, United Kingdom to New York. She was scrapped at Wilmington, North Carolina in May 1962.

== Henry W. Longfellow ==
Henry W. Longfellow was built by Oregon Shipbuilding Corporation. Her keel was laid on 22 December 1941. She was launched on 5 March 1942 and delivered on 18 April. She was scrapped at Chickasaw, Alabama in May 1965.

== Henry Wynkoop ==
Henry Wynkoop was built by Delta Shipbuilding Corporation. Her keel was laid on 10 October 1942. She was launched on 26 November and delivered on 11 December. Built for the WSA, she was operated under the management of United Fruit Company. A member of Convoy HX 228, she struck a submerged object on 11 March 1943, after which oil was observed floating on the surface. Presumed that she hit and sank a U-boat (both U-432 and U-444 were lost on this day, depth charged by convoy escorts). She was reported to have been scrapped at Baltimore in 1958.

== Herbert D. Croly ==
Herbert D. Croly was built by Todd Houston Shipbuilding Corporation. Her keel was laid on 11 August 1944. She was launched on 20 September and delivered on 30 September. Laid up in Puget Sound post-war, she was scrapped at Tacoma in July 1970.

== Herman Melville ==
Herman Melville was built by New England Shipbuilding Corporation. Her keel was laid on 7 March 1942. She was launched on 6 October and delivered on 20 October. She was scrapped at Jersey City, New Jersey in April 1960.

== Herrin Seam ==
Herrin Seam was a collier built by Delta Shipbuilding Corporation. Her keel was laid on 1 April 1945. She was launched on 25 April and delivered on 25 June. Built for the WSA, she was operated under the management of Sprague Steamship Co. Sold in 1946 to M. & J. Tracy Inc., New York and renamed Thomas Tracy. Sold in 1962 to Marine Corp. and renamed Marine Leader. Operated under the management of Marine Transport Lines. Sold later that year to Canterbury Shipping Corp. and renamed Canterbury Leader, remaining under the same managers. Sold in 1966 to Hudson Waterways Corp. and placed under the management of Transeastern Associates. She was scrapped at Kaohsiung in April 1967.

== Heywood Brown ==
Heywood Broun was built by Bethlehem Fairfield Shipyard. Her keel was laid on 12 August 1943. She was launched on 6 September and delivered on 12 September. Built for the WSA, she was operated under the management of Boland & Cornelius. Laid up at Wilmington, North Carolina in 1948. Sold in 1951 to Victory Carriers Inc., New York. Sold in 1957 to Alexander S. Onassis Corp. Reflagged to Liberia and operated under the management of her previous owner. Sold in 1961 to Edina Transportation Co. and renamed Cavalier. Operated under the management of Olympic Maritime SA. She was scrapped at Hong Kong in August 1969.

== H. G. Blasdel ==
H. G. Blasdel was built by Permanente Metals Corporation. Her keel was laid on 8 July 1943. She was launched on 30 July and delivered on 10 August. Built for the WSA, she was operated under the management of American President Lines. Torpedoed and damaged in the English Channel off the Normandy coast by German submarine U-984 on 29 June 1944. Towed to Southampton and beached. She broke in two. Later refloated and towed to Briton Ferry for scrapping, arriving on 13 November. She was scrapped in 1947.

== H. H. Raymond ==
H. H. Raymond was built by J. A. Jones Construction Company, Panama City, Florida. Her keel was laid on 13 April 1944. She was launched on 24 May and delivered on 14 June. Laid up in the Hudson River post-war, she was scrapped at Kearny, New Jersey in April 1971.

== Hilary A. Herbert ==
Hilary A. Herbert was a limited troop carrier built by North Carolina Shipbuilding Company. Her keel was laid on 30 May 1943. She was launched on 27 June and delivered on 5 July. Built for the WSA, she was operated under the management of Cosmopolitan Shipping Co. She ran aground in the Scheldt on 6 April 1947 whilst on a voyage from the Hampton Roads to Antwerp. Refloated on 13 April and towed in to Antwerp, declared a constructive total loss. Sold in 1948 to Compania Navigation Parita, Panama and renamed Parita III. Operated under the management of C. Strubin Ltd. Sold in 1949 to Corredor Compania Navigation and renamed Katie. Operated under the management of Kyras & Lemos. Management transferred to C. M. Lemos & Co. in 1956. Sold in 1960 to Spartan Shipping Co., Panama and renamed Doxa. Reflagged to Greece and operated under the management of Triton Shipping Inc. She was scrapped at Hamburg in October 1967.

== Hinton R. Helper ==
Hinton R. Helper was built by California Shipbuilding Corporation. Her keel was laid on 12 June 1942. She was launched on 24 July and delivered on 13 August. She was scrapped at Baltimore in March 1961.

== Hiram Bingham ==
Hiram Bingham was built by Permanente Metals Corporation. Her keel was laid on 22 July 1943. She was launched on 13 August and delivered on 25 August. Built for the WSA, she was operated under the management of Grace Line Inc. Sold in 1947 to Società di Navigazione Marittima Trinacria, Messina, Sicily, Italy and renamed Volcano. Sold in 1956 to L'Italica di Navigazione, Genoa. Sold in 1958 to Insulaire Compania Sicula di Armamento, Palermo, Sicily. Sold in 1965 to Agiogalusena Steamship Inc. and renamed Agiogalusena. Reflagged to Liberia and operated under the management of Apollo Shipping Inc. She was scrapped at Split in April 1969.

== Hiram S. Maxim ==
Hiram S. Maxim was built by Permanente Metals Corporation. Her keel was laid on 28 January 1943. She was launched on 24 February and delivered on 6 March. Built for the WSA, she was operated under the management of Pacific Far East Lines. Bombed and damaged off Algeria on 4 October 1943 whilst on a voyage from the Hampton Roads to the Persian Gulf. She was towed in to Algiers. Subsequently repaired. She was scrapped at Portland, Oregon in August 1965.

== Hobart Baker ==
Hobart Baker was built by Permanente Metals Corporation. Her keel was laid on 16 April 1943. She was launched on 12 April and delivered on 24 April. Built for the WSA, she was operated under the management of General Steamship Co. Sunk by Japanese aircraft off Mindoro, Philippines on 28 December 1944.

== Hoke Smith ==
Hoke Smith was built by Southeastern Shipbuilding Corporation. Her keel was laid on 21 July 1946. She was launched on 16 September and delivered on 27 September. Built for the WSA, she was operated under the management of American Export Lines. Sold in 1947 to Rederiet Ocean A/S, Denmark and renamed Thora Dan. Operated under the management of J. Lauritzen. Sold in 1948 to Compania de Navigation Aeolus SA., Panama and renamed Spalmatori. Operated under the management of Lemos & Pateras. Sold in 1960 to Compania de Vapores Realma SA. and renamed Mastro-Stelios II. Reflagged to Greece and operated under the management of Vlassooulos. Sold in 1961 to Ulysses Shipping Enterprises, Panama, remaining under the same flag and managers. Sold in 1965 to First Freighters Ltd., Johannesburg, South Africa and renamed Wendy H. She was scrapped at Valencia, Spain in November 1967.

== Holland Thompson ==
Holland Thompson was built by Bethlehem Fairfield Shipyard. Her keel was laid on 22 July 1943. Launched as Holland Thompson on 18 August, she was delivered as Samite on 26 August. To the MoWT under Lend-Lease, she was operated under the management of A. Holt & Co. Returned to USMC in 1947 and laid up at Mobile. She was scrapped at Panama City, Florida in March 1963.

== Homer Lea ==
Homer Lea was built by Permanente Metals Corporation. Her keel was laid on 21 March 1943. She was launched on 17 April and delivered on 30 April. She was scrapped at Seattle in December 1958.

== Hooper Island ==
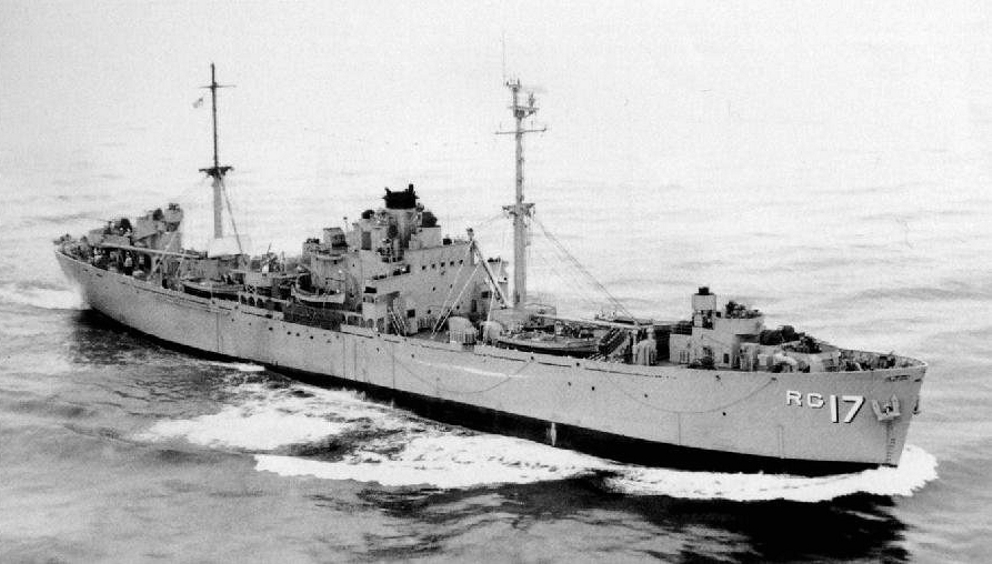
USS Hooper Island

Hooper Island was built by Bethlehem Fairfield Shipyard. Her keel was laid on 16 September 1944. She was launched as Bert McDowell on 18 October and delivered to the United States Navy as Hooper Island on 30 October. An engine repair ship, she was laid up at Alameda, California in January 1948. Recommissioned in December 1952. Laid up at San Diego, California in July 1959. Moved to Suisun Bay in 1960. Scrapped at Portland, Oregon in November 1970.

== Horace Binney ==
Horace Binney was built by Bethlehem Fairfield Shipyard. Her keel was laid on 28 June 1942. She was launched on 19 August and delivered on 29 August. Built for the WSA, she was operated under the management of American Export Lines. She struck a mine in the North Sea 36 nautical miles (67 km) off Vlissingen, Netherlands on 8 May 1945 and was beached at Deal. She broke in two. Subsequently, laid up in the River Blackwater. She was scrapped at Antwerp in May 1948.

== Horace Bushnell ==
Horace Bushnell was built by Bethlehem Fairfield Shipyard. Her keel was laid on 5 September 1943. She was launched on 28 September and delivered on 5 October. Built for the WSA, she was operated under the management of R. A. Nicol & Co. Torpedoed and damaged 25 nautical miles (46 km) off the Kilden Lighthouse, Soviet Union (69°23′N 35°17′E) by U-995 on 20 March 1945 whilst on a voyage from New York to Murmansk, Soviet Union. Taken in tow by a Royal Navy warship, but the tow was abandoned. Taken in tow by two Soviet tugs and beached at Toroborski. Subsequently refloated and towed in to Murmansk. Rebuilt into a fish carrier between 1948 and 1955. New compound 4-cylinder engine fitted. Renamed Pamyati Kirova. Now 8,491 GRT. She was reported to have been scrapped in the Soviet Union in 1978.

== Horace Gray ==
Horace Gray was built by Bethlehem Fairfield Shipyard. Her keel was laid on 14 December 1942. She was launched on 25 January 1943 and delivered on 11 February. Built for the WSA, she was operated under the management of American Export Lines. Torpedoed and damaged in the Kola Inlet (69°12′N 33°43′E) by U-711 on 14 February 1945 whilst on a voyage from Molotovsk to Murmansk. Abandoned by her crew, she was taken in tow by a Soviet tug and beached in Tyuva Bay. She was a total loss.

== Horace Greely ==
Horace Greely was built by California Shipbuilding Corporation. Her keel was laid on 31 July 1942. She was launched on 9 September and delivered on 24 September. To the United States Navy in 1966. Scuttled in the Atlantic Ocean with a cargo of obsolete ammunition on 28 July 1966.

== Horace H. Harvey ==
Horace H. Harvey was a tanker built by Delta Shipbuilding Company. Her keel was laid on 26 September 1943. She was launched on 10 November and delivered on 24 December. Built for the WSA, she was operated under the management of American Petroleum Transport Corp. Sold in 1948 to East Harbor Trading Corp., New York and renamed Groton Trails. Converted to a cargo ship at Baltimore in 1949. Now 7,202 GRT. Sold in 1957 to Peninsular Navigation Corp and renamed Valley Forge. She ran aground off Mapor Island, 65 nautical miles (120 km) south east of Singapore on 30 December 1959 whilst on a voyage from Portland, Oregon to Madras, India. She later broke in two and sank.

== Horace H. Lurton ==
Horace H. Lurton was built by J. A. Jones Construction Company, Brunswick. Her keel was laid on 12 July 1943. She was launched on 7 October and delivered on 19 October. Built for the WSA, she was operated under the management of Cosmopolitan Shipping Co. To the French Government in 1946 and renamed Royan. Operated under the management of Delmas-Vieljeux. Sold to West German shipbreakers in 1967, then resold. Sold in 1968 to Harma Shipping Co., Nicosia, Cyprus. Renamed Roy in March 1968 for voyage to shipbreakers. She was scrapped at Shanghai in June 1968.

== Horace Mann ==
Horace Mann was built by California Shipbuilding Company. Her keel was laid on 12 July 1942. She was launched on 19 August and delivered on 8 September. Built for the WSA, she was operated under the management of Isthmian Steamship Co. Sold in 1947 to Petros N. Nomikos, Piraeus and renamed Petros Nomikos. Sold in 1950 to Marcos P. Nomikos, Piraeus. Sold in 1959 to Olisman Compania Navigation, Panama and renamed Areti. Reflagged to Lebanon and operated under the management of Purvis Shipping Co. Sold in 1967 to Areti Shipping Co. Reflagged to Cyprus and operated under the management of Franco Shipping Co. She was scrapped at Shanghai in June 1970.

== Horace See ==
Horace See was a tanker built by California Shipbuilding Company. She was delivered in October 1943. Built for the WSA, she was operated under the management of Pacific Tankers Corp. Sold in 1948 to Coastwise Bulk Carriers Inc. Sold in 1950 to United Waterways Corp and renamed Seathrill. Operated under the management of Orion Shipping & Trading Co. Sold in 1952 to Pinogana Compania Navigation, Panama and renamed Stenigs. Converted to a cargo ship at Greenock, United Kingdom in 1954. Lengthened at Maizuru, United Kingdom in 1956. Now 511 feet 6 inches (155.91 m) long and 8,518 GRT. Reflagged to Liberia. Renamed Andros Seaman in 1957. Sold in 1960 to Produce Shipping Corp. and renamed Kifissos. Reflagged to Greece. Sold in 1962 to Hercules Shipping Corp. and renamed Niritos. Operated under the management of Dracoulis Ltd. Sold later that year to Produce Shipping Corp. and renamed Cavouri. Operated under the management of Capeside Steamship Co., and Orion Shipping & Trading Co. Sold in 1964 to Lagerine Shipping Corp. and renamed Maria T. Reflagged to Liberia and operated under the management of Longbeach Marine Agencies. Laid up at Piraeus in 1971. She was scrapped at Darica, Turkey in April 1972.

== Horace V. White ==
Horace V. White was built by Oregon Shipbuilding Corporation. Her keel was laid on 15 October 1943. She was launched on 3 November and delivered on 12 November. She was scrapped at Oakland, California in March 1961.

== Horace Wells ==
Horace Wells was built by Permanente Metals Corporation. Her keel was laid on 17 July 1943. She was launched on 12 August and delivered on 22 August. Built for the WSA, she was operated under the management of Isthmian Steamship Co. Transferred to USMC in 1946. Sold in 1947 to J. H. Wessels Kullforretning A/S, Drammen, Norway and renamed Janna. Operated under the management of Pehrson & Wessel. To the Polish Government in December 1958 and renamed Chorzow. Operated by Polska Żegluga Morska. Converted to a storeship at Gdańsk in the fourth quarter of 1968 and renamed MP-PZZ-11. Renamed MP-ZOZIE-13 in 1972. Sold in 1980 to Eckhardt Marine Ltd., Hamburg for scrapping. She was resold to Spanish shipbreakers and scrapped in Santander.

== Horace Williams ==
Horace Williams was built by North Carolina Shipbuilding Company. Her keel was laid on 12 March 1943. She was launched on 12 April and delivered on 19 April. Built for the WSA, she was operated under the management of Prudential Steamship Corp. To the Dutch Government in 1947 and renamed Erasmus. Renamed Leemsterkerk later that year and placed under the management of Vereenigde Nederlandsche Scheepvaart Maatschappij, Den Haag. Sold to her managers in 1950. Trapped in the Suez Canal in 1956 during the Suez Crisis. Sold in 1962 to Troditis Compania Navigation and renamed Kypros. Reflagged to Lebanon and operated under the management of Troodos Shipping & Tradingg Co. Renamed Stalo in 1964. Renamed Savvas in 1970 and reflagged to Cyprus. She was scrapped at Castellón de la Plana in May 1971.

== Horatio Allen ==
Horatio Allen was built by California Shipbuilding Corporation. Her keel was laid on 15 January 1944. She was launched on 10 February and delivered on 26 February. Built for the WSA, she was operated under the management of Burns Steamship Co. Sold in 1947 to Central Gulf Corp., Dover, Delaware and renamed Green Wave. Sold in 1950 to Greenwave Steamship Corp. Operated under the management of Orion Shipping & Trading Co. Renamed Seagate in 1952. Sold in 1954 to Volusia Steamship Co. Reflagged to Liberia and operated under the joint management of International Trust Co. of Liberia and Suwannee Steamship Co. Sold in 1956 to San Rafael Compania Navigation, Panama. Remaining under the Liberian flag and operated under the management of Orion Shipping & Trading Co. Lengthened in Japan that year. Now 511 feet 6 inches (155.91 m) long and 8,384 GRT. Ran aground on the Sonora Reef, off Aberdeen, Washington on 6 September 1956 whilst on a voyage from Muroran, Japan to Vancouver She was washed off the reef on 9 September and ran aground in the Quinault River. She broke in two on 21 September and was declared a total loss. She was scrapped at Point Greenville, Washington in 1958.

== Houston Volunteers ==
Houston Volunteers was built by Todd Houston Shipbuilding Corporation. Her keel was laid on 3 August 1942. She was launched on 6 October and delivered on 28 October. She was scrapped at Oakland in 1966.

== Howard A. Kelly ==
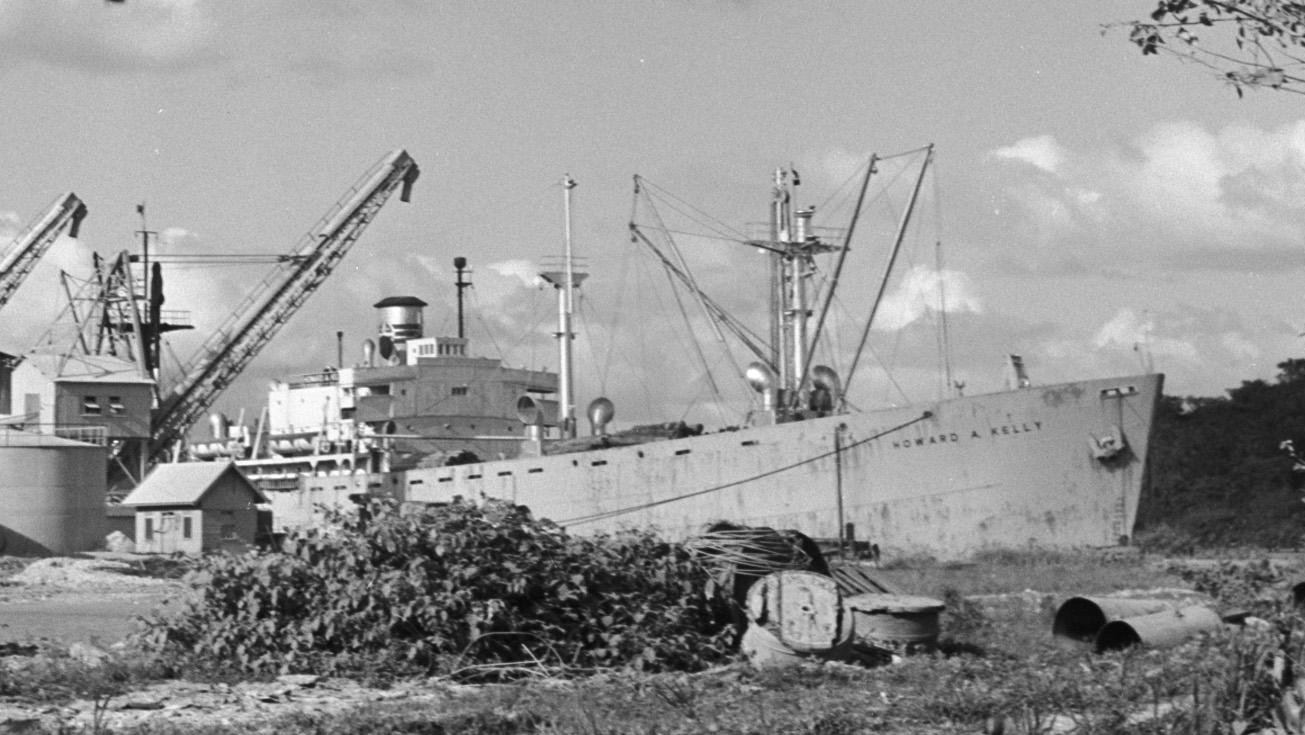
Howard A. Kelly

Howard A. Kelly a limited troop carrier was built by Bethlehem Fairfield Shipyard. Her keel was laid on 8 February 1943. She was launched on 18 March and delivered on 29 March. Built for the WSA, she was operated under the management of A. L. Burbank & Co. Sold in 1949 to Actium Shipping Corp., New York and renamed Tainaron. Sold in 1954 to Ronda Compania Maritima, Panama and renamed Aktion. Reflagged to Liberian and operated under the management of Admanthos Ship Operating Co. Renamed Olympos in 1960 and reflagged to Greece. Lengthened at Maizuru in 1962. Now 511 feet 6 inches (155.91 m) long and 8,593 GRT. Renamed Olympian in 1966 and reflagged to Liberia. Sold in 1968 to Amicus Steamship Co. and renamed Binky. Operated under the management of "C" Ventures Inc. She was scrapped at Kaohsiung in November 1969.

== Howard E. Coffin ==
Howard E. Coffin was built by J. A. Jones Construction Company, Brunswick. Her keel was laid on 30 November 1943. She was launched on 21 January 1944 and delivered on 31 January. Built for the WSA, she was operated under the management of South Atlantic Steamship Line. Sold in 1947 to Villain & Fassio, Genoa and renamed Patricia Fassio. She was scrapped at Trieste in October 1962.

== Howard Gray ==
Howard Gray was built by J. A. Jones Construction Company, Panama City. Her keel was laid on 6 April 1944. She was launched on 18 May and delivered on 7 June. Built for the WSA, she was operated under the management of Black Diamond Steamship Company. Sold in 1947 to Marino Querci, Genoa and renamed Italico. Sold in 1950 to L'Italica di Navigazione, Genoa. Sold in 1959 to San Antonio Inc. and renamed Azahar. Reflagged to Panama and operated under the management of Runciman & Co. Reflagged to Lebanon in 1961. Management transferred to Compania Armatoriale Italiana in 1962. She was scrapped at Shanghai in 1969.

== Howard L. Gibson ==
Howard L. Gibson was built by Todd Houston Shipbuilding Corporation. Her keel was laid on 18 July 1944. She was launched on 25 August and delivered on 6 September. Built for the WSA, she was operated under the management of United States Navigation Co. Collided with the British tanker Geo. W. McKnight in the Atlantic Ocean 250 nautical miles (460 km) north west of Madeira (34°07′N 21°24′W) on 14 October 1944 whilst on a voyage from Galveston, Texas to Karachi, India. Set afire, she was abandoned by her crew. She was reboarded and the fire was extinguished the next day. Towed to Casablanca, Morocco, and then to New York. Declared a constructive total loss, she was scrapped at Philadelphia in October 1945.

== Howard Stansbury ==
Howard Stansbury was built by California Shipbuilding Corporation. Her keel was laid on 31 December 1942. She was launched on 30 January 1943 and delivered on 15 February. She was scrapped at Everett in August 1961.

== Howard T. Ricketts ==
Howard T. Ricketts was built by California Shipbuilding Corporation. Her keel was laid on 21 June 1943. She was launched on 17 July and delivered on 301 July. Built for the WSA, she was operated under the management of Luckenbach Steamship Corp. Laid up in 1949. Sold in 1951 to American Pacific Steamship Corp., San Pedro, California and renamed Ampac Idaho. Sold in 1956 to Modoc Corp. and renamed Modoc. Reflagged to Liberia and operated under the management of Transoceanic Marine Corp. Sold later that year to World Legion Corp. and renamed World Legion. Remained under the same flag and managers. Sold in 1961 to Nestor Shipping Co. Operated under the management of Niarchos Ltd. Sold in 1963 to Alexandra Navigation Corp. and renamed Eleanor. Operated under the management of Eddie Steamship Corp. Renamed Chee Lee in 1964, then reverted to Eleanor later that year. She was scrapped at Kaohsiung in 1968.

== Howell Cobb ==
Howell Cobb was built by Permanente Metals Corporation. Her keel was laid on 28 February 1943. She was launched on 30 March and delivered on 12 April. She was sunk as a breakwater and dock at Cook Inlet, Alaska in 1966.

== Howell E. Jackson ==
Howell E. Jackson was built by J. A. Jones Construction Company, Brunswick. Her keel was laid on 22 May 1943. She was launched on 6 September and delivered on 25 September. Built for the WSA, she was operated under the management of Marine Transport. She was scrapped at Bordentown, New Jersey in September 1962.

== Hubert Howe Bancroft ==
Hubert Howe Bancroft was built by California Shipbuilding Corporation. Her keel was laid on 13 October 1943. She was launched on 11 November and delivered on 30 November. Built for the WSA, she was operated under the management of Isthmian Steamship Co. Management transferred to States Marine Corp. in 1946. Sold in 1947 to Global Transport Ltd., Panama and renamed Global Spinner. Sold in 1948 to Torvald Klaveness Rederi S/A, Oslo and renamed Vinje Sold in 1949 to Skibs A/S Akersviken, Oslo and renamed Vinstra. Operated under the management of Gørrinsen & Klaveness A/S. Sold in 1953 to Michalinos Maritime & Corn Co. Ltd., Piraeus and renamed Nicolaos Michalinos III. Sold in 1963 to L. C. Michalinos & S. Ziffos, Piraeus. She was scrapped at Whampoa Dock in May 1967.

== Hugh J. Kirkpatrick ==
Hugh J. Kirkpartrick was built by St. Johns River Shipbuilding Company. Her keel was laid on 21 April 1944. She was launched on 31 May and delivered on 22 June. Built for the WSA, she was operated under the management of States Marine Corp., New York. Sold to her managers in 1946 and renamed Hoosier State. Sold in 1955 to Transamerican Union Transport Inc. and renamed Transamerican. Operated under the management of Transamerican Steamship Corp. Sold in 1963 to Mid-America Steamship Corp and renamed A. & J. Mid-America. Operated under the management of Pacific Seafarers Inc. Driven ashore in a typhoon at Hong Kong on 5 September 1964, later refloated. Sold in 1965 to Hope Navigation Co. and renamed Grand Hope. Reflagged to Liberia and operated under the management of Sea King Corp. Sold in 1967 to Union Shipping Co. and renamed Union Tiger. Reflagged to South Korea and operated under the management of Livanos Ltd. Sold in 1968 to Hapdong Shipping Co. She was scrapped at Inchon, South Korea in April 1969.

== Hugh L. Kerwin ==
Hugh L. Kerwin was built by Bethlehem Fairfield Shipyard. Her keel was laid on 15 November 1943. She was launched as Hugh L. Kerwin on 7 December and delivered as Samyale on 17 December. To the MoWT under Lend-Lease. Operated under the management of Booth Steamship Co. Sold in 1947 to Elder Dempster Lines Ltd., Liverpool and renamed Zungon. Sold in 1958 to Society Pacifica Maritima, Panama and renamed Aegina. Reflagged to Liberia and operated under the management of Goulandris Ltd. Sold in 1959 to August Shipping Corp. Operated under the management of Suwannee Steamship Corp. Sold in 1966 to Marancho Compania Navigation, Panama and renamed Irini. Reflagged to Greece and operated under the management of Carapanayoti & Co. Collided with the Liberian tanker Russell H. Green 10 nautical miles (19 km) north of Cape Spartel, Morocco on 10 June 1967 whilst on a voyage from Gdynia, Poland to a Mediterranean port. She put in to Cadiz in a severely damaged condition. She was towed to Valencia on 6 December. Subsequently scrapped.

== Hugh McCulloch ==
Hugh McCulloch was built by Permanente Metals Corporation. Her keel was laid on 12 March 1943. She was launched on 5 April and delivered on 13 April. She was scrapped at Baltimore in March 1962.

== Hugh M. Smith ==
Hugh M. Smith was built by Bethlehem Fairfield Shipyard. Her keel was laid on 5 November 1943. She was launched on 26 November and delivered on 6 December. She was scrapped at Portland, Oregon in November 1969.

== Hugh S. Legare ==
Hugh S. Legare was built by California Shipbuilding Corporation. Her keel was laid on 18 November 1942. She was launched on 22 December and delivered on 6 January 1943. She was scrapped at Baltimore in March 1959.

== Hugh Williamson ==
Hugh Williamson was built by North Carolina Shipbuilding Company. Her keel was laid on 11 May 1942. She was launched on 7 July and delivered on 24 July. Ran aground on a reef at Pernambuco, Brazil on 18 June 1946 whilst on a voyage from Mobile to Buenos Aires, Argentina. Later refloated and completed her voyage, then sailed to Santos, Brazil and was laid up. She was scrapped at Baltimore in June 1948.

== Hugh Young ==
Hugh Young was built by Todd Houston Shipbuilding Corporation. Her keel was laid on 7 October 1943. She was launched on 18 November and delivered on 27 November. To United States Navy as Zaurak. Converted for naval use at Todd-Johnson Drydocks, New Orleans. Returned to WSA in March 1946 and renamed Hugh Young. Laid up in Suisun Bay. She was scrapped at Oakland in June 1963.

== Hutchinson I. Cone ==
Hutchinson I. Cone was built by North Carolina Shipbuilding Company. Her keel was laid on 31 May 1943. She was launched on 30 June and delivered on 7 July. She was scrapped at Mobile in May 1962.

== H. Weir Cook ==
H. Weir Cook was built by Permanente Metals Corporation. Her keel was laid on 25 February 1944. She was launched on 13 March and delivered on 23 March. She was scrapped at Portland, Oregon in March 1968.

== Hydra ==
Hydra was built by Delta Shipbuilding Corporation. Her keel was laid on 12 December 1944. She was launched as John C. Preston on 23 January 1945 and delivered as Hydra on 9 February. To the Greek Government under Lend-Lease. Sold in 1946 to C. N. Michalos, Piraeus and renamed Costas Michalos. She ran aground on the Banc les Quenocs, in the English Channel off the coast of Pas-de-Calais, France on 26 October 1962 whilst on a voyage from Arkhangelsk, Soviet Union to Calais. She broke in two and sank on 19 November.
