= SS Walter M. Christiansen =

Liberty ship of WWII

History

United States
- Name: Walter M. Christiansen
- Namesake: Walter M. Christiansen
- Owner: War Shipping Administration (WSA)
- Operator: American Range Liberty Line
- Ordered: as type (EC2-S-C1) hull, MC hull 2511
- Awarded: 23 April 1943
- Builder: St. Johns River Shipbuilding Company, Jacksonville, Florida
- Cost: $920,654
- Yard number: 75
- Way number: 3
- Laid down: 15 November 1944
- Launched: 16 December 1944
- Sponsored by: Mrs. Russell Knapp
- Completed: 27 December 1944
- Identification: Call sign: ANDI
- Fate: Sold for commercial use, 17 January 1951, withdrawn from fleet, 21 February 1951

United States
- Name: Sea Comet
- Owner: Zenith Steamship Co.
- Operator: D.J. Negroponte Inc.
- Fate: Sold, 1951

United States
- Name: Ocean Ulla
- Owner: Ocean Transportation Co.
- Operator: Maritime Overseas Corp.
- Fate: Sold, February 1959

United States
- Name: Valiant Hope
- Owner: Hope Steamship Corp.
- Operator: Ocean Carriers Corp.
- Fate: Sold, March 1960

Liberia
- Name: Ocean Rover
- Owner: Pacific Ocean Shipping Co.
- Operator: Amerind Steamship Co.
- Fate: Sold, 1960

Liberia
- Name: Pacific Venture
- Owner: Interocean Navigation Co.
- Operator: Associated Maritime Industries
- Fate: Scrapped, 1967

General characteristics
- Class & type: Liberty ship; type EC2-S-C1, standard
- Tonnage: 10,865 LT DWT; 7,176 GRT
- Displacement: 3,380 long tons (3,434 t) (light); 14,245 long tons (14,474 t) (max)
- Length: 441 feet 6 inches (135 m) oa; 416 feet (127 m) pp; 427 feet (130 m) lwl
- Beam: 57 feet (17 m)
- Draft: 27 ft 9.25 in (8.4646 m)
- Installed power: 2 × Oil fired 450 °F (232 °C) boilers, operating at 220 psi (1,500 kPa); 2,500 hp (1,900 kW)
- Propulsion: 1 × triple-expansion steam engine, (manufactured by General Machinery Corp., Hamilton, Ohio); 1 × screw propeller
- Speed: 11.5 knots (21.3 km/h; 13.2 mph)
- Capacity: 562,608 cubic feet (15,931 m^{3}) (grain); 499,573 cubic feet (14,146 m^{3}) (bale)
- Complement: 38–62 USMM; 21–40 USNAG
- Armament: Varied by ship; Bow-mounted 3-inch (76 mm)/50-caliber gun; Stern-mounted 4-inch (102 mm)/50-caliber gun; 2–8 × single 20-millimeter (0.79 in) Oerlikon anti-aircraft (AA) cannons and/or, 2–8 × 37-millimeter (1.46 in) M1 AA guns

SS Walter M. Christiansen was a Liberty ship built in the United States during World War II. She was named after Walter M. Christiansen, the Chief Engineer of SS W. L. Steed, which was sunk 2 February 1942, by German submarine U-103.

== Construction ==
Walter M. Christiansen was laid down on 15 November 1944, under a Maritime Commission (MARCOM) contract, MC hull 2511, by the St. Johns River Shipbuilding Company, Jacksonville, Florida; she was sponsored by Mrs. Russell Knapp, the widow of the namesake, and launched on 16 December 1944.

== History ==
She was allocated to American Range Liberty Line, on 27 December 1944. On 25 March 1948, she was placed in the Hudson River Reserve Fleet, Jones Point, New York. She was sold for commercial use, 17 January 1951, to Zenith Steamship Co. She was withdrawn from the fleet, 21 February 1951.

== Bibliography ==
- "St. John's River Shipbuilding, Jacksonville FL". www.ShipbuildingHistory.com. 16 October 2010.
- Maritime Administration. "Walter M. Christiansen". Ship History Database Vessel Status Card. U.S. Department of Transportation, Maritime Administration.
- Davies, James (May 2004). "Specifications (As-Built)" (PDF). p. 23.
- "SS Walter M. Christiansen".
