= SS Melville E. Stone =

World War II Liberty ship of the United States

History

United States
- Name: Melville E. Stone
- Namesake: Melville Elijah Stone
- Laid down: 2 July 1943
- Launched: 24 July 1943
- Fate: Torpedoed and sunk on 24 November 1943

General characteristics
- Type: Type EC2-S-C1 cargo ship
- Tonnage: 10,856 DWT
- Displacement: 14,245 tons
- Length: 135 m (442 ft 11 in)
- Beam: 17.3 m (56 ft 9 in)
- Draft: 8.5 m (27 ft 11 in)
- Propulsion: Two oil-fired boilers, triple-expansion steam engine, single screw, 2,500 hp (1,900 kW)
- Speed: 11 to 11.5 knots (20.4 to 21.3 km/h; 12.7 to 13.2 mph)
- Range: 23,000 mi (37,000 km)
- Complement: 42 Merchant Marine (10 officers, 32 crewmen)
- Armament: 1 × stern-mounted 4 in (100 mm) deck gun; 1 × 3 in (76 mm) gun; 8 × 20 mm anti-aircraft guns

SS Melville E. Stone was a Liberty ship built in the United States during World War II. She was named after Melville Elijah Stone (August 22, 1848 – February 15, 1929), a newspaper publisher, founder of the Chicago Daily News, and one time general manager of the reorganized Associated Press.

== History ==
The ship's keel was laid in Permanente Metals Richmond, California, Yard 2 on July 2, 1943, as hull number 1715, type EC2-S-C1. She was launched on July 24, 1943, and delivered on August 4, 1943. The Melville E. Stone was 22 days on the ways, 12 days in the water and 34 days to delivery. After delivery to the War Shipping Administration, she was operated by Norton Lilly & Company, New York.

At 06:14 hours on November 24, 1943, the unescorted Melville E. Stone was hit by two torpedoes from the German submarine U-516 about 100 miles (160 km) northwest of Cristóbal, Canal Zone, at 10°29′N 80°20′W. The ship had been at sea less than seven hours when the torpedoes were spotted by a lookout. The first torpedo struck on the port side in the settling tank and the second hit ten seconds later near #4 hold. The explosions opened large holes in the side and extensively damaged the main and auxiliary engines. As the ship settled rapidly on an even keel, the 42-man complement, 23 armed guards and 23 passengers (military personnel) abandoned ship immediately in rough seas. Two of the lifeboats capsized from the suction created by the ship, which sank within eight minutes and several men drowned, including the master. Three boats got away and were later picked up men from rafts and debris. The survivors were later spotted by an aircraft, which dropped flares so that the American submarine chasers USS SC-1023 and USS SC-662 could pick them up. Five officers, seven crewmen, two armed guards and one passenger were lost.
