= SS Halton R. Carey =

World War II Liberty ship of the United States

History

United States
- Name: Halton R. Carey
- Namesake: Halton R. Carey
- Ordered: as type (EC2-S-C1) hull, MC hull 2398
- Builder: J.A. Jones Construction, Brunswick, Georgia
- Cost: $817,209
- Yard number: 183
- Way number: 1
- Laid down: 21 December 1944
- Launched: 25 January 1945
- Sponsored by: Mrs. A.W. Henson
- Completed: 7 February 1945
- Identification: Call Signal: ANIA
- Fate: Laid up in the National Defense Reserve Fleet, Wilmington, North Carolina, 17 May 1948; Sold for scrapping, 28 May 1963

General characteristics
- Class & type: Liberty ship; type EC2-S-C1, standard
- Tonnage: 10,865 LT DWT; 7,176 GRT
- Displacement: 3,380 long tons (3,434 t) (light); 14,245 long tons (14,474 t) (max)
- Length: 441 feet 6 inches (135 m) oa; 416 feet (127 m) pp; 427 feet (130 m) lwl
- Beam: 57 feet (17 m)
- Draft: 27 ft 9.25 in (8.4646 m)
- Installed power: 2 × Oil fired 450 °F (232 °C) boilers, operating at 220 psi (1,500 kPa); 2,500 hp (1,900 kW)
- Propulsion: 1 × triple-expansion steam engine, (manufactured by General Machinery Corp., Hamilton, Ohio); 1 × screw propeller
- Speed: 11.5 knots (21.3 km/h; 13.2 mph)
- Capacity: 562,608 cubic feet (15,931 m^{3}) (grain); 499,573 cubic feet (14,146 m^{3}) (bale)
- Complement: 38–62 USMM; 21–40 USNAG
- Armament: Varied by ship; Bow-mounted 3-inch (76 mm)/50-caliber gun; Stern-mounted 4-inch (102 mm)/50-caliber gun; 2–8 × single 20-millimeter (0.79 in) Oerlikon anti-aircraft (AA) cannons and/or, 2–8 × 37-millimeter (1.46 in) M1 AA guns

SS Halton R. Carey was a Liberty ship built in the United States during World War II. She was named after Halton R. Carey, who was lost at sea while he was an ordinary seaman on the tanker SS W.D. Anderson, after she was torpedoed by German submarine U-504, on 22 February 1942, off Florida.

== Construction ==
Halton R. Carey was laid down on 21 December 1944, under a United States Maritime Commission (MARCOM) contract, MC hull 2398, by J.A. Jones Construction, Brunswick, Georgia; she was sponsored by Mrs. A.W. Henson, and launched on 25 January 1945.

== History ==
She was allocated to American Liberty Line, on 7 February 1945. On 17 May 1948, she was laid up in the National Defense Reserve Fleet, in Wilmington, North Carolina. On 28 May 1963, she was sold to Northern Metals Co., for scrapping.

== Bibliography ==
- "Jones Construction, Brunswick GA". ShipbuildingHistory.com. 13 October 2010.
- "Liberty Ships – World War II".
- Maritime Administration. "Halton R. Carey". Ship History Database Vessel Status Card. U.S. Department of Transportation, Maritime Administration. Archived from the original on 12 December 2019.
- Davies, James (May 2004). "Specifications (As-Built)" (PDF). p. 23.
- "SS Halton R. Carey".
