= SS George G. Crawford =

World War II Liberty ship of the United States

History

United States
- Name: George G. Crawford
- Namesake: George G. Crawford
- Ordered: as type (EC2-S-C1) hull, MC hull 1510
- Builder: J.A. Jones Construction, Brunswick, Georgia
- Cost: $1,370,642
- Yard number: 126
- Way number: 4
- Laid down: 16 November 1943
- Launched: 1 January 1944
- Sponsored by: Mrs. I.M. Aiden
- Completed: 13 January 1944
- Identification: Call Signal: KVLY
- Fate: Laid up in National Defense Reserve Fleet, James River Group, Lee Hall, Virginia, 21 September 1945; Sold for commercial use, 20 February 1947

Greece
- Name: Megalohar
- Owner: John Theodorakopoulos and Manuel E. Kulukundis
- Acquired: 20 February 1947
- Fate: Scrapped, February 1968

General characteristics
- Class & type: Liberty ship; type EC2-S-C1, standard
- Tonnage: 10,865 LT DWT; 7,176 GRT
- Displacement: 3,380 long tons (3,434 t) (light); 14,245 long tons (14,474 t) (max)
- Length: 441 feet 6 inches (135 m) oa; 416 feet (127 m) pp; 427 feet (130 m) lwl
- Beam: 57 feet (17 m)
- Draft: 27 ft 9.25 in (8.4646 m)
- Installed power: 2 × Oil fired 450 °F (232 °C) boilers, operating at 220 psi (1,500 kPa); 2,500 hp (1,900 kW)
- Propulsion: 1 × triple-expansion steam engine, (manufactured by General Machinery Corp., Hamilton, Ohio); 1 × screw propeller
- Speed: 11.5 knots (21.3 km/h; 13.2 mph)
- Capacity: 562,608 cubic feet (15,931 m^{3}) (grain); 499,573 cubic feet (14,146 m^{3}) (bale)
- Complement: 38–62 USMM; 21–40 USNAG
- Armament: Varied by ship; Bow-mounted 3-inch (76 mm)/50-caliber gun; Stern-mounted 4-inch (102 mm)/50-caliber gun; 2–8 × single 20-millimeter (0.79 in) Oerlikon anti-aircraft (AA) cannons and/or, 2–8 × 37-millimeter (1.46 in) M1 AA guns

SS George G. Crawford was a Liberty ship built in the United States during World War II. She was named after George G. Crawford, the president of the Tennessee Coal, Iron and Railroad Company in Birmingham, Alabama and later president of the Jones and Laughlin Steel Company in Pittsburgh, Pennsylvania.

== Construction ==
George G. Crawford was laid down on 16 November 1943, under a Maritime Commission (MARCOM) contract, MC hull 1510, by J.A. Jones Construction, Brunswick, Georgia; she was sponsored by Mrs. I.M. Aiden, and launched on 1 January 1944.

== History ==
She was allocated to the American Liberty Steamship Co., on 13 January 1944. On 21 September 1945, she was laid up in the National Defense Reserve Fleet in the James River Group, Lee Hall, Virginia. On 20 February 1947, she was sold to John Theodorakopoulos and Manuel E. Kulukundis, for $544,506, for commercial use. She was withdrawn from the fleet on 27 February 1947. She was renamed Megalohar and scrapped in February 1968.

== Bibliography ==
- "Jones Construction, Brunswick GA". www.ShipbuildingHistory.com. 13 October 2010.
- "Liberty Ships – World War II".
- Maritime Administration. "George G. Crawford". Ship History Database Vessel Status Card. U.S. Department of Transportation, Maritime Administration. Archived from the original on 12 December 2019.
- Davies, James (May 2004). "Specifications (As-Built)" (PDF). p. 23.
- "SS George G. Crawford".
