= USS Pemiscot =

Cargo ship of the United States Navy

History

United States
- Name: Coastal Competitor (1944–1945, 1945–); Pemiscot (1945)
- Namesake: Pemiscot County, Missouri
- Ordered: as type (C1-M-AV1) hull, MC hull 2155
- Builder: Globe Shipbuilding Co., Superior, Wisconsin
- Yard number: 122
- Laid down: 7 July 1944
- Launched: 18 November 1944
- Acquired: 12 September 1945
- Commissioned: scheduled, 12 September 1945, delayed
- Stricken: 5 December 1945
- Identification: Hull symbol: AK-201; Code letters: NXMR
- Fate: Returned to US Maritime Commission (MARCOM), 28 September 1945

History

United States
- Name: Coastal Competitor
- Owner: MARCOM
- Operator: American Liberty Steamship Corp. (1945); United Fruit Company (1946); American West African Line, Inc. (1946); Lykes Bros. SS Company, Inc. (1946–); Atlantic Steamship Line (1948)
- Acquired: 31 October 1945
- In service: 31 October 1945
- Out of service: 3 May 1948
- Fate: Sold, 13 July 1956

History

Brazil
- Name: Coastal Competitor
- Operator: Companhia Nacional de Navegacao Costerira, Patrimonio Nacional
- Acquired: 13 July 1956
- In service: 25 December 1956
- Fate: Scrapped 1975

General characteristics
- Class & type: Alamosa-class cargo ship
- Type: C1-M-AV1
- Tonnage: 5,032 long tons deadweight (DWT)
- Displacement: 2,382 long tons (2,420 t) (standard); 7,450 long tons (7,570 t) (full load)
- Length: 388 ft 8 in (118.47 m)
- Beam: 50 ft (15 m)
- Draft: 21 ft 1 in (6.43 m)
- Installed power: 1 × Nordberg, TSM 6 diesel engine; 1,750 shp (1,300 kW)
- Propulsion: 1 × propeller
- Speed: 11.5 kn (21.3 km/h; 13.2 mph)
- Capacity: 3,945 t (3,883 long tons) DWT; 9,830 cu ft (278 m^{3}) (refrigerated); 227,730 cu ft (6,449 m^{3}) (non-refrigerated)
- Complement: 15 Officers; 70 Enlisted
- Armament: 1 × 3 in (76 mm)/50 caliber dual purpose gun (DP); 6 × 20 mm (0.8 in) Oerlikon anti-aircraft (AA) cannons

USS Pemiscot (AK-201) was an Alamosa-class cargo ship that was constructed for the US Navy during the closing period of World War II. By the time she was scheduled for commissioning, the war's end caused her to be declared “excess to needs” and she was returned to the US Government and struck by the Navy.

== Construction ==
Pemiscot was laid down under US Maritime Commission (MARCOM) contract, MC hull 2155, by Globe Shipbuilding Co., Superior, Wisconsin, 7 July 1944; launched 18 November 1944; and transferred down the Great Lakes and the Mississippi River to New Orleans, Louisiana, between January and April 1945. Completed at the Pendleton Shipyard Co., she was transferred to the Navy 12 September 1945 at New Orleans.

== Service history ==
Pemiscot was scheduled to commission 12 September. However, because of the Allied victory in the Pacific Ocean theatre of operations, her commissioning was delayed.

== Inactivation ==
On 28 September she was ordered returned to the U.S. Maritime Commission, and was delivered to the War Shipping Administration (WSA) at New Orleans 31 October. Her name was struck from the Naval Register 5 December 1945. She was subsequently renamed Coastal Competitor.

== Merchant service ==
Coastal Competitor was used by several shipping companies from 1945 to 1948, when she was placed in the reserve fleet.

On 13 July 1956, she was sold to Companhia Nacional de Navegacao Costerira, Patrimonio Nacional, of Brazil, for $693,682, under the condition that she be used for coastal shipping. She was delivered on 25 December 1956. The ship was scrapped in 1975.

== Bibliography ==
Online resources

- "Pemiscot". Dictionary of American Naval Fighting Ships. Naval History and Heritage Command. 19 August 2015. This article incorporates text from this source, which is in the public domain.
- "C1 Cargo Ships". www.ShipbuildingHistory.com. 28 August 2009.
- "USS Pemiscot (AK-201)". NavSource. 24 June 2011.
- "Coastal Competitor". United States Department of Transportation. Archived from the original on November 4, 2016.
