= Norton Lilly International =

US Shipping Company

Norton Lilly International (Norton Lilly Company)
- Industry: Shipping
- Founded: 1841 in New York City, United States
- Area served: World Wide
- Key people: John Norton Jr.; Edward N. Norton; Augustus Norton; Joseph Thomas Lilly; Richard von Appen (2005- ); Andreas Ebensperger (2014- )
- Parent: Strachan Shipping Agency
- Website: https://nortonlilly.com

Norton Lilly International, was founded as Norton Lilly & Company in 1841 in New York City by John Norton Jr. John Norton, Jr. shipping experience started in 1840 when he became a partner in Russell & Norton, a shipping agency for with routes from Florida to West India. The ship operated out of Apalachicola, Florida, and in 1851 added an Australia route to the line. In 1854, John Norton Jr., and his son, Edward N. Norton, opened his own shipping agency, Norton & Company and became the manager of the sailing ship Sea Flower , which operated out of Pensacola, Florida. Norton and son expanded and added a South America route with packet sailing ships. John Norton Jr. second son, Augustus Norton, joined the firm in 1878. Augustus Norton died on October 17, 1889, and a year later John Norton Jr. died on October 30, 1890. Edward N. Norton continued to run Russell & Norton, but in 1907, add a partner Joseph Thomas Lilly. With the new partnership, the firm was renamed Norton Lilly & Company.

Norton Lilly & Company supported both the World War I and World War II efforts.

== Norton Lilly International ==
In 2002, Norton Lilly & Company partnered with Strachan Shipping Agency, Nortec Canada and Norton Lilly Panama and Ker Norton Marine. Norton Lilly International operates logistics for dry bulk shipping, tanker (gas and oil), reefer ships, container ships, and passenger liners to over 70 ports worldwide.

Norton Lilly International has offices in:

- USA:
  - Baltimore, Boston, Brunswick, Charleston, Jacksonville, Jacksonville, Miami, New York - New Jersey (Port Elizabeth), Norfolk, Philadelphia, Port Canaveral, Providence, RI, Savannah, Wilmington, DE, Wilmington, NC, Beaumont, Brownsville, Corpus Christi, Cut Off, LA, Freeport, Houston, Lake Charles, Mobile, New Orleans, Saint Rose, Tampa, Long Beach - Los Angeles, Port Hueneme, Portland, San Diego, San Francisco - Oakland, Seattle, Stockton, and Tacoma.
- Canada:
  - Montreal, Stephenville, Halifax, and Vancouver
- Caribbean:
  - San Juan, Panama City/Balboa, Bridgetown, St. Croix, Trinidad,
- Mexico:
  - Mexico City, Veracruz, Altamira / Tampico, Coatzacoalcos (Pajaritos Terminal), Tuxpan, Mazanillo, Lazaro Cardenas, Ensenada / Rosarito, Progreso, and Altamaritima,
- Pacific:
  - Guam, Saipan, and Honolulu.
- Panama:
  - Panama City - Balboa, and Cristobal

== Norton Lilly Management Corp. - World War II ==
Norton Lilly & Company fleet of ships were used to help the World War II effort. During World War II, Norton Lilly & Company's Norton Lilly Management Corp. operated Merchant navy ships for the United States Shipping Board. Norton Lilly & Company was also active with charter shipping with the Maritime Commission and War Shipping Administration. Norton Lilly & Company operated Liberty ships for the merchant navy. The ship was run by its Norton Lilly & Company crew and the US Navy supplied United States Navy Armed Guards to man the deck guns and radio.

== World War II Ships ==
Liberty ships operated:

- Nachman Syrkin
- Laurence J. Gallagher
- SS Harold Dossett
- Henry Bergh 31.5.44 Ashore in fog Farallon Island, Calif. Broke in two - total loss.
- SS Donald W. Bain
- SS Melville E. Stone on Nov. 24, 1943 was torpedoed and sunk by U-516 south of Panama
- John Colter
- Thomas Condon
- William H. Moody
- Clyde Austin Dunning
- Samdon
- Sameveron
  - Other:
- War Drake
  - Post war Liberty ships:
- Joel Chandler Harris

== See also ==
- World War II United States Merchant Navy
- John M. Franklin
