= SS Horace Binney =

Liberty ship of WWII

History

United States
- Name: Horace Binney
- Namesake: Horace Binney
- Owner: War Shipping Administration (WSA)
- Operator: American Export Lines, Inc.
- Ordered: as type (EC2-S-C1) hull, MCE hull 62
- Awarded: 14 March 1941
- Builder: Bethlehem-Fairfield Shipyard, Baltimore, Maryland
- Cost: $1,076,481
- Yard number: 2049
- Way number: 8
- Laid down: 5 July 1942
- Launched: 25 August 1942
- Sponsored by: Miss Bertha Joseph
- Completed: 31 August 1942
- Identification: Call sign: KGHH
- Fate: Mined, 8 May 1945, Constructive Total Loss, sold for scrapping, 1 April 1948

General characteristics
- Class & type: Liberty ship; type EC2-S-C1, standard
- Tonnage: 10,865 LT DWT; 7,176 GRT
- Displacement: 3,380 long tons (3,434 t) (light); 14,245 long tons (14,474 t) (max)
- Length: 441 feet 6 inches (135 m) oa; 416 feet (127 m) pp; 427 feet (130 m) lwl
- Beam: 57 feet (17 m)
- Draft: 27 ft 9.25 in (8.4646 m)
- Installed power: 2 × Oil fired 450 °F (232 °C) boilers, operating at 220 psi (1,500 kPa); 2,500 hp (1,900 kW)
- Propulsion: 1 × triple-expansion steam engine, (manufactured by Worthington Pump & Machinery Corp, Harrison, New Jersey); 1 × screw propeller
- Speed: 11.5 knots (21.3 km/h; 13.2 mph)
- Capacity: 562,608 cubic feet (15,931 m^{3}) (grain); 499,573 cubic feet (14,146 m^{3}) (bale)
- Complement: 38–62 USMM; 21–40 USNAG
- Armament: Varied by ship; Bow-mounted 3-inch (76 mm)/50-caliber gun; Stern-mounted 4-inch (102 mm)/50-caliber gun; 2–8 × single 20-millimeter (0.79 in) Oerlikon anti-aircraft (AA) cannons and/or, 2–8 × 37-millimeter (1.46 in) M1 AA guns

SS Horace Binney was a Liberty ship built in the United States during World War II. She was named after Horace Binney, an American lawyer, author, and public speaker who served as an Anti-Jacksonian in the United States House of Representatives.

== Construction ==
Horace Binney was laid down on 5 July 1942, under a Maritime Commission (MARCOM) contract, MCE hull 62, by the Bethlehem-Fairfield Shipyard, Baltimore, Maryland; sponsored by Miss Bertha Joseph, the secretary of Senator George L. P. Radcliffe of Maryland, and was launched on 25 August 1942.

== History ==
She was allocated to American Export Lines, Inc., on 31 August 1942. On 8 May 1945, she was mined off the coast of Dunkirk, France, at 51°12′N 02°27′E, and beached at Deal, England, where she broke in two. On 1 April 1948, she was sold to the Belgium company Etablisements Dohmen et Habets SA., and scrapped in Antwerp.

== Bibliography ==
- "Bethlehem-Fairfield, Baltimore MD". www.ShipbuildingHistory.com. 14 August 2008.
- Maritime Administration. "Horace Binney". Ship History Database Vessel Status Card. U.S. Department of Transportation, Maritime Administration.
- Davies, James (May 2004). "Specifications (As-Built)" (PDF). p. 23.
- "SS Horace Binney".
