= SS Harold Dossett =

World War II Liberty ship of the United States

History

United States
- Name: Harold Dossett
- Namesake: Harold Dossett
- Ordered: as type (EC2-S-C1) hull, MC hull 2399
- Builder: J.A. Jones Construction, Brunswick, Georgia
- Cost: $842,149
- Yard number: 184
- Way number: 2
- Laid down: 26 December 1944
- Launched: 30 January 1945
- Sponsored by: Mrs. L.A. Graves
- Completed: 15 February 1945
- Identification: Call Signal: ANIB
- Fate: Laid up in the National Defense Reserve Fleet, Hudson River Group, 23 December 1947; Sold for scrapping, 16 September 1970

General characteristics
- Class & type: Liberty ship; type EC2-S-C1, standard
- Tonnage: 10,865 LT DWT; 7,176 GRT
- Displacement: 3,380 long tons (3,434 t) (light); 14,245 long tons (14,474 t) (max)
- Length: 441 feet 6 inches (135 m) oa; 416 feet (127 m) pp; 427 feet (130 m) lwl
- Beam: 57 feet (17 m)
- Draft: 27 ft 9.25 in (8.4646 m)
- Installed power: 2 × Oil fired 450 °F (232 °C) boilers, operating at 220 psi (1,500 kPa); 2,500 hp (1,900 kW)
- Propulsion: 1 × triple-expansion steam engine, (manufactured by General Machinery Corp., Hamilton, Ohio); 1 × screw propeller
- Speed: 11.5 knots (21.3 km/h; 13.2 mph)
- Capacity: 562,608 cubic feet (15,931 m^{3}) (grain); 499,573 cubic feet (14,146 m^{3}) (bale)
- Complement: 38–62 USMM; 21–40 USNAG
- Armament: Varied by ship; Bow-mounted 3-inch (76 mm)/50-caliber gun; Stern-mounted 4-inch (102 mm)/50-caliber gun; 2–8 × single 20-millimeter (0.79 in) Oerlikon anti-aircraft (AA) cannons and/or, 2–8 × 37-millimeter (1.46 in) M1 AA guns

SS Harold Dossett was a Liberty ship built in the United States during World War II. She was named after Harold Dossett, who was lost at sea while he was a messman on SS Samuel Q. Brown, after she was torpedoed by German submarine U-103, on 23 May 1942, off Cuba.

== Construction ==
Harold Dossett was laid down on 26 December 1944, under a Maritime Commission (MARCOM) contract, MC hull 2399, by J.A. Jones Construction, Brunswick, Georgia; she was sponsored by Mrs. L.A. Graves, and launched on 30 January 1945.

== History ==
She was allocated to the Norton Lilly Management Agency, on 15 February 1945. On 23 December 1947, she was laid up in the National Defense Reserve Fleet, in the Hudson River Group. On 24 June 1953, she was withdrawn from the fleet to be loaded with grain, she returned loaded on 6 July 1953. On 23 April 1957, she was withdrawn to be unload, she returned on empty 1 May 1957. On 9 July 1958, she was withdrawn from the fleet to be loaded with grain, she returned loaded on 25 July 1958. On 4 March 1959, she was withdrawn to be unload, she returned on empty 10 March 1959. On 19 November 1960, she was withdrawn from the fleet to be loaded with grain, she returned loaded on 29 November 1960. On 26 February 1963, she was withdrawn to be unload, she returned on empty 1 March 1963. On 8 September 1970, she was sold for $90,500 to Eckhardt & Co., G.m.b.H., West Germany, to be scrapped. She was removed from the fleet on 16 September 1970.

== Bibliography ==
- "Jones Construction, Brunswick GA". www.ShipbuildingHistory.com. 13 October 2010.
- "Liberty Ships – World War II".
- Maritime Administration. "Harold Dossett". Ship History Database Vessel Status Card. U.S. Department of Transportation, Maritime Administration. Archived from the original on 12 December 2019.
- Davies, James (May 2004). "Specifications (As-Built)" (PDF). p. 23.
- "SS Harold Dossett".
