= SS Harald Torsvik =

Liberty ship of WWII

History

United States
- Name: Henry B. Plant; Harald Torsvik
- Namesake: Henry B. Plant; Harald Torsvik
- Owner: War Shipping Administration (WSA)
- Ordered: as type (EC2-S-C1) hull, MC hull 2502
- Awarded: 23 April 1943
- Builder: St. Johns River Shipbuilding Company, Jacksonville, Florida
- Cost: $955,581
- Yard number: 66
- Way number: 6
- Laid down: 25 September 1944
- Launched: 28 October 1944
- Completed: 6 November 1944
- Fate: Transferred to Norway under Lend-Lease, 6 November 1944

Norway
- Name: Harald Torsvik
- Owner: Norway
- Fate: Sold, 1946

Norway
- Name: Grey County
- Owner: Klaus Wiese Hansen
- Fate: Sold, 1951

Panama
- Name: Aegean Sailor
- Owner: Cia Nav del Egero
- Operator: Lemos & Pateras
- Refit: Converted to M/V, 1960
- Fate: Sold, 1960

Greece
- Name: Kyramorouko
- Owner: Marafecto Cia Nav
- Fate: Sold, 1964

Greece
- Name: Spalmatori
- Owner: Spalmatori Cia Nav
- Fate: Sold, 1966

Greece
- Name: Anastassios
- Owner: Astro-Mareante Nav
- Fate: Sold, 1967

Greece
- Name: Stymfalos
- Owner: Stymfalos SA
- Fate: Scrapped, 1968

General characteristics
- Class & type: Liberty ship; type EC2-S-C1, standard
- Tonnage: 10,865 LT DWT; 7,176 GRT
- Displacement: 3,380 long tons (3,434 t) (light); 14,245 long tons (14,474 t) (max)
- Length: 441 feet 6 inches (135 m) oa; 416 feet (127 m) pp; 427 feet (130 m) lwl
- Beam: 57 feet (17 m)
- Draft: 27 ft 9.25 in (8.4646 m)
- Installed power: 2 × Oil fired 450 °F (232 °C) boilers, operating at 220 psi (1,500 kPa); 2,500 hp (1,900 kW)
- Propulsion: 1 × triple-expansion steam engine, (manufactured by General Machinery Corp., Hamilton, Ohio); 1 × screw propeller
- Speed: 11.5 knots (21.3 km/h; 13.2 mph)
- Capacity: 562,608 cubic feet (15,931 m^{3}) (grain); 499,573 cubic feet (14,146 m^{3}) (bale)
- Complement: 38–62 USMM; 21–40 USNAG
- Armament: Varied by ship; Bow-mounted 3-inch (76 mm)/50-caliber gun; Stern-mounted 4-inch (102 mm)/50-caliber gun; 2–8 × single 20-millimeter (0.79 in) Oerlikon anti-aircraft (AA) cannons and/or, 2–8 × 37-millimeter (1.46 in) M1 AA guns

SS Harald Torsvik was a Liberty ship built in the United States during World War II. She was first named after Henry B. Plant, an American businessman, entrepreneur, investor involved with many transportation interests and projects, mostly railroads, in the southeastern United States. She was transferred to Norway after launching and renamed Harald Torsvik after Harald Torsvik, a Norwegian lawyer that aided refugees fleeing to England during World War II, he was captured by the Nazis and executed.

== Construction ==
Henry B. Plant was laid down on 25 September 1944, under a Maritime Commission (MARCOM) contract, MC hull 2502, by the St. Johns River Shipbuilding Company, Jacksonville, Florida; and was launched on 28 October 1944.

== History ==
She was transferred to Norway, under the Lend-Lease program, on 6 November 1944, and renamed Harald Torsvik. She was sold for commercial use, 10 October 1946, to Klaus Wiese Hansen, for $574,830.27, and renamed Grey County.

== Bibliography ==
- "St. John's River Shipbuilding, Jacksonville FL". www.ShipbuildingHistory.com. 16 October 2010.
- Maritime Administration. "Harald Torsvik". Ship History Database Vessel Status Card. U.S. Department of Transportation, Maritime Administration.
- Davies, James (May 2004). "Specifications (As-Built)" (PDF). p. 23.
- "SS Henry B. Plant".
