= American Range-Liberty Lines, Inc. =

Former US shipping company

- Company type: Shareholder
- Industry: transportation and shipping
- Founded: 1943 in New York City
- Defunct: December 1, 1944
- Fate: Separated into two companies
- Key people: Jacob L. Alwine; Lucille H. Rogers; A. D. Rissmiller
- Parent: American Range Lines, Inc.; American Liberty Steamship Corporation

American Range-Liberty Lines, Inc. was founded as a joint venture of American Range Lines, Inc. and American Liberty Steamship Corporation of New York City on September 8, 1943. American Range-Liberty Lines, Inc. President was Jacob L. Alwine. A. D. Rissmiller was American Liberty Steamship Corporation president. The joint venture to operate was approved by the General Agency Assignment for the War Shipping Administration.

== Joint venture ==
The American Range-Liberty Lines, Inc. joint venture terms were valid for the time of the World War II Shipping Administration and General Agency agreement. At the end of the agreement, the joint venture would end. American Range Lines, Inc. was founded in 1936 and did shipping from its office and docks in Philadelphia, Pennsylvania. The American Liberty Steamship Corporation was founded in 1916 with route from New York and Baltimore to Galveston and Houston. The joint venture was founded as each did not have enough assets to charter ships with the War Shipping Administration and the Maritime Commission. With the joint venture American Range Lines, Inc. changed its name to American Range-Liberty Lines, Inc. The joint venture did not work out well between the managers of the two companies. American Range Lines, Inc. and American Liberty Steamship Corporation asked the time War Shipping Administration to end the joint venture before the end of the agreement. The War Shipping Administration agreed and the joint venture was terminated on December 1, 1944. The tax and separation issues of the two companies was settled in 1951 in the case of American Range Lines Inc. v. Comm'r of Internal Revenue.

== World War II ==
American Range-Liberty Lines, Inc. fleet of ships that were used to help the World War II effort. During World War II American Range-Liberty Lines, Inc. operated Merchant navy ships for the United States Shipping Board. During World War II W American Range-Liberty Lines, Inc. was active with charter shipping with the Maritime Commission and War Shipping Administration. American Range-Liberty Lines, Inc. operated Liberty ships for the merchant navy. The ship was run by its American Range-Liberty Lines, Inc. crew and the US Navy supplied United States Navy Armed Guards to man the deck guns and radio.

== Ships ==
Liberty ship of World War II

  - World War II operated:
  - Liberty Ships:
- SS George G. Crawford
- Halton R. Carey
- Walter Kidde
- SS Walter M. Christiansen
- Webb Miller
- Stephen W. Gambrill
- Robert S. Lovett
- John La Farge
- Joseph I. Kemp
- Thomas W. Gregory
- Cecil N. Bean
- Leo J. Duster
  - Other:
- USS Pemiscot (AK-201) a type C1-M-AV1 cargo ship
  - Owned ships
- Marsodak, sunk during war on 15 Aug. 1942 as Balladier, built in 1919 by Submarine Boat Company
- Plow City, sunk during war on 22 May 1942, built in 1920 by Submarine Boat
- Suwied, sunk during war on 8 Jun 1942, built in 1919 by Submarine Boat Corp
  - Managed ship:
- SS Colabee was owned by the Colabee Steamship Company, but managed by American Range Lines. Sunk on 3 Mar 1942, built in 1920 by Atlantic Corporation, Portsmouth, New Hampshire

== See also ==
- World War II United States Merchant Navy
