= Black Diamond Steamship Company =

Passengers and Shipping Company

- Industry: Shipping, transportation
- Founded: 1919 in New York, United States
- Defunct: 1955
- Area served: Transatlantic, WW2 Worldwide
- Key people: J.E. Dockendorff, Hugh McLennan

Black Diamond Steamship Company (BDSC) operated passenger and cargo liners from New York City to Rotterdam and Antwerp. It was founded by J.E. Dockendorff in 1919, and named the American Diamond Line by the United States Shipping Board. The company was profitable in the 1920s and early 1930s. Prior to the United States' entry into World War II, the nation's neutrality policy ended much of the lines trade. Dockendorff stepped down as a principal executive in 1934, selling the only one of the company's 21 ships not owned by the government: New Britain, which he had bought in 1918. During World War II the company sold most of its American Diamond Line ships and moved to charter shipping with the Maritime Commission and War Shipping Administration. During the war, the Black Diamond Steamship Company operated Victory ships and Liberty ships. These ships were operated by their own crews; the US Navy supplied United States Navy Armed Guards to man the deck guns and radio. The most common armament mounted on these merchant ships were the MK II 20mm Oerlikon autocannon and the 3"/50, 4"/50, and 5"/38 deck guns. After the war there were many surplus ships and much competition. Black Diamond Steamship Company continued to operate after the war, but finally closed in 1955.

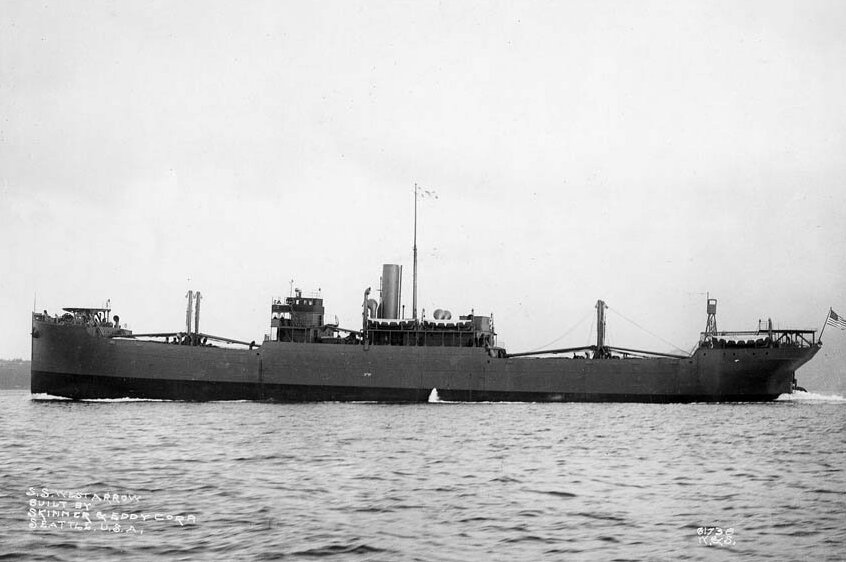
Black Osprey in 1918

== American Diamond Lines ==
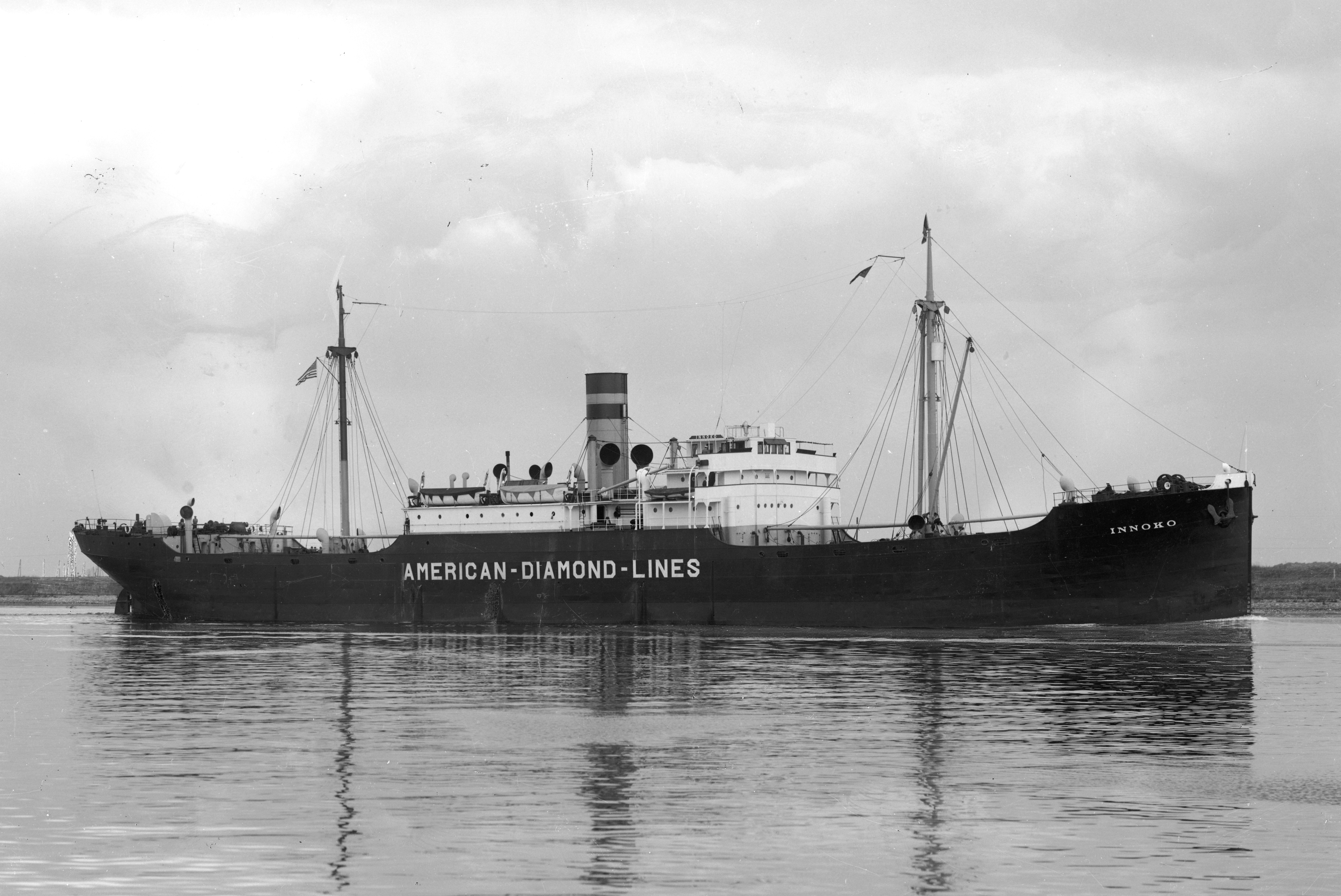
General cargo ship Innoko (1919)

American Diamond Line was started at the end of World War I in 1919, by the United States Shipping Board. American Diamond Lines became a subsidiary of Black Diamond Steamship Company in 1920, a profitable company in the 1920s and early 1930s that operated 20 ships. In 1929 the American Diamond Line was put up for sale. Two companies lobbied the US Shipping Board for American Diamond Lines: Black Diamond Shipping Corporation and the Cosmopolitan Shipping Company. The lobby and appeals were taken all the way to President Herbert Hoover. Then in 1931 the Shipping Board sided with Black Diamond Steamship Corporation, which purchased back American Diamond Lines. Due to the USA's neutrality in early war years, American Diamond Lines charted some of its ships to foreign-flag shipping companies in order to continue its European trade. American Diamond Lines was not able to get Government subsidies post World War II and declined, closing in 1955 as part of Black Diamond Steamship.

== Black Diamond Steamship Company Ltd. ==
Black Diamond Steamship Company Ltd of Montreal was the Canadian subsidiary Black Diamond Steamship Company starting in 1926. The company began in 1881 and was owned by the Dominion Coal Company's Dominion Shipping Company Ltd., which was founded in 1893. Black Diamond Steamship Company Ltd and the Dominion Coal Company continued their partnership. In 1934 Dominion Shipping Co. Ltd. was taken over by Donaldson Bros. & Black Ltd., a British company, this control ended after World War 2. Black Diamond Steamship Company Ltd. closed in 1965, all ships being sold or scrapped due to age. N

== Ports of call ==
The first routes were Boston and New York to/from Antwerp, Rotterdam, and Amsterdam. Black Diamond Steamship Company had weekly routes to Charlottetown, Montreal, Sydney, and St. John's. It also served the cities of Philadelphia, Boston, Baltimore, and Norfolk / Newport News.

== Ships ==
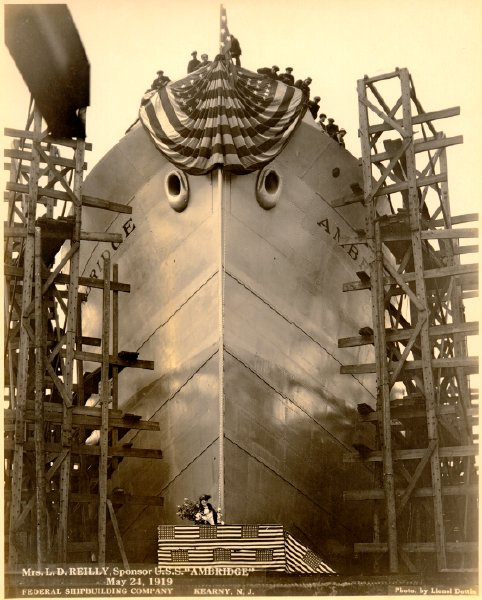
Launch of Ambridge in 1919 at Federal S.B. Yard at Kearney

Black Diamond Steamship and American Diamond Lines ships:

- New Britain (built in 1919, sank in 1942 as Silver Sword)
  - US Shipping Board ships:
- Anaconda, (built in 1919 at 380 tons, hull# 16, built at Federal Shipbuilding yard)
- Ambridge (Built in 1919 at Federal S.B. Yard)
- West Eldara
- Black Falcon (was Mary Luckenbach and USS Sac City)
- Black Gull (sank off Long Island after a fire on July 21, 1952, crew saved)
- Black Osprey (was West Arrow)
- Back Dragon (was Muncie Victory)
- Black Condor (was Empire Lapwing sank in 1941 as Belgian Fighter)
- Black Eagle (built 1920, sank in 1942 as Hoosier)
- Black Eagle (built 1945 as Midland Victory)
- Black Tern (then Empire Hawk)
- Black Heron (then Empire Barracuda)

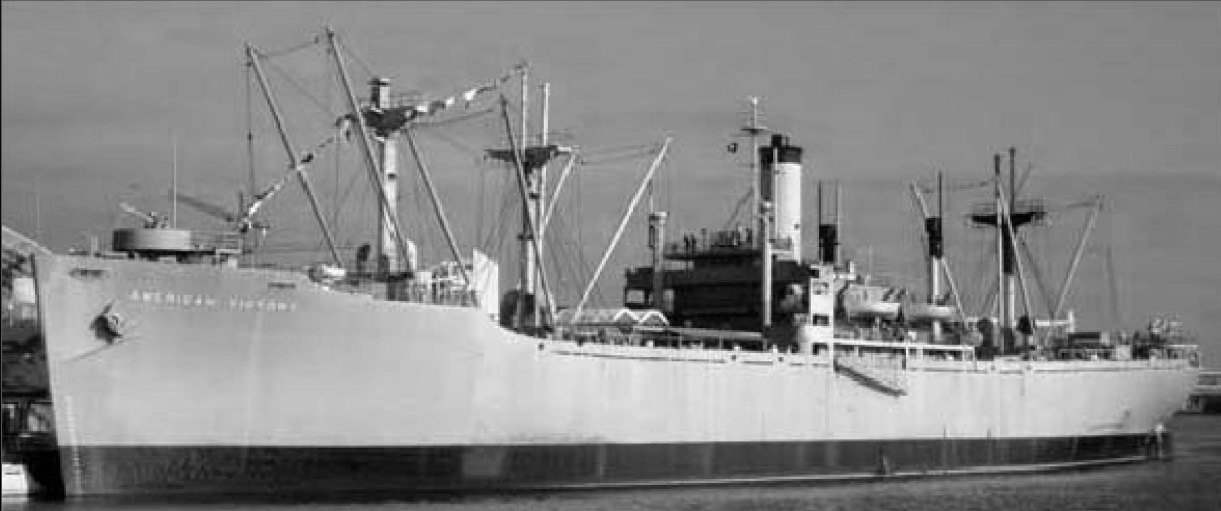
A VC2-S-AP2 type Victory ship

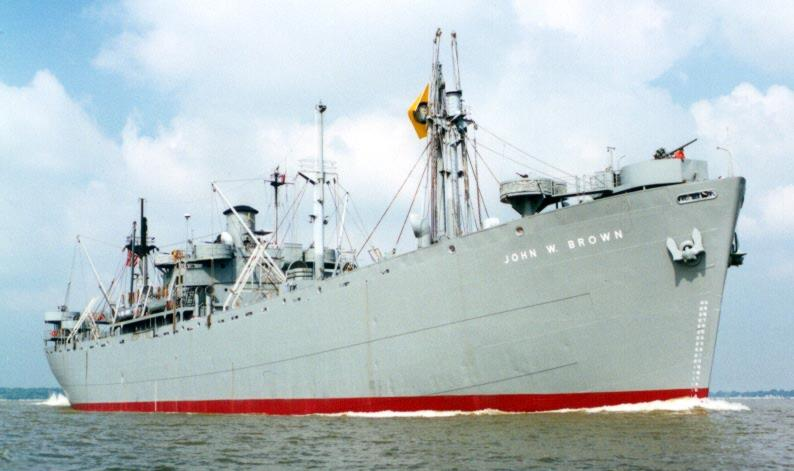
John W. Brown, one of four surviving Liberty ships in 2000

  - World War II chartered ships:
  - World War II Victory Ships:
- Union Victory
- Towanda Victory
- Hobart Victory
- Drake Victory
- Luray Victory
- North Platte Victory
- Coe Victory
  - World War II Liberty Ships:
- Kerkyra
- R. J. Reynolds
- Robert Dale Owen
- Robert Watchorn
- Patrick S. Mahoney
- Paul Hamilton
- Peregrine White
- James Sprunt
- Joe C. S. Blackburn
- John P. Harris
- William R. Lewis
- William F. Jerman
- William L. Watson
- Frank J. Cuhel
- Howard Gray
- Abram S. Hewitt
- Augustus Saint-Gaudens
- Morris C. Feinstone
