= HMS Coltsfoot =

History

United Kingdom
- Name: HMS Coltfoot
- Ordered: 25 July 1939
- Builder: Alexander Hall and Sons, Aberdeen
- Laid down: 4 September 1940
- Launched: 15 May 1941
- Completed: 1 Nov 1941
- Identification: Pennant number: K140

HMS Coltsfoot (K140) was a Flower-class corvette that served in the Royal Navy during the Second World War.

== Construction ==
The ship was ordered on 25 July 1939. She was laid down on 4 September 1940 and built at Alexander Hall and Sons in Aberdeen.

The ship was launched 15 May 1941 and commissioned into the Royal Navy on 1 Nov 1941.

== Career ==
From June 1941 until July 1943, her commander was William Keith Rous, 5th Earl of Stradbroke. In February 1942, during Warship Week, the ship was adopted by the town of Amesbury.

On 15 December 1941, she assisted the crew of the sunken ship SS Empire Barracuda after the Barracuda was torpedoed by the U-77 and sunk while on a voyage from Gibraltar to Cape Town and Suez. Ten crew members and three DEMS gunners were killed. The ship master, thirty six crew members and two gunners were rescued by the HMS Coltsfoot and arrived at Gibraltar.

In August 1942, the ship participated in Operation Pedestal, a British convoy to supply Malta. In the operation, she was assigned to Force R along with 3 other corvettes and a tug to protect the fleet oil tankers: RFA Brown Ranger and RFA Dingledale.

In 1943, the ship was part of the 39th escort group in the Battle of the Atlantic.

The ship was sold in 1947 and was turned into mercantile ship Alexandra.

== Honours ==
In February of 1942, as part of the Warship week campaign, the town of Amesbury raised money to adopt the corvette, which was successful with £52,100 being raised. There is a plaque commemorating the adoption in Amesbury.

The ship featured on a 2012 Maltese postal stamp.
