= Cosmopolitan Shipping Company =

Passengers and Shipping Company

- Industry: Shipping, Passenger
- Founded: 1916 in New York City, United States
- Defunct: 1982
- Area served: East Coast, France and South America.
- Key people: Granville Conway
- Subsidiaries: America-France Line and Southern Cross Line

Cosmopolitan Shipping Company, also called the Cosmopolitan Line, was founded in 1916 in New York City. Cosmopolitan Shipping Company operated cargo and passenger service from New York City to Le Havre France and Antwerp. From 1919 to 1939 operated United States Shipping Board ships under a United States contract, called the America-France Line. Later Cosmopolitan Shipping Company also operated the Southern Cross Line that served the east coast of South America. Southern Cross Line operated cargo ship with some passenger accommodations.

In 1939 Cosmopolitan Shipping Company lost the America-France Line contract to Southgate Nelson Corporation. Southgate Nelson Corporation operated the Oriole Line and Hampton Roads-Yankee Line. In 1939 Cosmopolitan Shipping Company lost the Southern Cross Line to Westfal-Larsen & Company. Westfal-Larsen & Company also operated the Interocean Line and County Line.

During World War II Cosmopolitan Shipping Company operated Merchant navy ships for the United States Shipping Board. During World War II Cosmopolitan Shipping Company was active with charter shipping with the Maritime Commission and War Shipping Administration. Cosmopolitan Shipping Company operated Liberty ships for the merchant navy. The ship was run by its Cosmopolitan Shipping Company crew and the US Navy supplied United States Navy Armed Guards to man the deck guns and radio.

Granville Conway (1898–1969) departed the War Shipping Administration to head the Cosmopolitan Shipping Company in 1947.

Post war Cosmopolitan Shipping Company chartered Norwegian ships, rather American. In 1982 Cosmopolitan Shipping Company exited the shipping market.

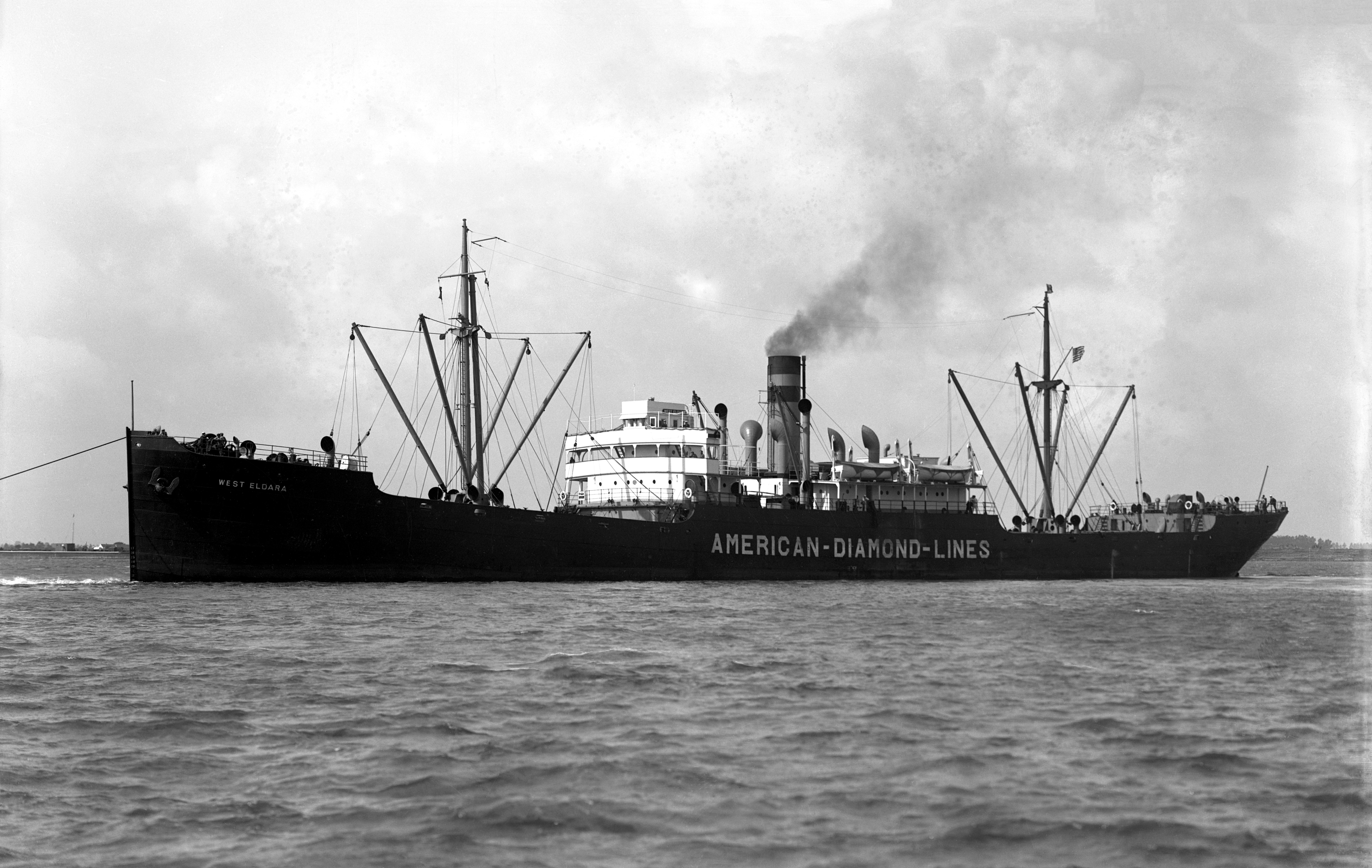
West Eldara

== Ships ==
- Ships:
  - Heron's Bridge, T2-SE-A1 tanker
  - Eastern Crag
  - Olen, sunk by torpedo in 1941
  - West Hematite, renamed Irish Pine, sunk by torpedo in 1942
  - West Eldara
  - West Arrow, later renamed Black Osprey, sunk by torpedo in 1941
  - Schodack, 1919 cargo, later renamed Alcoa Leader
  - Halma, sunk, presumed by a mine, off Nova Scotia, July 1943
  - Collamer, sunk by a U-boat in 1942
  - William W. McKee
- Norwegian ships:
  - Heina
  - Lista
  - Ronda
  - Hørda
- World War II ships:
  - Barren Hill T2 Tanker
  - Horace H. Lurton
  - Donald W. Bain
  - Hilary A. Herbert
  - Henry L. Benning
  - Frederick W. Wood
  - Wilson Victory
  - Thomas W. Murray
  - Edward B. Haines
  - Mary Lyon
  - John W. Powell
  - Robert Battey
- Junius Smith

== See also ==
- World War II United States Merchant Navy
