= Granville Conway =

Captain Granville Conway (1898–1969) was born in Cambridge, Maryland. Conway distinguished himself in maritime service and served in various positions during the Roosevelt and Truman administrations, including Shipping Advisor to both Presidents and the Joint Chiefs of Staff. He received the Medal for Merit in 1947. In his later years, Conway served as president of shipping companies.

== Early life ==
In 1906, his father, Captain Edward Conway, was injured, swept off his schooner, and lost in a storm near Baltimore, Maryland. The son graduated from the Government Navigation School in Baltimore and went to sea in 1918. Within four years thereafter he became master of his first ship, steamship Mojave, giving him the distinction of being one of the youngest masters of the entire American Merchant Marine. He was made a Captain of the Shipping Board's Reserve Fleet Division at Norfolk, Va, in 1922. The Captain served as manager for the Shipping Board in New London, Connecticut, and for the fleet of 135 laid-up vessels of World War I vintage – in Kill Van Kull, Staten Island. During this period, he outfitted and delivered ships for explorer Richard E. Byrd's trip to the North Pole in 1926 and the South Pole in 1933. In 1935, he became North Atlantic District Head of the Shipping Board, responsible for the Port of New York.

== World War II ==
He continued with the Maritime Commission and then in March 1944 as Deputy Administrator of the War Shipping Administration as first assistant to Admiral Emory S. Land. He was named head of the War Shipping Administration in 1946.

In World War II, the captain earned much of the credit for the speed achieved in transporting men and materiel to the European Theater of operations. He was entrepreneurial and inventive, shipping millions of tons of needed fuel for the allied war effort in ballast tanks and double bottoms otherwise meant for seawater to stabilize ships in bad weather, and to protect against mishaps. He conceived the idea of shipping fighter planes, bombers and all kinds of vital dry cargo on the decks of tankers by building spar decks over the oil piping, otherwise wasted space. For this accomplishment the Army Air Forces awarded Captain Conway its Certificate of Meritorious Service – the first time it had ever been given to a civilian. He always kept a letter from Winston Churchill under the glass of his desk; in it, that his idea to ship whole fighter planes on the decks of tankers would never work, but FDR supported Conway and it paid off big in the eventual victory.

Working as a volunteer during World War II, he managed the shipping of all Red Cross supplies to Europe (at no cost to the organization). He was responsible for secretly gathering the available ships from around the world to transport the men and machinery for the D-Day invasion.

After VE-Day and later, V-J Day, he led Operation Magic Carpet – the initiative to bring more than 7.6 million overseas service men home quickly on converted Liberty and Victory cargo ships as well as battleships, aircraft carriers, ocean liners and hospital ships. In addition, he transported almost half a million war brides as well as thousands of prisoners of war and displaced persons.

Throughout the war, Captain Conway was the Shipping Counselor at the White House and for the Joint Chiefs of Staff. In this capacity, he attended WWII Allied Conferences of the Heads of Government in Quebec, Yalta and Potsdam. On the occasion of National Maritime Day, May 22, 1946, Congressman Ellsworth Buck said on the floor of Congress, "It was men like Granville Conway who brought glory to the American merchant marine in the past. With the deserved support of the American people and the Congress, it is men like he who will bring glory to the American merchant marine in the future."

He resigned from the War Shipping Administration in the summer of 1947 to head the Cosmopolitan Shipping Company.

== Civilian life ==
At the request of President Harry S. Truman, he served from 1946 to 1948 as coordinator of the Emergency Export Program. As part of the United Nations Relief and Rehabilitation Administration (UNRRA), Conway was effectively the first Marshall Plan administrator. He shipped millions of tons of coal, grain, and relief supplies in the midst of one of Europe's worst winters and, in the words of Secretary of State Dean Acheson, "his actions prevented mass starvation in many areas and certainly enhanced our position as a great humanitarian nation."

In 1947, he was asked by President Truman to serve on a committee of 19 private citizens headed by W. Averell Harriman, Secretary of Commerce. The Harriman Committee analyzed the aid needs for Europe and made the specific policy recommendations which became the Marshall Plan. Captain Conway headed the Transportation Committee.

From 1948 to 1950, he also served as Director of the Transportation Office of the National Security Resources Board responsible for developing a mobilization plan for international control and operation of the fleets of all the North Atlantic Pact nations in the event of war. The plan covered rolling stock as well as other transport needs.

In 1956, at the request of the Grace National Bank and the U.S. Department of Justice, he became President of Victory Carriers, Inc. and United States Petroleum Carriers, Inc. These companies owned and controlled the U.S. shipping interests of Aristotle Onassis, in trust for his two American-born children, Alexander and Christina. Under the settlement terms of a questionable criminal and civil suit brought by the United States for the "illegal" purchase by an alien of U.S. World War II ships, Onassis was required to transfer full operating control and ownership of his fleet to U.S. citizens.

At the time of Captain Conway's death in September 1969, he was President of the Cosmopolitan Shipping Company and the Home Lines Agency and Chairman of Commercial Tankers of Liberia. Cosmopolitan owned and operated oil tankers and were agents for a number of steamship companies, including the passenger ship owner and operator, Home Lines.

== Decorations ==
In addition to his Merchant Marine, World War I, and World War II decorations, he was awarded the Order of Olav, Knight 1st Class by the Norwegian Government, the Officer, Legion of Honour from France, the Officer, Order of Leopold (Belgium) (military division), the Commander of Orange Nassau from the Netherlands, the Commander of the Most Excellent Order of the British Empire and the Medal for Merit from the U.S. President.

The Medal for Merit, the highest ranking civilian award at the time of war, was signed by President Truman on July 16, 1947, and awarded on his behalf by Conway's good friend, Navy Under Secretary W. John Kenney in a ceremony at the Navy Building in Washington, D.C., on November 3, 1947. The Citation which accompanied the Medal for Merit stated:

GRANVILLE CONWAY, for exceptionally meritorious Conduct in the performance of outstanding services to the United States throughout the period of the recent war. Mr. Conway, who served successively as Atlantic Coast Director, Deputy Administrator, and Administrator of the United States War Shipping Administration, and as Special Expert and Special Assistant to the United States Maritime Commission, as Shipping Advisor to the President at the Yalta Conference and to the Joint Chiefs of Staff at the Quebec Conference, was singularly outstanding in the accomplishment of the movement of millions of tons of military cargo and millions of military personnel in vessels of the Merchant Marine. His sound judgment in cooperation with the Army and Navy Transportation services in the Allocation of available ocean shipping to the multitude of tasks facing the country both for military purposes and for the war-making capacity of the United States will always stand out in transportation history. Further, his knowledge of merchant ship capabilities and characteristics, ship operations and shipping control proved invaluable in the successful accomplishment of ocean transportation. He also rendered immeasurable assistance in the expeditious demobilization of the Army and Navy by promptly making ships available for an enormous troop lift in all theaters, thus utilizing all merchant ships to the maximum of their capabilities. In these accomplishments, Mr. Conway contributed to a most successful and outstanding transportation operation with a spirit of loyalty which is in keeping with the highest traditions of American citizenship.

HARRY S. TRUMAN

THE WHITE HOUSE

July 16, 1947.
