= SS Junius Smith =

Liberty ship of WWII

History

United States
- Name: Junius Smith
- Namesake: Junius Smith
- Owner: War Shipping Administration (WSA)
- Operator: Cosmopolitan Shipping Company
- Ordered: as type (EC2-S-C1) hull, MC hull 2505
- Awarded: 23 April 1943
- Builder: St. Johns River Shipbuilding Company, Jacksonville, Florida
- Cost: $964,440
- Yard number: 69
- Way number: 3
- Laid down: 11 October 1944
- Launched: 14 November 1944
- Sponsored by: Mrs. Henry A. Davis, Jr.
- Completed: 22 November 1944
- Identification: Call sign: KYUT
- Fate: Laid up in the National Defense Reserve Fleet, Beaumont, Texas, 14 April 1949; Sold for scrapping, 30 November 1965, withdrawn from fleet, 14 January 1966

General characteristics
- Class & type: Liberty ship; type EC2-S-C1, standard
- Tonnage: 10,865 LT DWT; 7,176 GRT
- Displacement: 3,380 long tons (3,434 t) (light); 14,245 long tons (14,474 t) (max)
- Length: 441 feet 6 inches (135 m) oa; 416 feet (127 m) pp; 427 feet (130 m) lwl
- Beam: 57 feet (17 m)
- Draft: 27 ft 9.25 in (8.4646 m)
- Installed power: 2 × Oil fired 450 °F (232 °C) boilers, operating at 220 psi (1,500 kPa); 2,500 hp (1,900 kW)
- Propulsion: 1 × triple-expansion steam engine, (manufactured by General Machinery Corp., Hamilton, Ohio); 1 × screw propeller
- Speed: 11.5 knots (21.3 km/h; 13.2 mph)
- Capacity: 562,608 cubic feet (15,931 m^{3}) (grain); 499,573 cubic feet (14,146 m^{3}) (bale)
- Complement: 38–62 USMM; 21–40 USNAG
- Armament: Varied by ship; Bow-mounted 3-inch (76 mm)/50-caliber gun; Stern-mounted 4-inch (102 mm)/50-caliber gun; 2–8 × single 20-millimeter (0.79 in) Oerlikon anti-aircraft (AA) cannons and/or, 2–8 × 37-millimeter (1.46 in) M1 AA guns

SS Junius Smith was a Liberty ship built in the United States during World War II. She was named after Junius Smith, an American lawyer that founded the British and American Steam Navigation Company, who is often considered the "Father of the Atlantic Liner".

== Construction ==
Junius Smith was laid down on 11 October 1944, under a Maritime Commission (MARCOM) contract, MC hull 2505, by the St. Johns River Shipbuilding Company, Jacksonville, Florida; she was sponsored by Mrs. Henry A. Davis Jr., the wife of the foreman of railroad transportation at St. Johns River SBC, and was launched on 14 November 1944.

== History ==
She was allocated to the Cosmopolitan Shipping Company, on 22 November 1944. On 14 April 1949, she was laid up in the National Defense Reserve Fleet, Beaumont, Texas. She was sold for scrapping, 30 November 1965, to Southern Scrap Material Co., Ltd., for $48,929.79. She was removed from the fleet, 14 January 1966.

== Bibliography ==
- "St. John's River Shipbuilding, Jacksonville FL". www.ShipbuildingHistory.com. 16 October 2010.
- Maritime Administration. "Junius Smith". Ship History Database Vessel Status Card. U.S. Department of Transportation, Maritime Administration.
- Davies, James (May 2004). "Specifications (As-Built)" (PDF). p. 23.
- "SS Junius Smith".
