= SS Howard Gray =

World War II Liberty ship of the United States

History

United States
- Name: Howard Gray
- Namesake: Howard Gray
- Owner: War Shipping Administration (WSA)
- Operator: Black Diamond Steamship Co.
- Ordered: as type (EC2-S-C1) hull, MC hull 2302
- Builder: J.A. Jones Construction, Panama City, Florida
- Cost: $998,910
- Yard number: 43
- Way number: 3
- Laid down: 6 April 1944
- Launched: 18 May 1944
- Sponsored by: Mrs. Celeste Taylor
- Completed: 7 June 1944
- Identification: Call Signal: WPCH
- Fate: Transferred to Italy for commercial use, 28 May 1947

Italy
- Name: Italico
- Owner: Marino Querci, Genoa, Italy
- Acquired: 28 May 1947
- Fate: Sold, 1959; Scrapped, 1969

General characteristics
- Class & type: Liberty ship; type EC2-S-C1, standard
- Tonnage: 10,865 LT DWT; 7,176 GRT
- Displacement: 3,380 long tons (3,434 t) (light); 14,245 long tons (14,474 t) (max)
- Length: 441 feet 6 inches (135 m) oa; 416 feet (127 m) pp; 427 feet (130 m) lwl
- Beam: 57 feet (17 m)
- Draft: 27 ft 9.25 in (8.4646 m)
- Installed power: 2 × Oil fired 450 °F (232 °C) boilers, operating at 220 psi (1,500 kPa); 2,500 hp (1,900 kW)
- Propulsion: 1 × triple-expansion steam engine, (manufactured by General Machinery Corp., Hamilton, Ohio); 1 × screw propeller
- Speed: 11.5 knots (21.3 km/h; 13.2 mph)
- Capacity: 562,608 cubic feet (15,931 m^{3}) (grain); 499,573 cubic feet (14,146 m^{3}) (bale)
- Complement: 38–62 USMM; 21–40 USNAG
- Armament: Varied by ship; Bow-mounted 3-inch (76 mm)/50-caliber gun; Stern-mounted 4-inch (102 mm)/50-caliber gun; 2–8 × single 20-millimeter (0.79 in) Oerlikon anti-aircraft (AA) cannons and/or, 2–8 × 37-millimeter (1.46 in) M1 AA guns

SS Howard Gray was a Liberty ship built in the United States during World War II. She was named after Howard Gray, an official with the Public Works Administration that was also active in the Alabama 4-H Club.

== Construction ==
Howard Gray was laid down on 6 April 1944, under a Maritime Commission (MARCOM) contract, MC hull 2302, by J.A. Jones Construction, Panama City, Florida; she was sponsored by Mrs. Celeste Taylor, and launched on 18 May 1944.

== History ==
She was allocated to Black Diamond Steamship Company, on 7 June 1944. On 20 April 1946, she was laid up in the National Defense Reserve Fleet, in the Hudson River Group. On 16 December 1946, she was relocated to the National Defense Reserve Fleet, in Wilmington, North Carolina. On 28 May 1947, she was transferred to the Italian Government, which in turn sold her to Marino Querci, Genoa, Italy, for commercial use. She was renamed Italico. She was first resold in 1959, and went through a couple of owners before being scrapped in Shanghai in 1969.

== Bibliography ==
- "Jones Construction, Panama City FL". www.ShipbuildingHistory.com. 13 October 2010.
- "Liberty Ships – World War II".
- Maritime Administration. "Howard Gray". Ship History Database Vessel Status Card. U.S. Department of Transportation, Maritime Administration. Archived from the original on 12 December 2019.
- Davies, James (May 2004). "Specifications (As-Built)" (PDF). p. 23.
- "SS Howard Gray".
