= SS Empire Barracuda =

US-built cargo steamship that was sunk in 1942

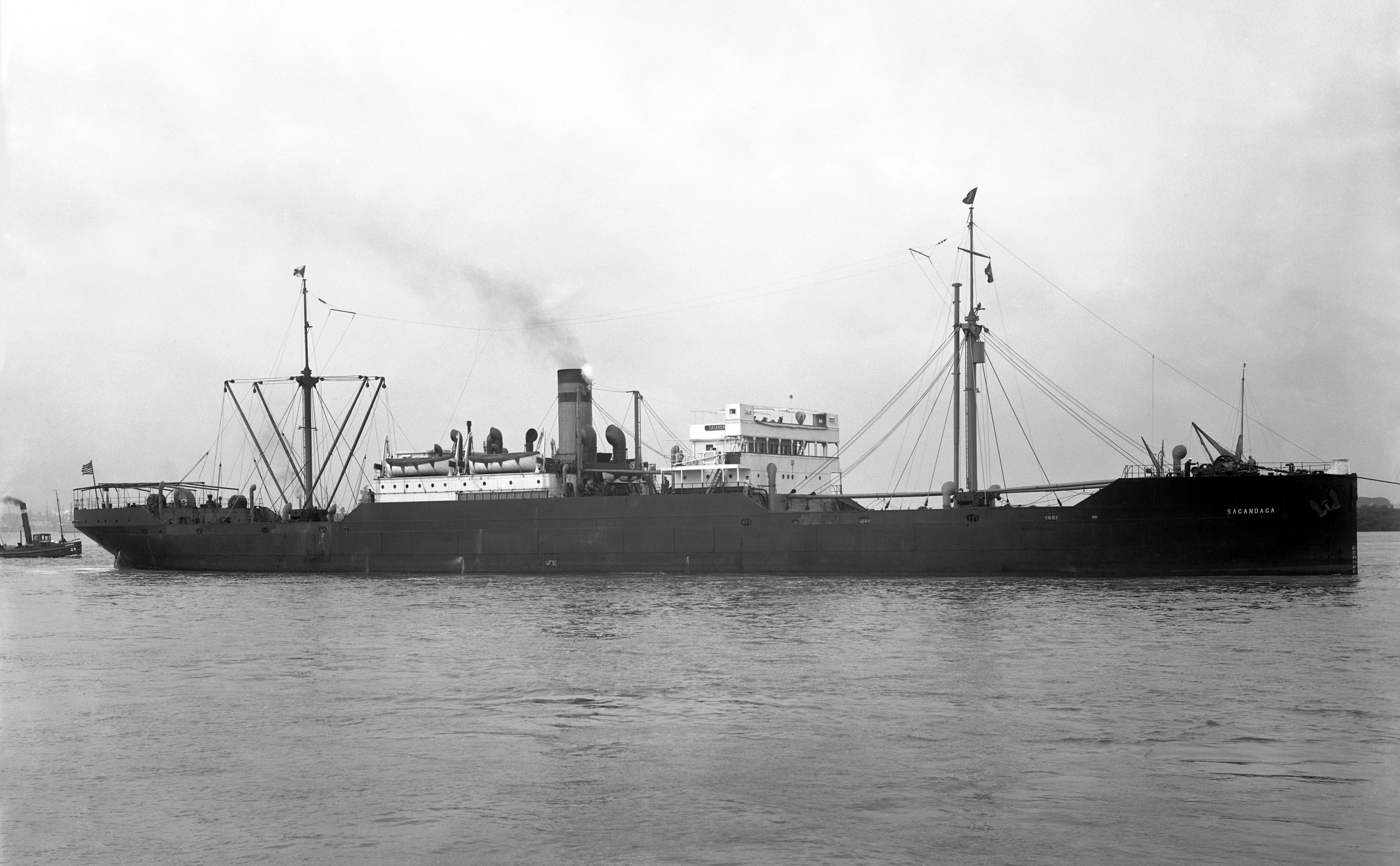
- Sacandaga in Antwerp in the 1920s or early 1930s

History
- Name: 1918: Sacandaga; 1933: Black Heron; 1941: Empire Barracuda
- Namesake: 1918: Sacandaga River; 1932: black heron; 1941: barracuda
- Owner: 1919: United States Shipping Board; 1931: American Diamond Lines; 1938: Black Diamond Lines; 1940: Ministry of Shipping; 1941: Ministry of War Transport
- Operator: 1919: Emergency Fleet Corporation; 1926: American Diamond Lines; 1938: Black Diamond Lines; 1939: States Marine Corporation; 1940: Cunard-White Star Line
- Port of registry: 1919: (United States) Philadelphia; 1932: (United States) New York; 1941: (United Kingdom) London
- Builder: American International Shipbuilding Co, Hog Island, Pennsylvania
- Yard number: 494
- Laid down: 20 March 1918
- Launched: 29 October 1918
- Completed: 12 January 1919
- Refit: 1932
- Identification: US official number 217429; 1919: code letters LPKQ; by 1934: call sign KESC; 1941: UK official number 168073; 1941: call sign GNPP
- Fate: sunk by torpedo, 1942

General characteristics
- Class & type: Design 1022 cargo steamship
- Tonnage: 5,735 GRT, 3,445 NRT, 7,500 DWT
- Length: 390.0 ft (118.9 m)
- Beam: 54.2 ft (16.5 m)
- Depth: 27.6 ft (8.4 m)
- Decks: 2
- Installed power: 1 × steam turbine + reduction gearing; 600 NHP; 2,500 ihp
- Propulsion: 1 × screw
- Speed: 12 knots (22 km/h)
- Crew: 1942: 47, + 5 DEMS gunners
- Sensors & processing systems: by 1926: submarine signalling; by 1934: echo sounding device; by 1936: wireless direction finding
- Armament: 1942: 1 × 4-inch or 4.7-inch naval gun; 8 × machine guns

SS Empire Barracuda was a Design 1022 cargo steamship. She was built in 1919 for the United States Shipping Board (USSB) as Sacandaga. American Diamond Lines was operating her by 1926; and in 1931 bought her and renamed her Black Heron. In 1941 the United Kingdom Ministry of Shipping bought her, and renamed her Empire Barracuda. In 1942, a German U-boat sank her by torpedo, killing 13 of the people aboard her.

== Sacandaga ==
The American International Shipbuilding Co of Hog Island, Philadelphia built the ship for the USSB as yard number 494. She was laid down on 20 March 1918; launched on 20 October 1918; and completed on 12 January 1919. Her registered length was 390.0 ft (118.9 m); her beam was 54.2 ft (16.5 m); and her depth was 27.6 ft (8.4 m). Her tonnages were 5,735 GRT; 3,445 NRT; and about 7,500 DWT. She had a single screw, driven by a General Electric steam turbine via double reduction gearing. She had three water-tube boilers, and their furnaces were fuelled with heavy fuel oil. Her turbine was rated at 600 NHP or 2,500 ihp, and gave her a speed of 12 knots (22 km/h). The USSB registered Sacandaga at Philadelphia. Her US official number was 217429, and her code letters were LPKQ.

By 1926, Sacandaga was equipped with submarine signalling, and she was one of seven USSB ships that American Diamond Lines was using on its transatlantic cargo service to Antwerp in Belgium. The company was also running eight USSB ships on its transatlantic route to Rotterdam in the Netherlands. In March 1926, the United States Postmaster General awarded American Diamond Lines a contract to carry mail on both routes.

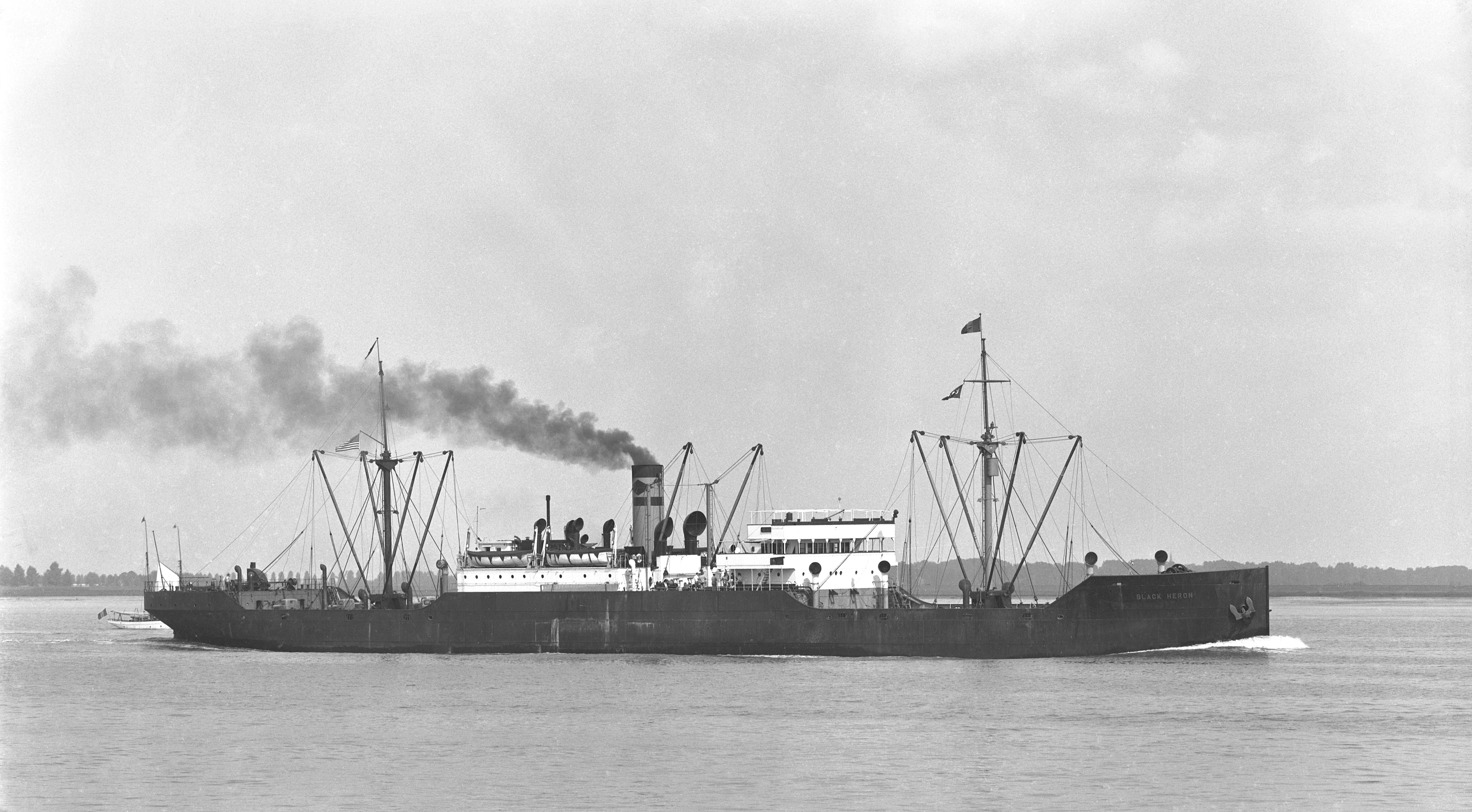
Black Heron in the 1930s, probably in the Scheldt

== Black Heron ==
In 1931, American Diamond Lines bought six USSB ships, including Sacandaga, for its transatlantic cargo service. Her new owner registered her in New York. In 1932, the Federal Shipbuilding and Drydock Company refitted her in Kearny, New Jersey, and she was renamed Black Heron.

By 1934, Black Heron was equipped with an echo sounding device. Also by 1934, her wireless telegraph call sign was KESC, and this had superseded her code letters. By 1935, she was equipped with wireless direction finding.

In 1937 or '38, the company renamed itself Black Diamond Lines. By 1939, its ships operated from Weehawken, New Jersey. Black Heron operated between Baltimore, Boston, Newport News, New York, and Norfolk in the United States; and Antwerp, Amsterdam, and Rotterdam in the Low Countries.

=== Second World War ===
In November 1939, the US government imposed a "Neutrality Zone" around parts of Europe, which stopped Black Diamond Line from using US-registered ships for its transatlantic cargo services. By 14 December that year, it had chartered all but one of its fleet to other operators. The States Marine Corporation chartered Black Heron to trade between the Far East and ports in the Gulf of Mexico.

In November 1940, Black Diamond applied to the United States Maritime Commission (USMC) for permission to sell eight of its ships to UK shipping interests. It was reported that Cunard-White Star Line sought to buy Black Heron and one of her sister ships, Black Tern. In fact, it may have been that the UK Ministry of Shipping sought to buy the ships, and place them under Cunard-White Star management. On 3 December, the USMC agreed to the sale of only four of the eight Black Diamond ships: Black Heron and Back Tern, which Cunard-White Star would manage; and Black Condor and Black Osprey, which Cairn Line of Newcastle upon Tyne would manage.

=== Fire in Brooklyn ===
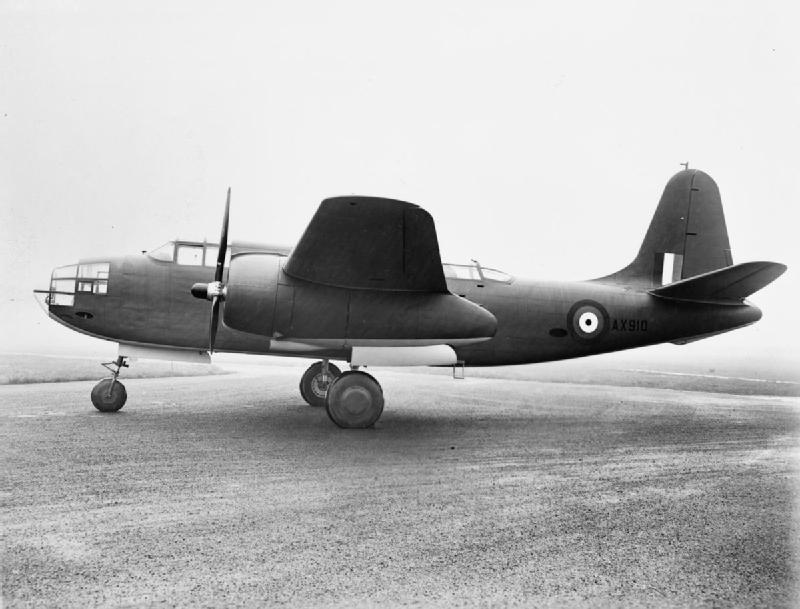
An RAF Douglas A-20 Havoc

Black Heron loaded a mixed cargo in New York: mattresses, blankets, used clothing, children's sleeping garments, layettes, air raid shelter kits, medical supplies, and food for the American Red Cross; similar items from the British War Relief Society; but also materiel including aircraft parts, and three Douglas bombers as deck cargo. The Douglas bombers may have been A-20 Havocs; which France had ordered; but which the UK bought after France capitulated in June 1940, and renamed the "Boston".

On 10 January 1941, Black Heron was moored on the south side of Pier 8 at the foot of Pineapple Street, Brooklyn. She had completed loading, her cargo, apart from 300 tons of steel. A welder was welding steel shackles to her deck to secure one of the Douglas aircraft, which was on the hatch cover of her number 3 hold. At about 17:30 hrs, his welding torch burnt a small hole in the deck, and he smelt burning in the hole below. He raised the alarm, but a cargo fire developed in the hold. Black Heron's Second Officer alerted a police officer on the pier, who called the New York City Fire Department.

Two fireboats fought the fire; aided by the United States Coast Guard Cutter Hudson. The hatch to number 3 hold could not be opened; because of the bomber secured to it; so firefighters broke a hole in the deck. A Merritt-Chapman & Scott vessel equipped with a derrick stood by, ready to lift the bombers off the ship if necessary. New York City Police Department emergency squads and detectives, and a squad of FBI investigators, also attended the fire and its aftermath. New York Mayor La Guardia came to observe the operation. The fire was put out after an hour, and the bombers were undamaged, but caused damage estimated at $150,000 to the aid supplies. A hearing the next day confirmed that the cause of the fire was entirely accidental, and there were no suspicious circumstances.

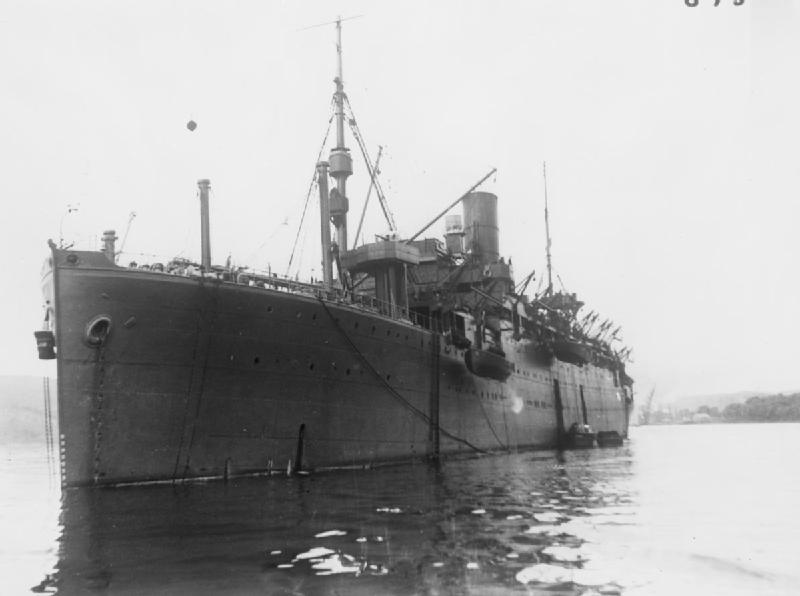
HMS Ascania was an escort of convoys HX 105 and HX 140

The ship's sailing was not delayed. She sailed to Halifax, Nova Scotia, where she joined Convoy HX 105. The convoy's escorts included the armed merchant cruiser HMS Ascania, which was a converted Cunard liner. HX 105 left Halifax on 25 January 1941, and reached Liverpool safely on 9 February.

== Empire Barracuda ==
By March 1941, Black Heron had been renamed Empire Barracuda. She was registered in London; Her UK official number was 168073; and her call sign was GNPP.

On 12 March 1941, Empire Barracuda left Liverpool. She sailed with Convoy OB 297, which dispersed at sea on 17 March. She continued to Corpus Christi, Texas, where she loaded scrap iron. She returned via Halifax, where she joined Convoy HX 125B. This convoy had no escorts, but sustained no losses, and Empire Barracuda safely reached Loch Ewe on 22 May. She continued around the north coast of Scotland to the Firth of Forth, where she called at Grangemouth and Leith, and then on 12 June anchored in Methil Roads.

On 18 June 1941, the ship left Loch Ewe. She reached New York on 3 July, and loaded steel. She returned via Halifax, where she joined Convoy HX 140. This convoy's escorts also included HMS Ascania. HX 140 sustained no losses to enemy action, and Empire Barracuda reached Loch Ewe on 6 August. She continued via Methil Roads to Middlesbrough, where she arrived n 10 August.

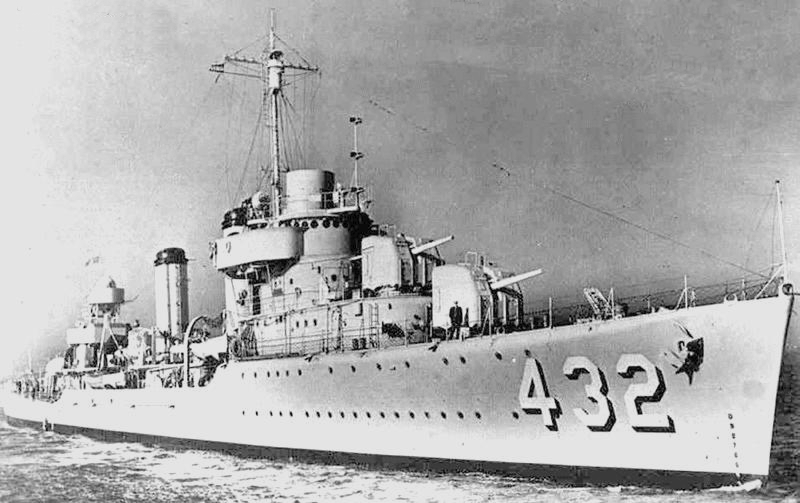
USS Kearny was one of the US Navy escorts of Convoy HX 151

On 22 August 1941, the ship left Loch Ewe. She joined Convoy ON 9, which had left Liverpool on 20 August, and dispersed at sea on 25 August. She reached New York on 3 September 1941, where she loaded steel. She returned via Halifax, where she joined Convoy HX 151. On this return voyage she carried three passengers. The USA was still neutral at that time, but four United States Navy destroyers formed part of the convoy's escort for one week of the voyage. Empire Barracuda reached the Firth of Clyde on 5 October. On 10 October she anchored at Tail of the Bank, and then called at Greenock.

From 10 October, Empire Barracuda was in Glasgow, loading stores destined for Gibraltar. By that time, her defensive armament was one 4-inch or 4.7-inch naval gun, and eight machine guns. On 4 November she moved to Tail of the Bank, and then to an anchorage in the Firth of Clyde. On 7 November she joined Convoy OS 11, which had started from Liverpool, and was bound for Freetown, Sierra Leone. In due course, she and another cargo ship, Empire Panther, detached from OS 11 and safely reached Gibraltar. Empire Panther was another former USSB cargo ship.

=== Loss ===
Approximate position off Morocco where Empire Barracuda was sunk.

In December 1941, Empire Barracuda and Empire Panther left Gibraltar, escorted by the corvette HMS Coltsfoot. Empire Barracuda's cargo was 5,800 tons of naval and military stores, including munitions, and she was bound for Suez in Egypt via South Africa. Her Master was Captain Frederick Ridley. Her complement was 52 men, including five DEMS gunners.

On 15 December, U-77 attacked the small convoy. She reported hitting a cargo ship with one torpedo at 04:10 hrs; a tanker at 04:30 hrs; and that both ships were sinking. Empire Barracuda sank at position 35°30′N 6°17′W, and ten members of her crew and three of her gunners were killed. HMS Coltsfoot rescued 39 survivors, and landed them at Gibraltar. Those killed aboard Empire Barracuda are commemorated in the Second World War section of Tower Hill Memorial, London.

== Bibliography ==
- Bureau of Navigation (1919). Fifty-First Annual List of Merchant Vessels of the United States (PDF). Washington, DC: Government Printing Office – via HyperWar.
- Bureau of Navigation (1932). Merchant Vessels of the United States (PDF). Washington, DC: Government Printing Office – via HyperWar.
- Bureau of Navigation (1933). Merchant Vessels of the United States (PDF). Washington, DC: Government Printing Office – via HyperWar.
- Lloyd's Register of Shipping. Vol. II.–Steamers. London: Lloyd's Register of Shipping. 1919 – via Internet Archive.
- Lloyd's Register of Shipping. Vol. II.–Steamers and Motorships. London: Lloyd's Register of Shipping. 1926 – via Internet Archive.
- Lloyd's Register of Shipping (PDF). Vol. II.–Steamers and Motorships of 300 Tons Gross and Over. London: Lloyd's Register of Shipping. 1931 – via Southampton City Council.
- Lloyd's Register of Shipping (PDF). Vol. II.–Steamers and Motorships of 300 Tons Gross and Over. London: Lloyd's Register of Shipping. 1932 – via Southampton City Council.
- Lloyd's Register of Shipping (PDF). Vol. II.–Steamers and Motorships of 300 Tons Gross and Over. London: Lloyd's Register of Shipping. 1933 – via Southampton City Council.
- Lloyd's Register of Shipping (PDF). Vol. II.–Steamers and Motorships of 300 Tons Gross and Over. London: Lloyd's Register of Shipping. 1934 – via Southampton City Council.
- Lloyd's Register of Shipping (PDF). Vol. II.–Steamers and Motorships of 300 Tons Gross and Over. London: Lloyd's Register of Shipping. 1935 – via Southampton City Council.
- Lloyd's Register of Shipping (PDF). Vol. II.–Steamers and Motorships of 300 Tons Gross and Over. London: Lloyd's Register of Shipping. 1937 – via Southampton City Council.
- Lloyd's Register of Shipping (PDF). Vol. I.–Steamers and Motorships of 300 Tons. Trawlers, Tugs, Dredgers, etc. London: Lloyd's Register of Shipping. 1940 – via Southampton City Council.
- Lloyd's Register of Shipping (PDF). Vol. II.–Steamers and Motorships of 300 Tons Gross and Over. London: Lloyd's Register of Shipping. 1941 – via Southampton City Council.
- Mitchell, WH; Sawyer, LA (1995). The Empire Ships. London, New York, Hamburg, Hong Kong: Lloyd's of London Press. p. 414. ISBN 1-85044-275-4.
