= SS Empire Banner =

World War II merchant ship of the United Kingdom

History
- Name: Empire Banner
- Owner: Ministry of War Transport
- Operator: W T Gould Ltd, Cardiff
- Port of registry: (United Kingdom) Sunderland
- Builder: Bartram & Sons Ltd, Sunderland.
- Yard number: 286
- Launched: 29 June 1942
- Completed: September 1942
- Identification: Official Number 169028; Code Letters BCXC
- Fate: Torpedoed on 7 February 1943 and sunk

General characteristics
- Tonnage: 6,699 GRT
- Length: 416 ft 8 in (127.00 m)
- Beam: 56 ft 6 in (17.22 m)
- Depth: 34 ft (10.36 m)
- Propulsion: 1 x triple expansion steam engine (North East Marine Engine Co (1938) Ltd, Sunderland) 511 hp (381 kW)
- Complement: 47, plus 15 DEMS gunners

Location of the sinking of Empire Banner.

Empire Banner was a 6,699 GRT cargo ship which was built by Bartram & Sons Ltd, Sunderland in 1942 for the Ministry of War Transport (MoWT). She was torpedoed by U-77 on 7 February 1943 and sunk later that day by enemy aircraft.

== History ==
Empire Banner was built by Bartram & Sons Ltd, Sunderland as yard number 286. She was launched on 29 June 1942 and completed in September 1942. She was built for the MoWT and was operated under the management of W T Gould & Co Ltd, Cardiff.

Empire Banner was a member of a number of convoys during the Second World War.

MKS 3X

Convoy MKS 3X sailed from Bône, Algeria on 3 December 1942 and arrived at Liverpool on 19 December. Empire Banner joined the convoy at Algiers She was fitted with anti-torpedo nets although these were reported as being broken on departure from Algiers.

KMS 8G

Convoy KMS 8G which departed the Clyde on 21 January 1943. Empire Banner was carrying 3,800 tons of military supplies, including tanks and other transport. She had departed from Penarth and was destined for Bône. On 7 February 1943, she was torpedoed by U-77 at 02:00 hours. Her position was 36°48′N 01°32′E. Empire Banner headed for Oran but at 06:00 she was finished off by an enemy aircraft. All 47 crew, 15 DEMS gunners and 10 soldier passengers were rescued by HMCS Camrose and landed at Algiers.

== Official number and code letters ==
Official Numbers were a forerunner to IMO Numbers.

Empire Banner had the UK Official Number 169083 and used the Code Letters BCXC.
