= SV Toufic El Rahman =

History
- Name: Toufic El Rahman
- Port of registry: (Syria)
- Fate: Sunk, 24 July 1942

General characteristics
- Type: Sailing ship
- Tonnage: 30 GRT
- Propulsion: Sails

SV Toufic El Rahman was a Syrian sailing ship that was sunk by the German submarine U-77, 30 nautical miles (56 km) east of Cape Greco, Crete in the Mediterranean Sea, while en route to Haifa.

== Sinking ==
Toufic El Rahman was en route to Haifa. On 24 July 1942 at 18:17, she was stopped by a warning shot of the German submarine U-77 30 nautical miles (56 km) east of Cape Greco, Crete in the Mediterranean Sea and later sunk with 25 rounds from the U-boat's deck gun after the crew had abandoned ship. All of the crew survived.
