= SS West Eldara =

American cargo ship

Coordinates: 8°3′N 58°13′W

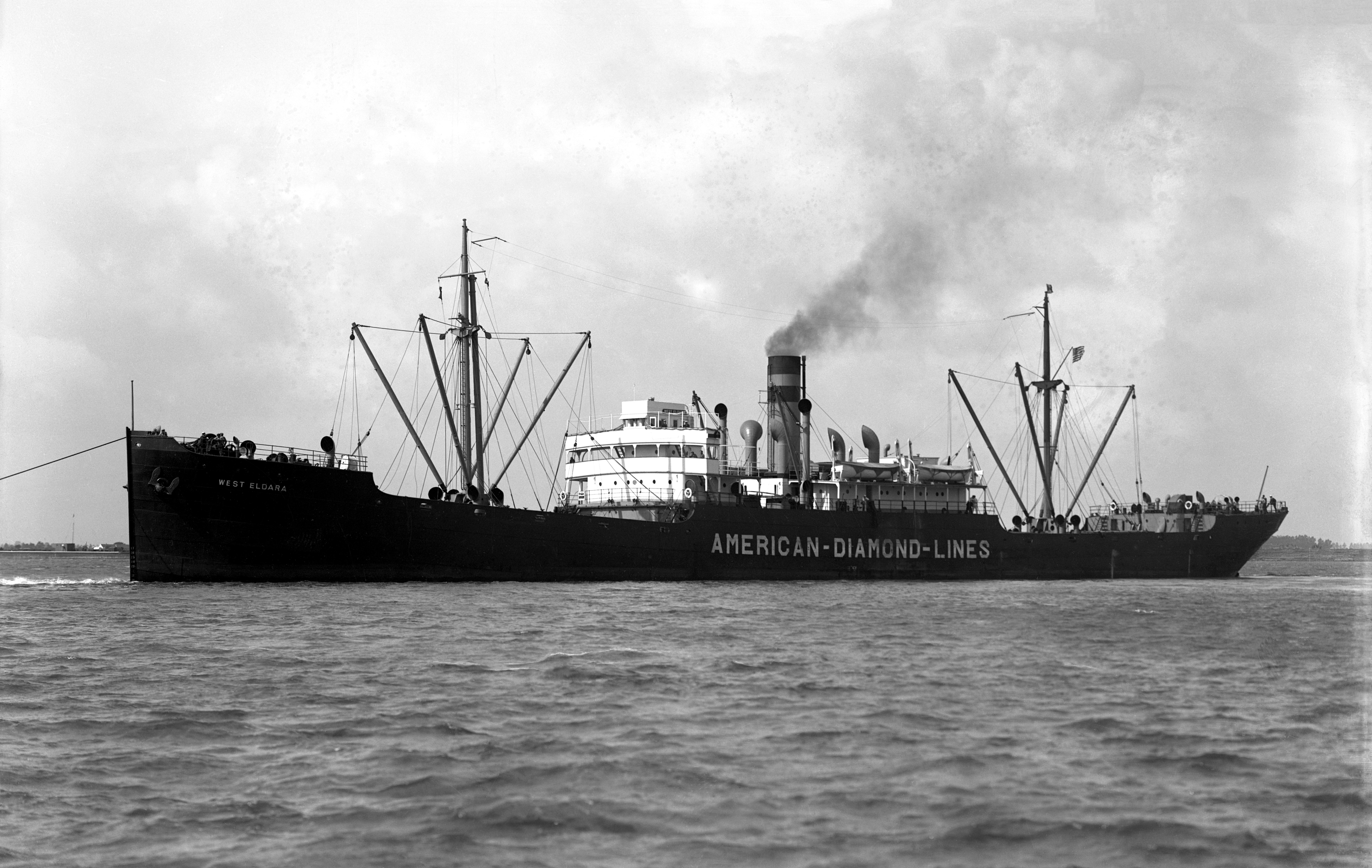
- West Eldara on the river Scheldt

History
- Name: SS West Eldara
- Owner: U.S. Shipping Board
- Builder: Skinner & Eddy
- Yard number: 39 (USSB #1938)
- Launched: 14 October 1918
- Commissioned: 23 Nov 18–4 Jun 19
- In service: 23 Nov 18–16 Sep 42
- Renamed: 1918: USS West Eldara; 1919: West Eldara; 1936: Mae
- Fate: Sunk, 17 September 1942

General characteristics
- Type: Design #1013 cargo ship
- Tonnage: 6,087 gross, 8,800 dwt
- Displacement: 12,225 tons
- Length: 423 ft 9 in (129.16 m); 410 ft 5 in (125.10 m) bp
- Beam: 54 ft (16 m)
- Draft: 24 ft 2 in (7.37 m)
- Depth of hold: 29 ft 9 in (9.07 m)
- Installed power: 1 × Curtis geared turbine
- Propulsion: Single screw
- Speed: 11.5 kn (21.3 km/h)
- Complement: WWI (USN): 84; Peacetime: about 30; WWII: 41 (32 crew, 9 gunners)
- Armament: WWII: 1 × 4", 2 × .30 cal. MG

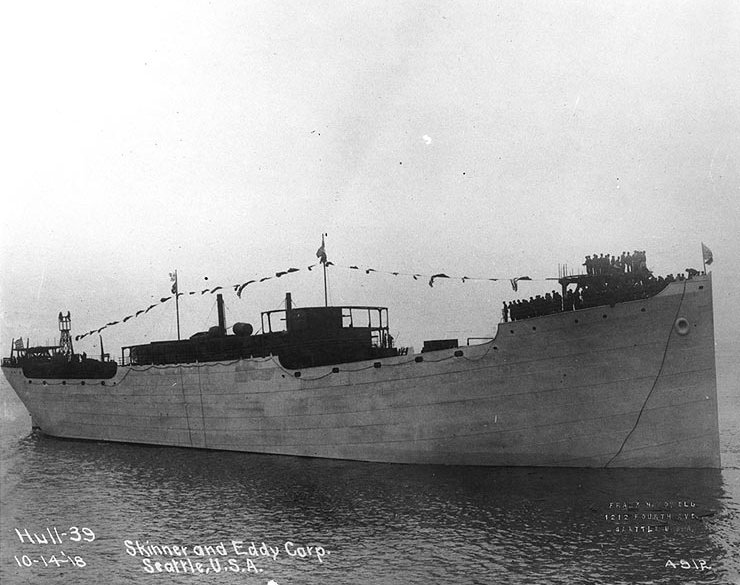
West Eldara immediately after launch and prior to the completion of her superstructure, 14 October 1918

SS West Eldara was a steel-hulled cargo ship built in 1918 as part of the United States Shipping Board's emergency World War I shipbuilding program.

West Eldara briefly served with the U.S. Navy in the immediate postwar period as the auxiliary ship USS West Eldara (ID-3704), completing two relief missions to Europe before decommissioning. Between the wars, West Eldara operated as a merchant ship in transatlantic service. In 1936 she was renamed SS Mae.

In September 1942 Mae was intercepted by German submarine U-515 off British Guiana and sunk with torpedoes and gunfire.

== Design and construction ==
West Eldara was built in Seattle, Washington in 1918 at the No. 2 Plant of the Skinner & Eddy Corporation—the last in a series of 24 Design 1013 cargo ships built by Skinner & Eddy for the USSB's emergency wartime shipbuilding program.

West Eldara had a design deadweight tonnage of 8,800 tons and gross register tonnage of 5,600. She had an overall length of 423 feet 9 inches, a beam of 54 feet and a draft of 24 feet 2 inches. The ship was powered by a Curtis geared turbine, driving a single screw propeller and delivering a speed of 11.5 knots.

== Service history ==
=== U.S. Navy service, 1918–1919 ===
West Eldara was launched on 14 October 1918, and completed over the next few weeks. Delivered just too late to see service in the war, she was commissioned into the Navy on 23 November at the Puget Sound Navy Yard for operation with the Naval Overseas Transportation Service (NOTS) as USS West Eldara (ID-3704).

West Eldara sailed on 8 December for San Francisco, California, entering the Mare Island Navy Yard six days later for repairs to her steering gear. Four days after Christmas, the ship got underway from the west coast, bound via the Panama Canal for New York City, where she arrived on 14 January 1919. With a cargo of flour and lard, West Eldara departed for Europe on the 24th. Upon her arrival at Gibraltar, the ship was routed on to the Near East, and on 12 February, headed for Constantinople, arriving on the 22nd.

After discharging her cargo, West Eldara returned via Gibraltar to the United States, arriving at New York on 7 April. On 16 April the ship departed NY with a cargo of Army supplies destined for Antwerp and Plymouth, England. The vessel departed the British Isles on 12 May bound once more for New York, where she arrived on the 29th. On 4 June, West Eldara was decommissioned and returned the same day to the stewardship of the USSB.

=== Merchant service ===
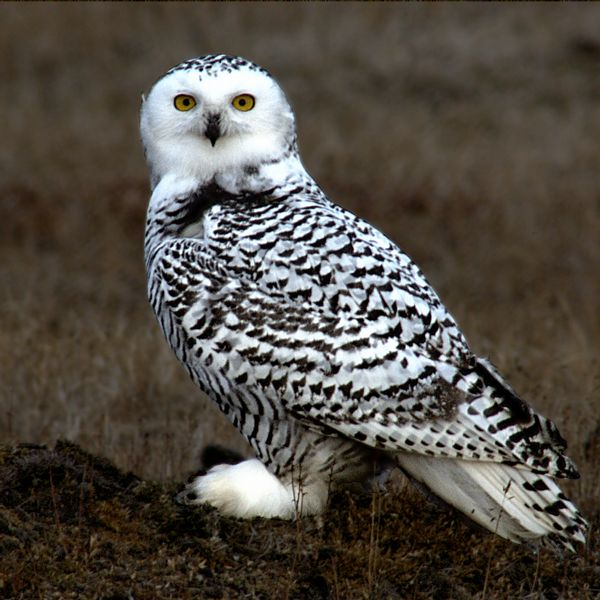
In 1926, an arctic owl was found in West Eldara's icebox.

Following her decommission from the Navy, the USSB placed the vessel into merchant service as SS West Eldara. In May 1920, West Eldara ran aground off Honolulu while transporting a cargo of peanuts from Yokohama, Japan to Savannah, Georgia, as a result of which the peanuts were not delivered until March 1921. The Southern Cotton Oil Company subsequently sued the USSB for $198,000 for damages. The claim was dismissed in 1936.

Through the mid-1920s, West Eldara seems to have been engaged mostly in transporting cargo and sometimes passengers between the United States and various European destinations. Repeat ports of call for the ship in this period included Bordeaux, Le Havre and Dunkirk, France; Rotterdam in the Netherlands and Liverpool, England. The ship also made several voyages to Seattle on the west coast of the U.S. and at least one voyage to the Philippines.

In 1926, customs officials in the United States searching West Eldara for contraband made the unlikely discovery in the ship's icebox of an arctic owl. By 1928, the ship was sailing under the flag of the American Diamond Lines (later known as the Black Diamond Line). In July of that year, West Eldara's Second Assistant Engineer was arrested in the United States in connection with the shooting death aboard ship of another crew member at Antwerp. The accused pleaded self-defence and was later cleared by a Grand Jury.

In 1933, West Eldara participated in two rescue missions at sea. In February, she was the first ship to come to the aid of the fishing trawler Newton, which had been gutted by a fire at sea off the coast of Boston. West Eldara stood by until a Coast Guard cutter, Mojave, arrived on the scene to tow the stricken vessel to safety. Most of Newton's crew of fourteen were rescued, but a search for two crew members who had earlier taken to one of the lifeboats was later called off. The second incident occurred in November, when the British freighter Saxilby foundered off the coast of Ireland during a storm. West Eldara was one of five vessels which raced to the scene, but a search in stormy seas the following day failed to find any trace of Saxilby's 27 crew.

In 1936, West Eldara was sold to A. H. Bull & Company, who renamed the ship SS Mae and homeported her in New York. The ship was still operating under that name when the U.S. entered World War II in December 1941.

==== Loss ====
After America's entry into the war, SS Mae continued to operate independently. On 17 September 1942, Mae was proceeding unescorted from Trinidad to Georgetown, British Guiana when at 06:25 she was struck by a torpedo from U-515 about 45 miles north of the Georgetown Beacon. The crew abandoned ship in three lifeboats over the next ten minutes, but Mae remained afloat so U-515 surfaced and sank the ship at 07:50 with 16 shells fired from a distance of 200 yards, killing one of the ship's crew in the process.

The rest of the ship's personnel, including 32 officers and crew and nine gunners, were rescued six hours later by the Norwegian steamer Sørvangen and later transferred to the British steamer Gypsum King, who took the wounded by Motor Launch to Georgetown and landed the rest some time later.

A ship portrait of West Eldara was painted in 1924 by Victor Edouard Charles Adam ("V. Adam 1924") for the ship's then-master, William A. Reed. Her funnel is shown in the colors of the Cosmopolitan Shipping Company of Brooklyn, N.Y., which was at that time leasing her from the USSB. The portrait is currently (2023) owned by a resident of Kings County, New Brunswick, Canada.

== Bibliography ==
- Silverstone, Paul H. (2006): The New Navy, 1883–1922, Routledge, ISBN 978-0-415-97871-2.
