= SS Black Osprey =

US-built cargo steamship that was sunk in 1941

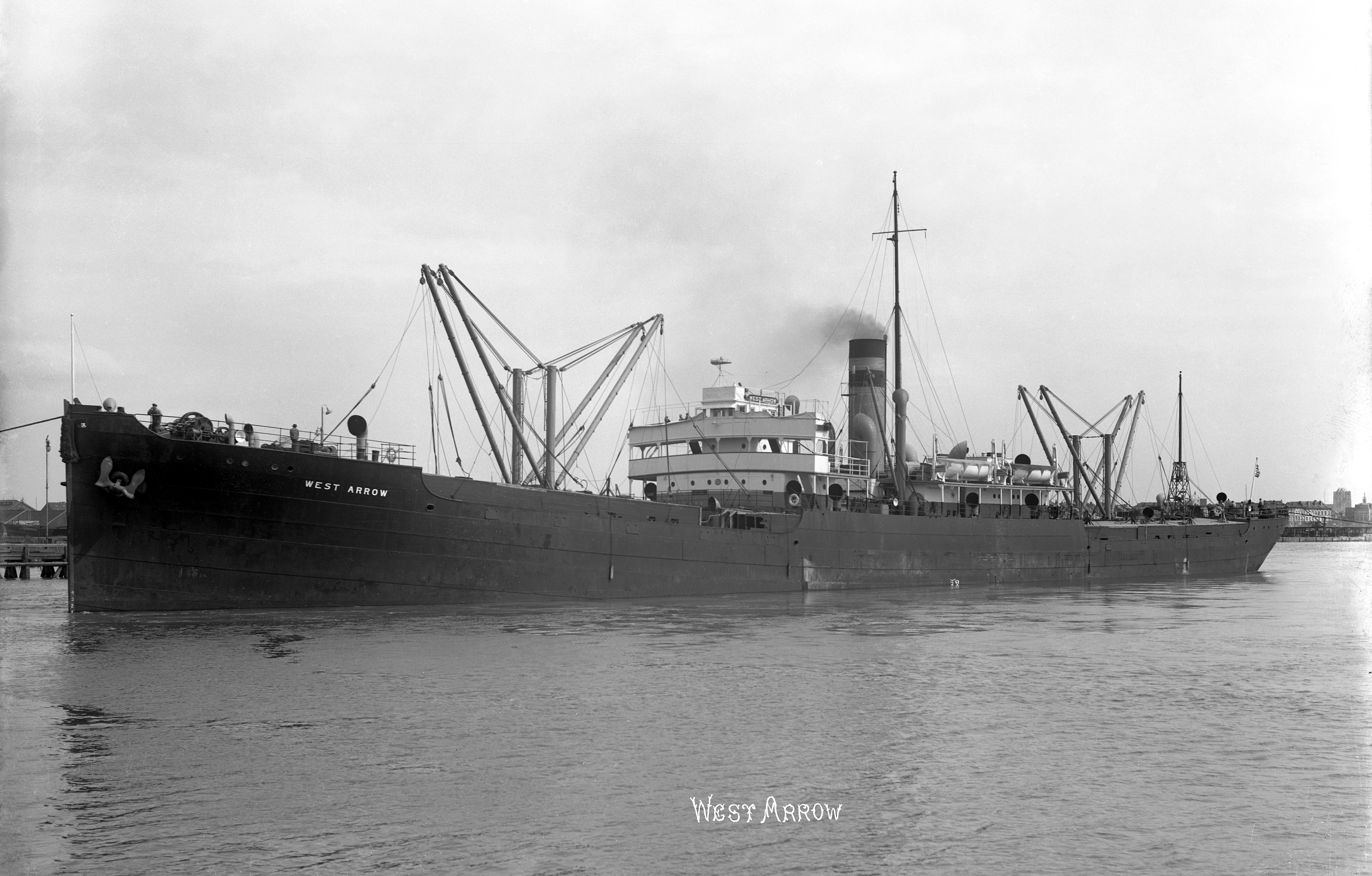
- West Arrow in the late 1920s or early 1930s, with one mast amidships

History
- Name: 1917: Jas. G. Eddy; 1918: West Arrow; 1935: Black Osprey
- Owner: 1918: US Shipping Board; 1931: American Diamond Lines; 1938: Black Diamond Lines; 1940: Ministry of Shipping
- Operator: 1921: AH Bull Steamship Co; 1921: Export Transportation Co; 1926: American Diamond Lines; 1939: States Marine Corporation; 1940: Cairn Line
- Port of registry: 1919: (United States) Seattle; 1932: (United States) New York; 1941: (United Kingdom) London
- Route: 1921: Baltimore – Liverpool; 1926: New York – Antwerp
- Builder: Skinner & Eddy, Seattle
- Yard number: 12
- Laid down: 20 September 1917
- Launched: 19 January 1918
- Completed: 26 February 1918
- Refit: 1932
- Identification: US official number 216012; 1919: code letters LJRP; by 1934: call sign WCDH
- Fate: sunk by torpedo, 1941

General characteristics
- Class & type: Design 1013 cargo ship
- Tonnage: 5,852 GRT, 4,436 NRT, 8,800 DWT
- Length: 409.6 ft (124.8 m)
- Beam: 54.1 ft (16.5 m)
- Depth: 27.1 ft (8.3 m)
- Decks: 2
- Installed power: 1 × steam turbine + reduction gearing; 508 NHP; 2,500 ihp
- Propulsion: 1 × screw
- Speed: 10 1/2 knots (19 km/h)
- Sensors & processing systems: by 1921: submarine signalling; by 1936: wireless direction finding
- Armament: 1941: 2 × machine guns

SS Black Osprey was a Design 1013 cargo steamship that was built in the First World War for the United States Shipping Board (USSB). She was laid down in 1917 as Jas. G. Eddy, but launched in 1918 as West Arrow. By 1926, American Diamond Lines was operating her on its transatlantic cargo service to Belgium. American Diamond Lines bought her in 1931, and renamed her Black Osprey in 1935. In 1940 the United Kingdom Ministry of Shipping bought her. In 1941, a German U-boat sank her by torpedo.

West Arrow was one of the "West" boats; a series of cargo steamships built on the West Coast of the United States for the Emergency Fleet Corporation. The United States Navy inspected her for possible use as a naval cargo ship. She was assigned the Naval Registry Identification Number ID-2585, but was never requisitioned or commissioned. Although built as a cargo ship, she carried US troops; both to France during the First World War, and home again after the Armistice with Germany.

In 1920–21, the A. H. Bull Steamship Company used West Arrow to take dairy cows from the US as post-war aid to Germany. In 1921–22, the Export Transportation Co used her on a regular cargo route between Baltimore and Liverpool. In 1926, American Diamond Lines started using her on its route between New York and Antwerp.

By 1938, American Diamond Lines had become Black Diamond Lines. Early in the Second World War, the UK twice detained Black Osprey for inspection. By that November, the US had imposed a "Neutrality Zone", which stopped Black Diamond Lines from using US-registered ships on its routes to Belgium and the Netherlands. The company chartered foreign ships to continue that service; and other shipping companies chartered Black Diamond's fleet for use elsewhere. The States Marine Corporation chartered Black Osprey, and ran her between the Gulf of Mexico and the Far East.

In December 1940, the UK Ministry of Shipping bought Black Osprey and registered her in Britain. In February 1941, on her first voyage in UK ownership, U-96 sank her in the North Atlantic, killing 25 members of her crew. A Norwegian cargo ship rescued 11 survivors, and landed them in Wales.

== Building ==
The West ships were cargo ships of similar size and design, built by several shipyards on the West Coast of the United States for the USSB for emergency use in the First World War. All were given names that began with the word West. West Arrow was one of 24 West ships built by Skinner & Eddy in Seattle, which was an emergency shipyard that operated from 1916 until about 1920. She was built as yard number 12, and laid down on 20 September 1917 as Jas G. Eddy. However, she was launched on 19 January 1918 as West Arrow, to fit the "West boat" naming policy. She was completed on 26 February that year.

Her length (between perpendiculars was 409.6 ft (124.8 m); her beam was 54.1 ft (16.5 m); and her depth was 27.1 ft (8.3 m). Her tonnages were 5,852 GRT; 4,436 NRT; and 8,800 DWT. She had single screw, driven by a steam turbine via double-reduction gearing. She had three single-ended boilers, each with three corrugated furnaces; and they were equipped to burn heavy fuel oil. Her turbine was rated at 508 NHP or 2,500 ihp, and gave her a speed of 10 1/2 knots (19 km/h).

== West Arrow ==
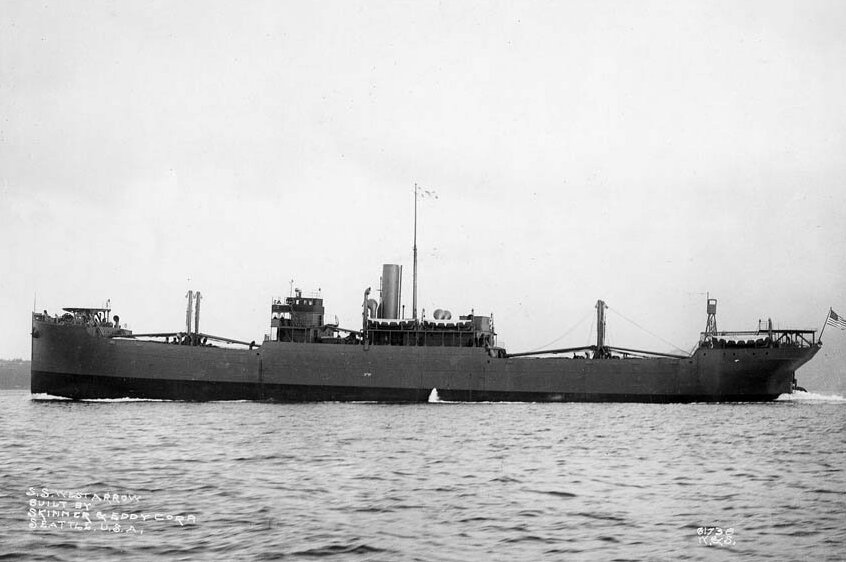
West Arrow under way in ballast in 1918

The USSB registered West Arrow at Seattle. Her US official number was 216012, and her code letters were LJRP. The 13th Naval District of the United States Navy inspected her after completion, and assigned her the Naval Registry Identification Number 2585. Had she been commissioned, she would have been USS West Arrow (ID-2585). However, the Navy neither requisitioned nor commissioned her.

On 1 March 1918, West Arrow arrived in Tacoma. Little is recorded of her First World War service. She was defensively armed; had US Navy gunners; and her second officer was in the US Navy Reserve. Although purely a cargo ship, she was used to carry US troops. By September 1918, she had taken troops to France.

On 1 December 1918, after the Armistice with Germany, West Arrow arrived in La Pallice, France. On 20 December she left France for Newport News, apparently repatriating US troops. In 1919 she repatriated casual troops, leaving Le Havre on 11 March, and due in New York on the 28th. On 1 April, she left Norfolk for Newport News. On 11 May she reached Gibraltar, whence she continued to Constantinople (now Istanbul). She left Constantinople on 12 June, and on 1 July reached New York. On 15 July 1919, West Arrow reached Newport News, where she was to load cattle for France. However, she was delayed there by a seamen's strike. West Arrow left La Pallice on 8 September 1919, and reached Norfolk on 25 September. On 9 January 1920, she left Newport News for New York. On 29 January, she left New York for La Pallice. She left La Pallice on 23 February; reached New York on 11 March; and continued to Norfolk and Newport News.

West Arrow made at least two further transatlantic crossings in 1920. In March, she sailed from Norfolk, via Boston, to Antwerp in Belgium, which she reached on 25 April. She left Antwerp on 9 May; and returned via New York to Philadelphia, where she arrived on 6 June. On 10 June, she sailed from Philadelphia via Boston to Gothenburg, which she reached on 10 July. She left Gothenburg on 17 July; called at London, England; and reached New York on 12 August.

== Cows for Germany ==
Later in 1920, West Arrow was chartered to take 750 Holstein "milch cows" from Texas to Germany, as part of a shipment of 100,000 cattle to replenish the dairy herds of Germany and Austria. The American Dairy Cattle Company oversaw the shipment. Many of the cattle, and their fodder for the voyage, were gifts from US farmers. She left New York on 5 November 1920 for Galveston, where she arrived on the 16th. She was refitted to carry livestock, and in January 1921 she embarked 742 Holsteins. She left Galveston; and called at Norfolk and Newport News. She carried 30 farm hands from Kansas, Texas, and Indiana to look after the cattle. On the voyage, seven cows died, and 40 calves were born. On 7 February she docked in Bremen, where she landed the surviving cattle. The cattle were to be distributed under the direction of the "German committee on foreign relief" and the German Red Cross. Immediately after unloading her cattle, West Arrow began bunkering to sail for the Azores.

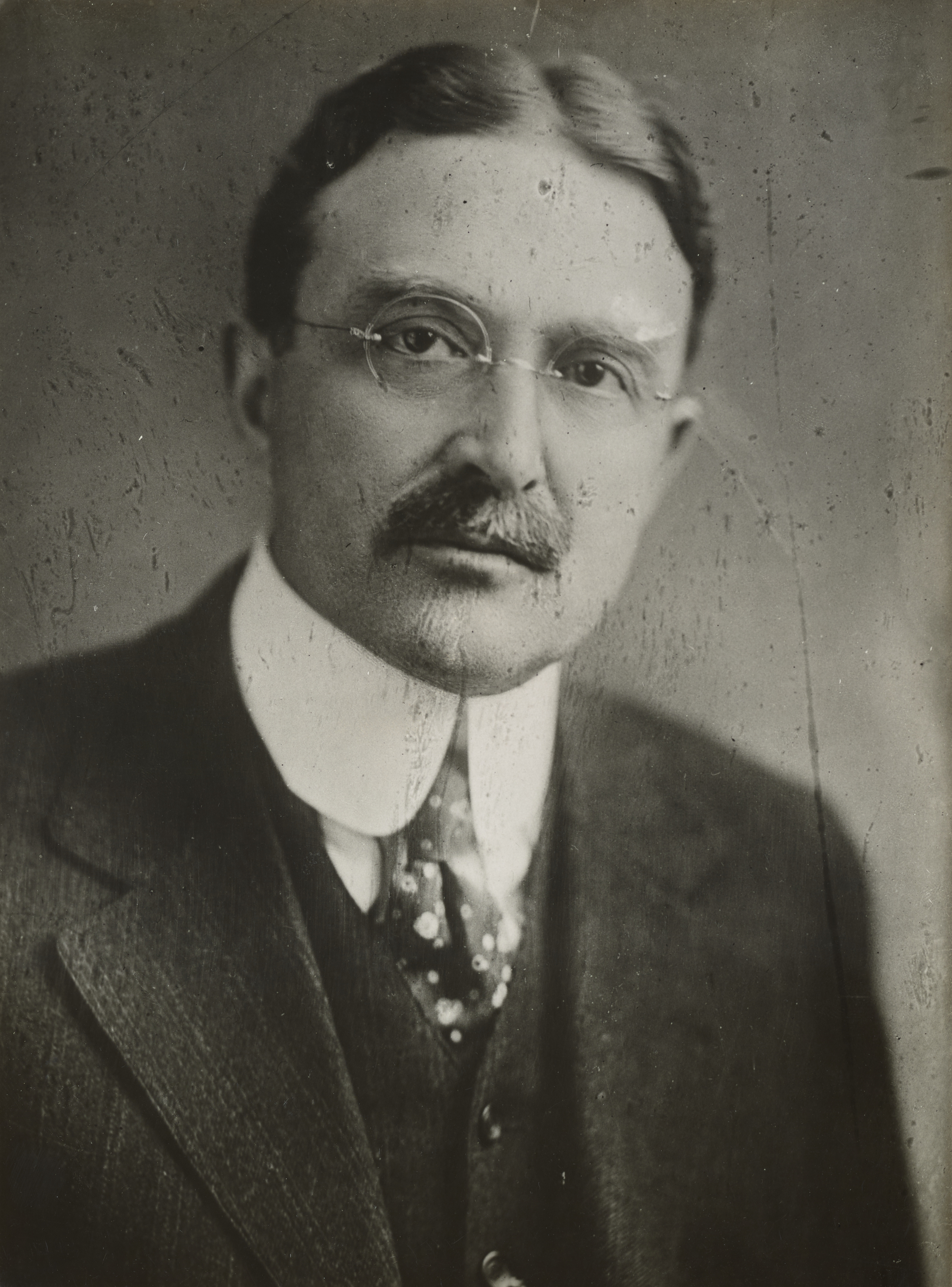
Professor Alonzo E. Taylor

In March 1921, West Arrow returned to the US embark a second shipment of cows for Germany. Some members of the American Legion in Maryland, led by General Charles F Macklin, objected. The ship called at Jacksonville, Brunswick, and Norfolk. On 4 April, 744 milch cows and three pedigree bulls reached a Baltimore stockyard by railroad from South Dakota to await West Arrow. By this stage, it was reported that the A. H. Bull Steamship Company was managing the ship. A week later, she reached the Port of Baltimore. By then, the American Legion was not alone in opposing sending cows from the US to Germany. Professor Alonzo E. Taylor, head of research for the American Relief Administration, reported from Berlin that Germany had about eight million cows; but enough fodder for only about six million; and hence their milk yield was below normal. He said "Every additional cow is an embarrassment," and "Those desiring to aid Germany's milk production should contribute oilcake and other concentrated feed", and not cows.

On 14 April, West Arrow left Locust Point, Baltimore; and on 3 May, she reached Bremen, carrying 718 cows and 70 calves. She continued to Hamburg, where she arrived on 16 May. Her return voyage was to Norfolk, where she arrived on 4 June. From there she sailed to Newport News, where she arrived on 16 June.

== Export Transportation Co ==
By 1 July 1921, West Arrow was equipped with submarine signalling. On 28 October that year, she reached Baltimore from Newport News. On 31 October, the Emergency Fleet Corporation announced that it had assigned West Arrow to be managed by the Export Transportation Co. She began a regular route between Chesapeake Bay and Liverpool, usually via Boston. She left Norfolk for Liverpool on 8 November, and briefly called in Boston on 11–12 November. She returned via Boston, and reached Baltimore on 23 December. She continued on the route throughout 1922. She left Baltimore on 7 January, was in Liverpool from 4 to 9 February, and arrived back in Baltimore on 3 March. She was in Liverpool again in late May, and again during the first week of July. On the latter voyage, she returned to Baltimore via Philadelphia. She was in Liverpool again in late August. On her next voyage; which left Baltimore on 25 October; she called at both Philadelphia and New York, before reaching Liverpool on 15 November. She returned via Boston.

== Collision with Haverford ==
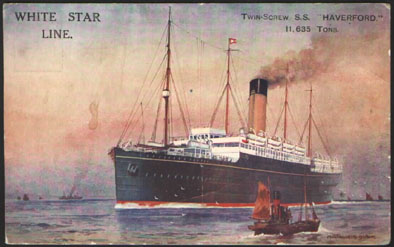
A postcard of Haverford

By contrast with previous years, records of West Arrow's movements in 1923, 1924, and 1925 are scant. However, early in August 1923 she sailed from Chesapeake Bay. At about 12:20 hrs on 19 September 1923; in the North Atlantic at position 50°16′N 32°49′W, she was under way from Liverpool to Boston when the White Star Liner Haverford struck her port bow, about 10 feet (3 m) from her stem. West Arrow signalled by wireless telegraph that she was continuing under her own power, and not taking on water.

== American Diamond Lines ==
By early 1926, West Arrow was one of seven USSB ships that American Diamond Lines was using on its transatlantic cargo service between New York and Antwerp. The company was also running eight USSB ships on its transatlantic route to Rotterdam in the Netherlands. In March 1926, the United States Postmaster General awarded American Diamond Lines a contract to carry mail on both routes. In July 1932, she was transferred to a new Baltimore – Antwerp route, but by December 1934 she was back on the route to Rotterdam.

== Black Osprey ==
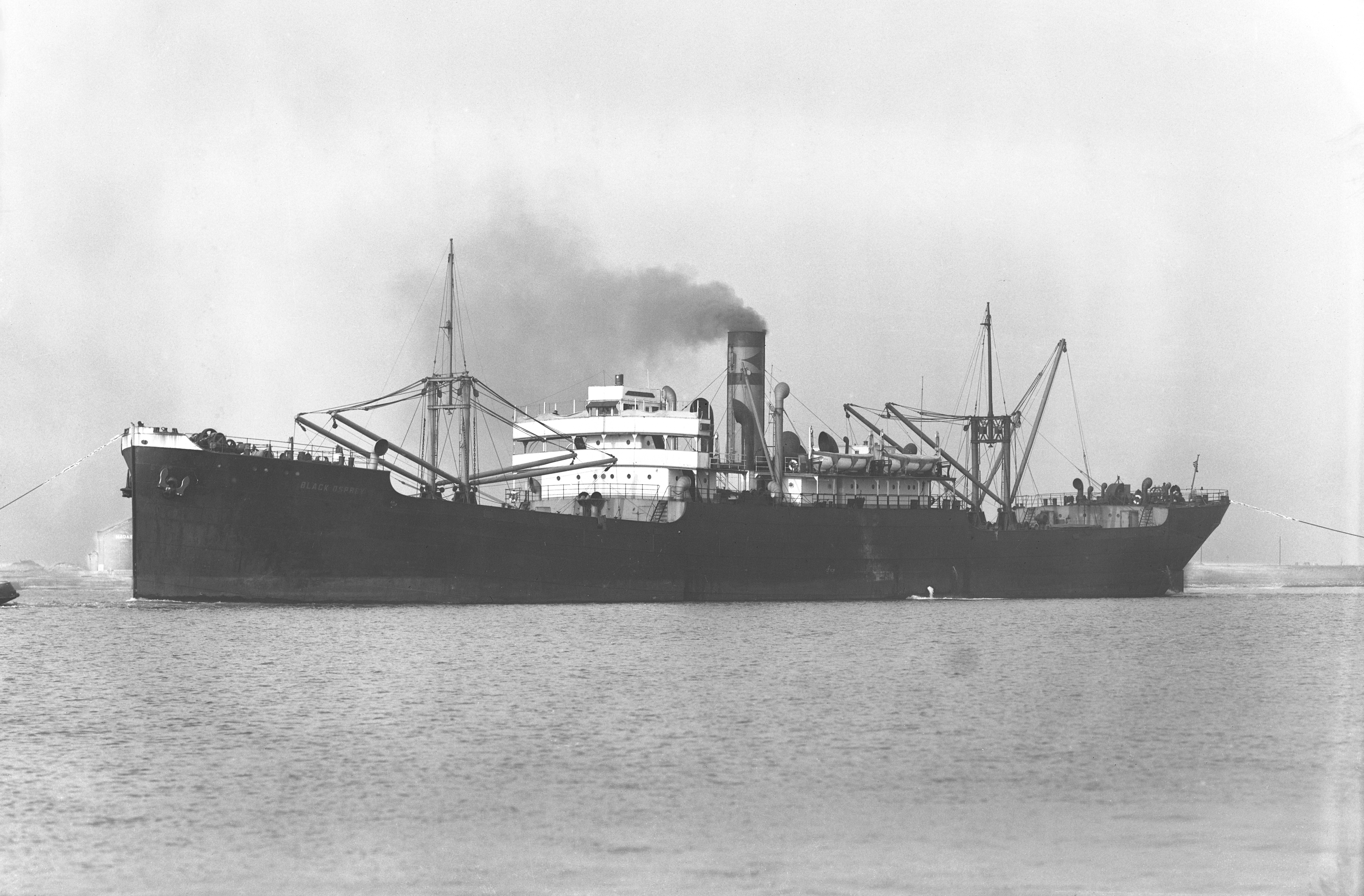
Black Osprey in the latter half of the 1930s, after her original mast amidships was removed, and two new masts were added fore and aft, above her pairs of samson posts

In 1932, American Diamond Lines bought West Arrow from the USSB, and registered her in New York. By 1934, her call sign was WCDH, and this had superseded her code letters. In 1935, she was renamed Black Osprey. She remained on the Rotterdam route. On 3 March 1936, $345,000 of gold was to be exported from the Federal Reserve Bank of New York to the Netherlands. The Wall Street Journal speculated that Black Osprey had been chosen for the consignment.

By July 1936, Black Osprey was equipped with wireless direction finding. In 1938, American Diamond Lines renamed itself Black Diamond Lines.

On 24 March 1938, Black Osprey struck the 311 GRT British motor coaster Chagford in dense fog off St Catherine's Point on the Isle of Wight, sinking her within five minutes. Black Osprey rescued Chagford's captain and two members of her crew, but searched in vain for three hours for her chief engineer and two other missing men. After the fog lifted, the survivors were transferred to a fishing boat that took them ashore, and Black Osprey resumed her voyage from Rotterdam to Philadelphia.

== Second World War ==
On 6 September 1939, only days after the Second World War began, the Royal Navy detained Black Osprey in Weymouth, Dorset, for inspection. She was inspected for contraband, and released a week later to continue her voyage to Antwerp. The UK stated that her inspection took so long because Black Osprey's manifest listed some 400 items. By 26 October, the Royal Navy had again detained Black Osprey. She was still detained on 8 November, when the State Department published a list of 40 US ships detained by belligerents. In November 1939, the US government imposed a "Neutrality Zone" around parts of Europe, which stopped Black Diamond Line from using US-registered ships for its transatlantic cargo services. By 14 December that year, it had chartered all but one of its fleet to other operators.

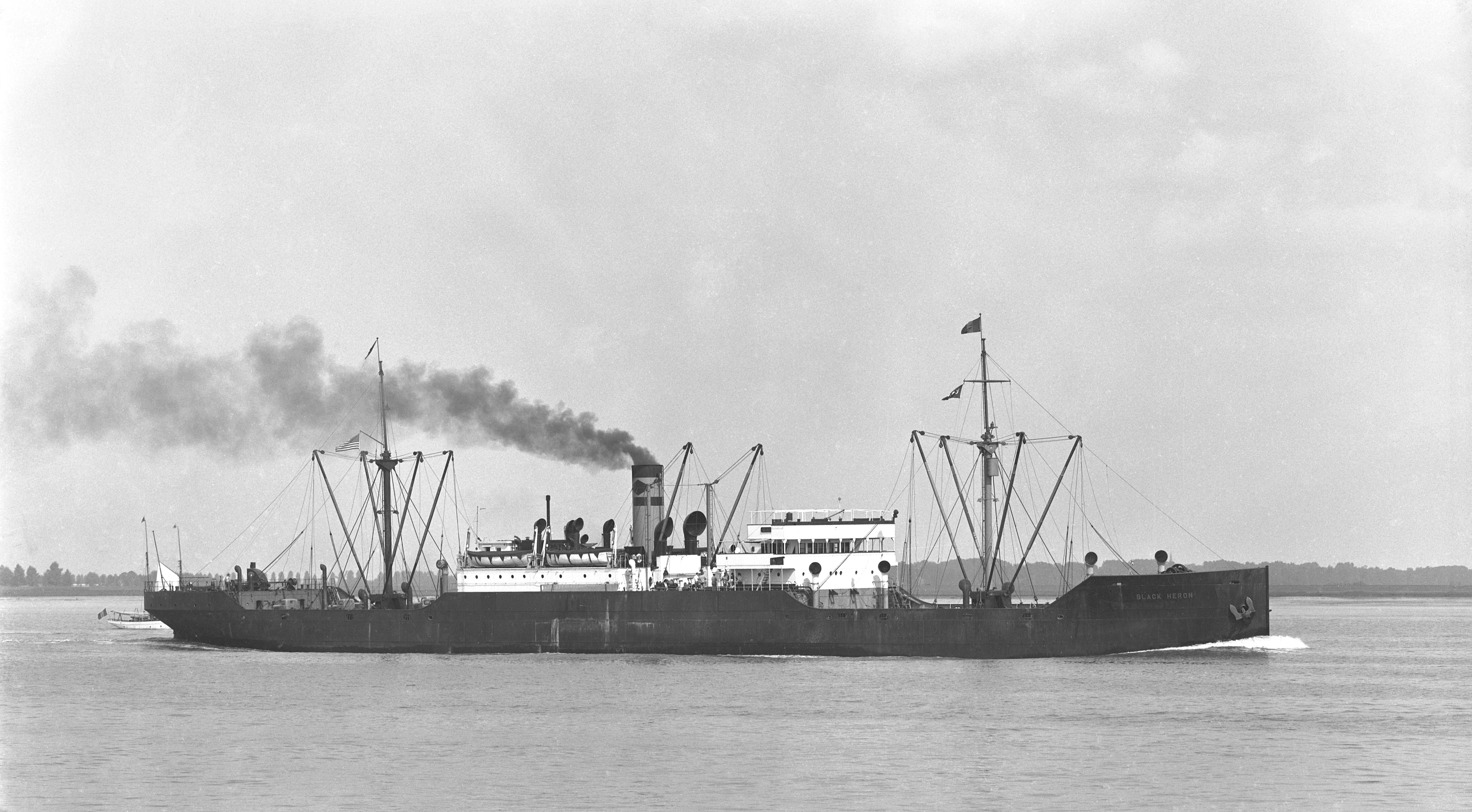
Black Heron, which the States Marine Corporation chartered along with Black Osprey and Black Condor

The States Marine Corporation chartered Black Osprey and Black Condor to trade between the Far East and ports in the Gulf of Mexico, and then added Black Heron to the same service. In 1940, Black Osprey called at ports including Singapore and Honolulu. On 19 October, a typhoon with winds exceeding 115 miles per hour (185 km/h) hit Wake Island. Black Osprey was diverted through a heavy sea to check on the welfare of the 35 men at the Pan American Clipper base there, and found them all to be safe.

In November 1940, Black Diamond applied to the United States Maritime Commission (USMC) for permission to sell eight of its ships to UK shipping interests. It was reported that Cairn Line of Newcastle upon Tyne sought to buy Black Osprey and Black Condor. In fact, it may have been that the UK Ministry of Shipping sought to buy the ships, and place them under Cairn Line management. On 3 December, the USMC agreed to the sale of only four of the eight Black Diamond ships: Black Condor and Black Osprey, which Cairn Line would manage; and Black Heron and Back Tern, which Cunard-White Star Line would manage.

== UK ownership ==
The Ministry of Shipping bought Black Osprey, and registered her in London. On 10 December 1940, she left Philadelphia. She called at Baltimore, and on 30 January 1941 reached Halifax, Nova Scotia, with a cargo of steel. Armed with two machine guns, and with Captain Sidney Whayman Parks as her Master, she left Halifax on 3 February in Convoy HX 107. In bad weather a week later, she lost contact with the convoy.

At 01:30 hrs on 18 February, south of Iceland, her funnel caught fire, and she hove to in poor visibility for her crew to fight the fire. At 02:27 hrs, U-96 fired one torpedo at her, but missed. U-96's commander, Fregattenkapitän Heinrich Lehmann-Willenbrock, may have assumed that Black Osprey was moving, and thus aimed ahead of her. At about 03:00 hrs, Black Osprey's crew got her funnel fire under control, and she got under way. At 03:25 hrs, the U-boat again fired one torpedo. This struck her port side between her number one and two holds, blowing off their hatch covers. Her wireless officer transmitted a distress signal, and Captain Parks and his crew tried to launch all four of her lifeboats. However, there was a heavy sea, which washed her port forward lifeboat back onto her foredeck, which by then was awash. 12 minutes after being hit, Black Osprey sank at position 61°18′N 18°6′W.

In the rough sea, the survivors broke several oars as they tried to row, and the boats became lost contact with each other. During the second night, survivors in the port aft boat sighted flares from one of the other boats, and sighted the boat at daybreak. However, they then lost sight of the other boat. The Norwegian refrigerated cargo ship Mosdale received Black Osprey's distress signal, and changed course to seek survivors. At 06:00 hrs on 20 February, she found the port aft boat. The 11 survivors in her were too weak to climb aboard, so the Norwegian chief officer climbed down into the lifeboat, and harnessed each survivor with lines to be hauled aboard. Mosdale circled in search for the other boats, but found none. On 22 February she reached Barry Docks in south Wales, where she landed the survivors.

== Bibliography ==
- Bureau of Navigation (1919). Fifty-First Annual List of Merchant Vessels of the United States (PDF). Washington, DC: Government Printing Office – via HyperWar.
- Colton, Tim (2008). "Skinner & Eddy, Seattle WA". Shipbuilding Histor. The Colton Company. Archived from the original on 16 September 2008.
- Cressman, Robert J (22 January 2024). "West Arrow (Id. No. 2585)". Dictionary of American Naval Fighting Ships. Naval History and Heritage Command.
- Crowell, Benedict; Wilson, Robert Forrest (1921). The Road to France: The Transportation of Troops and Military Supplies, 1917–1918. How America Went to War: An Account From Official Sources of the Nation's War Activities, 1917–1920. New Haven, CT: Yale University Press. OCLC 18696066.
- de la Pedraja Tomán, René (1994). "Black Diamond Steamship Corporation". A Historical Dictionary of the U.S. Merchant Marine and Shipping Industry: Since the Introduction of Steam. Westport, CT: Greenwood Press. ISBN 978-0-313-27225-7. OCLC 29311518.
- Lloyd's Register of Shipping. Vol. II.–Steamers. London: Lloyd's Register of Shipping. 1919 – via Internet Archive.
- Lloyd's Register of Shipping. Vol. II.–Steamers. London: Lloyd's Register of Shipping. 1921 – via Internet Archive.
- Lloyd's Register of Shipping (PDF). Vol. II.–Steamers and Motorships of 300 Tons Gross and Over. London: Lloyd's Register of Shipping. 1931 – via Southampton City Council.
- Lloyd's Register of Shipping. Vol. II.–Steamers and Motorships of 300 Tons Gross and Over. London: Lloyd's Register of Shipping. 1934 – via Southampton City Council.
- Lloyd's Register of Shipping (PDF). Vol. II.–Steamers and Motorships of 300 Tons Gross and Over. London: Lloyd's Register of Shipping. 1936 – via Southampton City Council.
- Lloyd's Register of Shipping (PDF). Vol. II.–Steamers and Motorships of 300 Tons Gross and Over. London: Lloyd's Register of Shipping. 1937 – via Southampton City Council.
- Lloyd's Register of Shipping (PDF). Vol. I.–Steamers and Motorships of 300 Tons. Trawlers, Tugs, Dredgers, etc. London: Lloyd's Register of Shipping. 1940 – via Southampton City Council.
- Skinner & Eddy (October 1918). "Consistent Building Record". Pacific Marine Review (display advertisement). San Francisco: JS Hines: 143. OCLC 2449383.
- "West Arrow". Miramar Ship Index. RB Haworth.
