= Alonzo E. Taylor =

American food researcher and educator

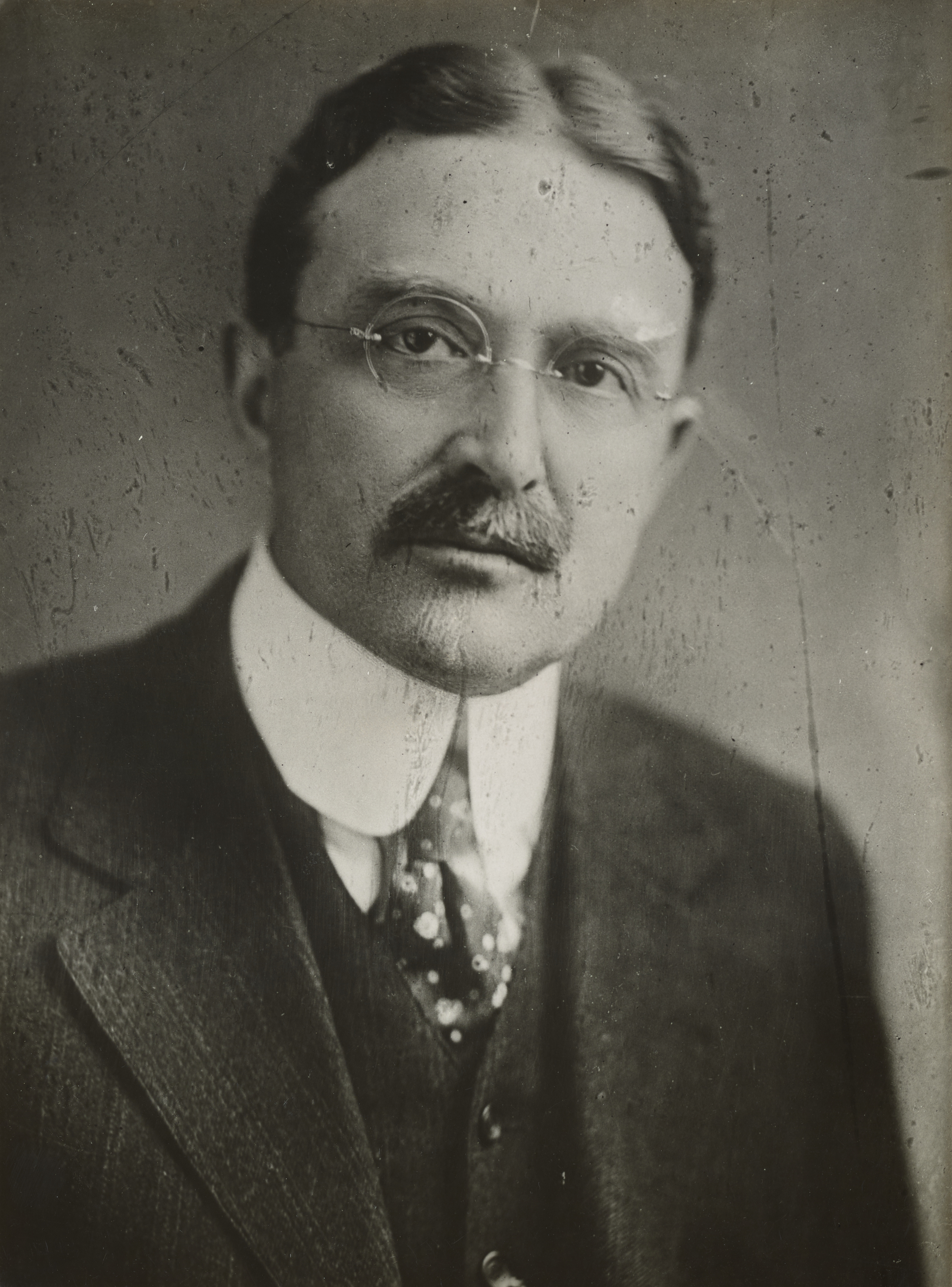
- Taylor, c. 1917–1918
- Born: Alonzo Engelbert Taylor; Alden, Iowa, U.S.
- Died: May 20, 1949 (aged 78); Palo Alto, California, U.S.
- Resting place: Alden, Iowa, U.S.
- Education: Cornell University; DePauw University; University of Berlin
- Alma mater: University of Pennsylvania (MD); University of Wisconsin (LLB)
- Occupations: Educator; researcher; writer
- Spouse: Madeline Peck (m. 1899; died 1912)

Alonzo Engelbert Taylor (died May 20, 1949) was an American food researcher and educator. He served on the U.S. War Trade Board during World War I. He taught at the University of California, Berkeley, University of Pennsylvania and was director of the Food Research Institute at Stanford University. He worked for General Mills from 1929 to 1945.

== Early life ==
Alonzo Engelbert Taylor was born in Alden, Iowa, to Mrs. Louisa Taylor. He studied at Cornell University, DePauw University and the University of Berlin. He graduated from the University of Pennsylvania with a Doctor of Medicine in 1894 and he graduated from the University of Wisconsin with a Bachelor of Laws in 1920.

== Career ==
In 1899, Taylor joined the University of California, Berkeley as head of the medical department and as professor of pathology and physiological chemistry. In 1910, he left Stanford to work at University of Pennsylvania as a professor of physiological chemistry.

In 1916, Taylor was an attaché at the United States Embassy in Berlin. He investigated food conditions throughout Germany. In May 1917, he began a study on investigating the use of grain in manufacture of intoxicants. From 1917 to 1919, he served as a scientific and economic adviser of the U.S. War Trade Board. After the armistice, he worked with Herbert Hoover, then director of the American Relief Administration, in the European relief effort. Taylor's focus was studying the defeated nations' dietary requirements.

In 1921, Taylor joined Food Research Institute at Stanford University as director. He researched the international relations of food supplies. He remained in that position until 1936. In 1927, President Calvin Coolidge appointed Taylor as a delegate to the Geneva World Economic Conference. In 1931, he was a consulting expert of the American delegation at the International Wheat Conference in London.

In 1929, Taylor became a member of the research committee at General Mills to improve nutritional values and diet for the general public. He was director of research for General Mills from 1936 to 1940. He then served as a consultant until 1945.

== Works ==
These works of Alonzo E. Taylor are available via Internet Archive:

- 1907: "On Fermentation", Pathology 1(8): 87 to 341, a University of California publication
- 1912: Digestion and Metabolism, the physiological and pathological chemistry of nutrition for physicians and students
- 1917: (with Vernon Lyman Kellogg) The Food Problem

== Personal life ==
Taylor married Madeline Peck on November 2, 1899, in Chicago. She died at a Chicago hospital in 1912 after a fall from a fourth story window of the Auditorium Hotel. They had two sons and one daughter, Alonzo E. Jr., Morris P. and Mrs. Ellide Taylor Tyrrell.

Taylor died on May 20, 1949, aged 78, at his home in Palo Alto, California. He was buried in Alden, Iowa.
