= German submarine U-77 (1940) =

German World War II submarine

History

Nazi Germany
- Name: U-77
- Ordered: 25 January 1939
- Builder: Bremer Vulkan, Bremen-Vegesack
- Yard number: 5
- Laid down: 28 March 1940
- Launched: 23 November 1940
- Commissioned: 18 January 1941
- Fate: Scuttled, 29 March 1943, off Calpe, Spain

General characteristics
- Class & type: Type VIIC submarine
- Displacement: 769 tonnes (757 long tons) surfaced; 871 t (857 long tons) submerged
- Length: 67.10 m (220 ft 2 in) o/a; 50.50 m (165 ft 8 in) pressure hull
- Beam: 6.20 m (20 ft 4 in) o/a; 4.70 m (15 ft 5 in) pressure hull
- Height: 9.60 m (31 ft 6 in)
- Draught: 4.72 m (15 ft 6 in)
- Installed power: 2,800–3,200 PS (2,100–2,400 kW; 2,800–3,200 bhp) (diesels); 750 PS (550 kW; 740 shp) (electric)
- Propulsion: 2 shafts; 2 × diesel engines; 2 × electric motors
- Speed: 17.7 knots (32.8 km/h; 20.4 mph) surfaced; 7.6 knots (14.1 km/h; 8.7 mph) submerged
- Range: 8,500 nmi (15,700 km; 9,800 mi) at 10 knots (19 km/h; 12 mph) surfaced; 80 nmi (150 km; 92 mi) at 4 knots (7.4 km/h; 4.6 mph) submerged
- Test depth: 230 m (750 ft); Calculated crush depth: 250–295 m (820–968 ft)
- Complement: 44-52 officers and ratings
- Armament: 5 × 53.3 cm (21 in) torpedo tubes (four bow, one stern); 14 × torpedoes or 26 TMA mines; 1 × 8.8 cm (3.46 in) deck gun (220 rounds); 1 x 2 cm (0.79 in) C/30 AA gun

Service record
- Part of: 7th U-boat Flotilla; 18 January – 31 December 1941; 23rd U-boat Flotilla; 1 January – 30 April 1942; 29th U-boat Flotilla; 1 May 1942 – 29 March 1943
- Identification codes: M 38 391
- Commanders: Oblt.z.S. / Kptlt. Heinrich Schonder; 18 January 1941 – 2 September 1942; Oblt.z.S. Otto Hartman; 2 September 1942 – 29 March 1943
- Operations: 11 patrols: 1st patrol: 29 May – 7 July 1941; 2nd patrol: 2 August – 10 September 1941; 3rd patrol: 11 October – 13 November 1941; 4th patrol: a. 10 – 19 December 1941; b. 21 December 1941 – 14 January 1942; 5th patrol: a. 28 March – 3 April 1942; b. 7 – 11 April 1942; 6th patrol: a. 6 – 17 June 1942; b. 23 June – 9 July 1942; 7th patrol: a. 16 July – 21 August 1942; b. 25 – 30 August 1942; 8th patrol: 12 October – 1 November 1942; 9th patrol: 3 November – 5 December 1942; 10th patrol: 26 January – 10 February 1943; 11th patrol: 3 – 29 March 1943
- Victories: 14 merchant ships sunk (31,171 GRT); 1 warship sunk (1,050 tons); 2 merchant ship total loss (11,637 GRT); 2 merchant ships damaged (5,384 GRT); 2 warships damaged (2,880 tons)

Flo29

German submarine U-77 was a Type VIIC U-boat of Nazi Germany's Kriegsmarine built by the Bremer Vulkan-Vegesacker Werft, Bremen-Vegesack. Her keel was laid down on 28 March 1940, by Bremer Vulkan of Bremen-Vegesack, Germany as yard number 5. She was launched on 23 November 1940 and commissioned on 18 January 1941, with Oberleutnant zur See Heinrich Schonder in command until 2 September 1942, when he was succeeded by Oblt.z.S. Otto Hartmann, who remained in charge until the U-boat's loss.

The boat was scuttled on 29 March 1943 off Calpe, Spain, after receiving heavy damage by two British aircraft.

== Design ==
German Type VIIC submarines were preceded by the shorter Type VIIB submarines. U-77 had a displacement of 769 tonnes (757 long tons) when at the surface and 871 tonnes (857 long tons) while submerged. She had a total length of 67.10 m (220 ft 2 in), a pressure hull length of 50.50 m (165 ft 8 in), a beam of 6.20 m (20 ft 4 in), a height of 9.60 m (31 ft 6 in), and a draught of 4.74 m (15 ft 7 in). The submarine was powered by two MAN M 6 V 40/46 four-stroke, six-cylinder supercharged diesel engines producing a total of 2,800 to 3,200 metric horsepower (2,060 to 2,350 kW; 2,760 to 3,160 shp) for use while surfaced, two Brown, Boveri & Cie GG UB 720/8 double-acting electric motors producing a total of 750 metric horsepower (550 kW; 740 shp) for use while submerged. She had two shafts and two 1.23 m (4 ft) propellers. The boat was capable of operating at depths of up to 230 metres (750 ft).

The submarine had a maximum surface speed of 17.7 knots (32.8 km/h; 20.4 mph) and a maximum submerged speed of 7.6 knots (14.1 km/h; 8.7 mph). When submerged, the boat could operate for 80 nautical miles (150 km; 92 mi) at 4 knots (7.4 km/h; 4.6 mph); when surfaced, she could travel 8,500 nautical miles (15,700 km; 9,800 mi) at 10 knots (19 km/h; 12 mph). U-77 was fitted with five 53.3 cm (21 in) torpedo tubes (four fitted at the bow and one at the stern), fourteen torpedoes, one 8.8 cm (3.46 in) SK C/35 naval gun, 220 rounds, and a 2 cm (0.79 in) C/30 anti-aircraft gun. The boat had a complement of between forty-four and sixty.

== Service history ==
U-77 conducted 11 patrols, sinking 15 ships totalling 31,171 GRT and 1,050 tons, damaging two others, totalling 5,384 GRT. She also damaged two warships totalling 2,880 tons and caused two ship of 11,637 GRT to be declared a total loss. She was a member of six wolfpacks.

=== First patrol ===
U-77 departed Kiel on 29 May 1941. Her route took in the gap between Iceland and the Faroe Islands.

She sank the Tresillian on 13 June southeast of Cape Race ( Newfoundland ). Using her deck gun, she fired 87 rounds, scoring 60-65 hits; but it needed a torpedo to administer the coup de grâce. She then sank the Arakaka, a weather ship, on the 22nd, 450 nmi (830 km; 520 mi) east of St. Johns. There were no survivors. It was a similar story with the Anna Bulgaris south of Cape Farewell, (Greenland).

U-77 docked in St. Nazaire in occupied France on 7 July.

=== Second and third patrols ===
The boat's second foray began with her departure from St. Nazaire on 2 August 1941, but despite covering large tracts of the Atlantic, she returned to the French base on 10 September empty-handed.

For her third sortie, U-77 once more found the cupboard bare west of Ireland and the Bay of Biscay. Nothing.

=== Fourth patrol ===
U-77's next patrol was divided into two. Part one was into the Mediterranean. Leaving St. Nazaire on 10 December 1941, she slipped past the heavily defended Strait of Gibraltar and entered Messina in northeast Sicily on the 19th.

On the way, she sank SS Empire Barracuda 34 nmi (63 km; 39 mi) from Cape Trafalgar [before the Gibraltar experience], on the 15th.

Part two involved the boat's attack on the British destroyer HMS Kimberley off Tobruk on 12 January 1942. The warship's stern was blown off, but she was towed to Alexandria for temporary repairs before more permanent restoration was carried out in Bombay. The ship returned to service in January 1944.

The submarine docked at Salamis in Greece on 14 January.

=== Fifth patrol ===
Late on 1 April 1942, U-77 was attacked by a Fairey Swordfish of No. 815 Squadron FAA, north-by-northeast of Sidi Barrani. The damage inflicted meant the boat was unable to dive. She returned to Salamis on the third.

=== Sixth patrol ===
Having moved to La Spezia in northwest Italy in April, U-77 departed the port for the initial portion of a two-part patrol on 6 June 1942. She sank the destroyer HMS Grove north of Sollum on the 12th. This was during Operation Vigorous, [a supply convoy to Malta].

The U-boat was unsuccessfully attacked by HMS Thrasher (N37), a British T-class submarine, off what today is the Israeli coast on 4 July. (Note: there is some confusion over this incident as the U-boat's own page on 'uboat.net' also puts her further west on that day and does not mention an attack).

U-77 finished the patrol in Salamis on 9 July.

=== Seventh and eighth patrols ===
Departing Salamis on 16 July 1942, her only victory was the Greek sailing ship Vassilliki, which she sank with 10 rounds from the deck gun east of Cyprus on the 22nd.

In late August, the boat briefly moved to Pola (or Pula) in Croatia at the 'top' of the Adriatic, from where she sortied on 12 October 1942 before steaming to La Spezia once more on 1 November.

=== Ninth patrol ===
U-77 torpedoed the sloop HMS Stork on 12 November 1942 but was attacked by the corvettes HMS Lotus and Poppy the following day northeast of Algiers. The slightly damaged U-boat returned to La Spezia on 5 December.

=== Tenth patrol ===
U-77 sank two more ships - the Empire Banner and the Empire Webster, both on 7 February 1943 west of Algiers. She had departed La Spezia on 26 January and returned there on 10 February.

=== 11th patrol and loss ===
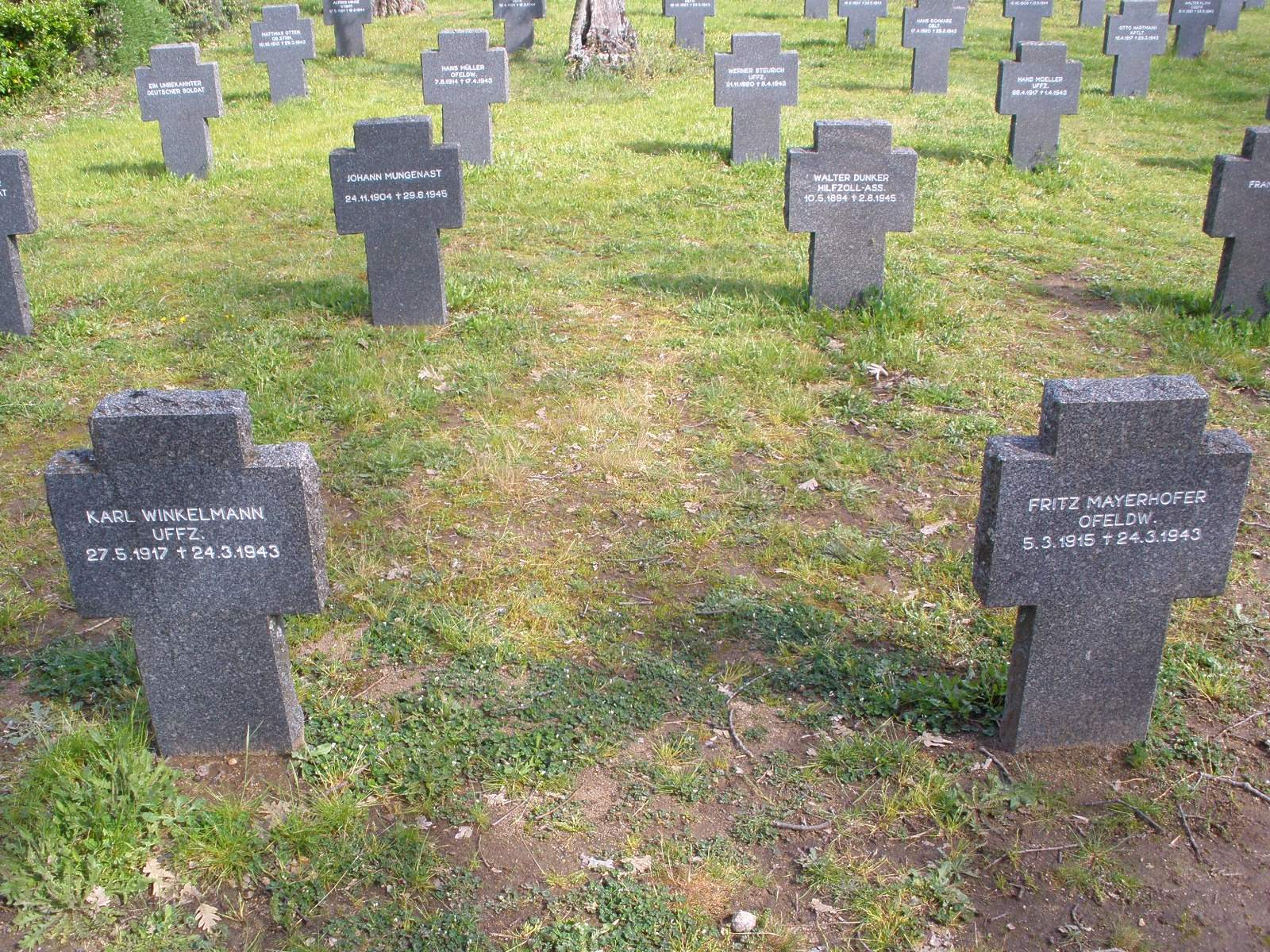
German Military Cemetery in Cuacos de Yuste. In the foreground, the graves of two of members of the submarine crew. In 1983, all the German soldiers and sailors buried in Spain from the WWI and WWII were exhumed from their graves and buried in this cemetery. The corpses of the U-77 were taken from the cemetery of Alicante to their final resting place in Cuacos.

The boat departed La Spezia for the last time on 3 March 1943. On 28 March, U-77 was attacked by two British Lockheed Hudsons, V of No. 48 and L of No. 233 Squadron RAF, based in Gibraltar, which dropped depth charges, and heavily damaged U-77. At 01:15 the following day, 29 March, Hartmann ordered his crew off the boat, and scuttled it in position 37°42′N 00°10′E east of Cartagena/Cape de Palos. Of the 47 crew members, nine survived the night and were picked up by Spanish fishing boats.

=== Wolfpacks ===
U-77 took part in six wolfpacks, namely:

- West (6 – 20 June 1941)
- Grönland (10 – 23 August 1941)
- Kurfürst (23 August – 2 September 1941)
- Seewolf (2 – 7 September 1941)
- Reissewolf (21 – 31 October 1941)
- Störtebecker (15 November – 2 December 1941)

== Summary of raiding history ==
Date	Ship	Nationality	Tonnage (Note: Merchant ship tonnages are in gross register tons. Military vessels are listed by tons displacement.)	Fate
13 June 1941	Tresillian	United Kingdom	4,743	Sunk
22 June 1941	Arakaka	United Kingdom	2,379	Sunk
25 June 1941	Anna Bulgaris	Greece	4,603	Sunk
15 December 1941	Empire Barracuda	United Kingdom	4,972	Sunk
12 January 1942	HMS Kimberley	Royal Navy	1,690	Damaged
12 June 1942	HMS Grove	Royal Navy	1,050	Sunk
22 July 1942	Vassiliki	Greece	140	Sunk
24 July 1942	SV Toufic El Rahman	Syria	30	Sunk
30 July 1942	Fany	Egypt	43	Sunk
1 August 1942	St. Simon	Egypt	85	Sunk
6 August 1942	Adnan	Egypt	155	Damaged
6 August 1942	Ezzet	Egypt	158	Sunk
10 August 1942	Kharouf	Mandatory Palestine	158	Sunk
16 August 1942	Daniel	Mandatory Palestine	100	Sunk
20 August 1942	Mahrous	Syria	18	Sunk
12 November 1942	HMS Stork	Royal Navy	1,190	Damaged
7 February 1943	Empire Banner	United Kingdom	6,699	Sunk
7 February 1943	Empire Webster	United Kingdom	7,043	Sunk
16 March 1943	Hadleigh	United Kingdom	5,222	Total loss
16 March 1943	Merchant Prince	United Kingdom	5,229	Damaged
26 March 1943	City of Perth	United Kingdom	6,415	Total loss

== See also ==
- Mediterranean U-boat Campaign (World War II)

== Bibliography ==
- Busch, Rainer; Röll, Hans-Joachim (1999). German U-boat commanders of World War II: a biographical dictionary. Translated by Brooks, Geoffrey. London, Annapolis, Md: Greenhill Books, Naval Institute Press. ISBN 1-55750-186-6.
- Busch, Rainer; Röll, Hans-Joachim (1999). Deutsche U-Boot-Verluste von September 1939 bis Mai 1945 [German U-boat losses from September 1939 to May 1945]. Der U-Boot-Krieg (in German). Vol. IV. Hamburg, Berlin, Bonn: Mittler. ISBN 3-8132-0514-2.
- Gröner, Erich; Jung, Dieter; Maass, Martin (1991). U-boats and Mine Warfare Vessels. German Warships 1815–1945. Vol. 2. Translated by Thomas, Keith; Magowan, Rachel. London: Conway Maritime Press. ISBN 0-85177-593-4.
