= National Capital Parks =

Former group of national parks

The National Capital Parks was a unit of the National Park System of the United States, now divided into multiple administrative units. It encompasses a variety of federally owned properties in and around the District of Columbia including memorials, monuments, parks, interiors of traffic circles and squares, triangles formed by irregular intersections, and other open spaces.

== History ==
=== Selection of the Site and Design of the City ===
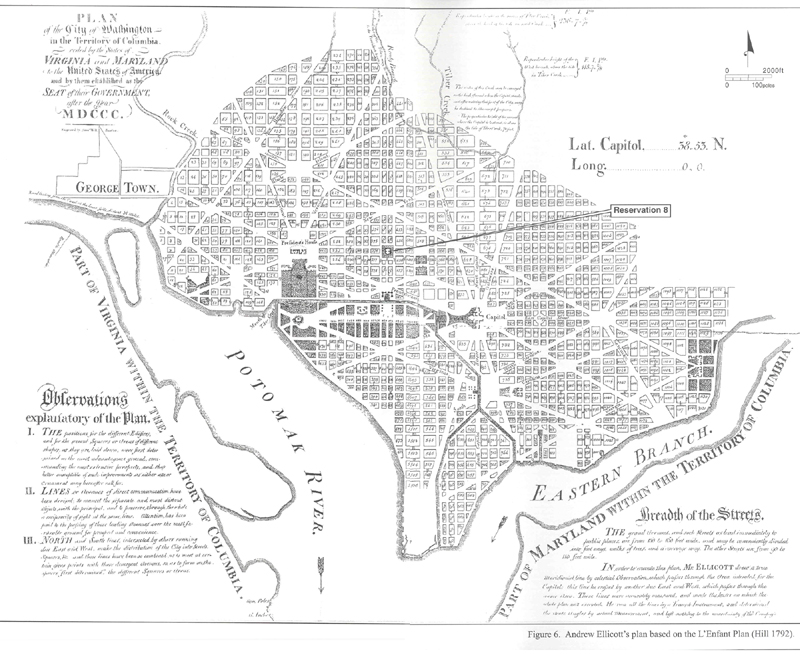
A contemporary reprint of Samuel Hill's 1792 print of Ellicott's "Plan of the City of Washington in the Territory of Columbia", published in "Massachusetts Magazine", Boston, May 1792, showing street names, lot numbers, coordinates and legends.

In 1790, Congress, through the Residence Act, authorized President George Washington to procure an area along the Potomac River to locate a new capital for the nation. In 1791, President Washington appointed Pierre Charles L'Enfant to design what would become the City of Washington under the supervision of three Commissioners appointed to oversee the development of what would become the District of Columbia. L’Enfant’s plan was ultimately modified by Andrew Ellicott when he ended in a dispute with the commissioners and Washington ultimately dismissed him. The design created many of the spaces which would ultimately become the National Capital Parks.

=== Acquisition of Park Lands ===
The original lands of the National Capital Parks were acquired pursuant to Congress's authorization with the Residence Act of 1790. Under this authority, between 1790 and 1867, The Mall, Monument Grounds, Capitol Grounds, President's Park, Lafayette Park, Franklin Park, Garfield Park and a total of 301 separate reservations in the original City of Washington were acquired as public properties. Much of this land remains Federal property today and is part of the National Capital Parks.

During the American Civil War, 1861–1865, the Union Army built a ring of fortifications to protect the city. These fortifications resulted in additional property becoming federally owned. In 1924, Congress created the National Capital Park Commission to acquire land in the District for the purpose of creating and preserving the sites of the Civil War fortifications and interconnecting parkways.

In 1926, Congress passed legislation to create a system of parks out of the Civil War fortifications, which allowed acquisition of additional property to provide an interconnecting roadway as a parkway ring around the city. This is known today as the Fort Circle Parks. Although the roadway was never built, the property remains today in Federal hands.

In 1933, title and control of parklands in the District was transferred to the National Park Service, creating a new unit of the National Park System called the National Capital Parks. No legislation explicitly created the National Capital Parks. Rather, it was created as a result of an Executive Order which, among other things, abolished several federal agencies including the Arlington Memorial Bridge Commission, Public Buildings Commission, Public Buildings and Public Parks of the National Capital, National Memorial Commission, and Rock Creek and Potomac Parkway Commission and consolidated their functions into the Office of National Parks, Buildings, and Reservations of the Department of the Interior. In 1935, the name was changed back to National Park Service.

In 1975, Baltimore–Washington Parkway was incorporated into the unit.

== Administration ==
Administration of parklands that was in National Capital Parks is now divided among several administrative units of the National Park Service:

- National Capital Parks-East – administers National Park properties in the District, consisting of neighborhood parks, circles, and several properties in Maryland.
- National Mall and Memorial Parks – formerly called National Capital Parks-Central, this unit administers all properties in and around the Mall.
- White House and President's Park – administers The White House, a visitor center, Lafayette Square, and The Ellipse.
- Rock Creek Park – administers properties in the north and the northwest of the District.
- George Washington Memorial Parkway – In addition to properties in Virginia, this unit administers properties in the District: Clara Barton Parkway; Theodore Roosevelt Island; Arlington Memorial Bridge; and the Columbia Island parks, including Lady Bird Johnson Park, Lyndon Baines Johnson Memorial Grove, Navy – Merchant Marine Memorial, and the Columbia Island Marina.
- Chesapeake and Ohio Canal National Historical Park – administers the entire C&O Canal NHP, including the portion inside the District.
