= World War II United States Merchant Navy =

Fleet of merchant vessels that took part of World War II for the United States

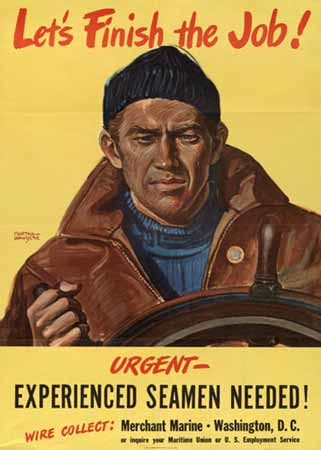
A United States World War II recruiting poster for the merchant marine

World War II United States Merchant Navy, also called the United States Merchant Marines, was the largest civilian Navy in the world, which operated during World War II. With the United States fighting a world war in all the world oceans, the demand for cargo and fuel was very high. Cargo and fuel was needed around the world for the United States Navy, United States Army, United States Marine Corps, United States Army Air Forces, United States Coast Guard and the support of the allied nations of the United States. American steamship companies chartered ships from the Maritime Commission and War Shipping Administration to meet the demand. Many United States Merchant Marine ships were newly built in the Emergency Shipbuilding Program, other ships were older World War I ships that were put back in service, or private ships acquired under Emergency war requisitions. The Merchant Navy operated in the Pacific War and European war. Over 200 US Merchant ships took part in the D-day Normandy landings. To make a Normandy breakwater Harbor, called Mulberry harbour, 33 merchant ships were sunk 1,000 yards from shore. Some of the ghosts merchant ships used were damaged and others were deemed too old.

== Crew ==
The ships were operated by volunteer civilian crews, that were employed and trained by private shipping and passenger companies. Most ships had armament for self defense, most ships had deck guns manned by United States Navy Armed Guard from the US Navy Troops. The 144,857 strong Navy Armed Guards also operated the radio, semaphore-signal flags, and the signal lamp. Navy Armed Guard were also training in first aid. United States Navy Armed Guard operated on 6,200 ships by the end of the war. Cross training with the ship's crew to cover roles was often completed. In 1943 the United States Merchant Marine Academy was founded to train Merchant Marine officers.

The men of our American Merchant Marine have pushed through despite the perils of the submarine, the dive bomber and the surface raider. They have returned voluntarily to their jobs at sea again and again, because they realized that the life-lines to our battle fronts would be broken if they did not carry out their vital part in this global war. . . In their hands, our vital supply lines are expanding. Their skill and determination will keep open the highway to victory and unconditional surrender. President Franklin D. Roosevelt, 1943

== Losses ==
Merchant Navy at its peak had over 215,000 men operating the Merchant Navy ships. The losses by the end of the war was 8,651 crew deaths. Merchant Marine were killed at a per capita rate much higher than those of the combined United States Armed Forces. Merchant Navy crews were killed at a rate of 1 in 26 (US Navy rate was 1 in 114). The greatest loss was in the Battle of the Atlantic due to U-boat torpedo or deck gun attacks. During the war 3.1 million tons of US merchant ships were sunk in 733 ships. Merchant ships were lost due to submarines, destroyers, naval mines, armed raiders, gun boats, aircraft attacks, kamikaze attacks, grounding and ocean storms. Convoy system with destroyers, escort carriers, submarine chasers, planes and other support, reduced losses by 1944. Merchant Navy ship sunk or captured by Imperial Japan caused 609 crewmen to be captured as prisoners of war, many died in prison.

== Ships ==
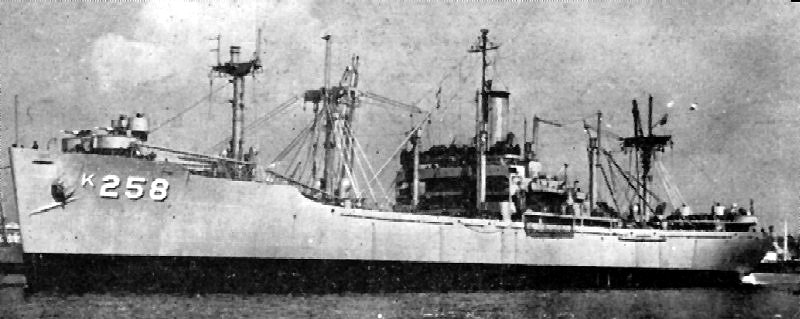
A Victory ship of World War II

Liberty ship of World War II

The Emergency Shipbuilding Program built many types of ships to support the war. The most numerous ships were the 2,710 cargo Liberty ships. Liberty ships were built between 1941 and 1945, with a new module assembly process so that about three ships were built every two days. Victory ships were a faster replacement ship for the Merchant Navy. Between 1944 and 1946, 531 Victory ships were built, with some to the US Navy and 414 to the Merchant Navy. The Merchant Navy also operated: other cargo ships like: Type N3, Type C1, Type C2, Type C3, and the largest Type C4. Merchant Navy operated tanker ships like: T1 tanker, T2 tanker and the largest T3 Tankers for fuel oil, aviation gasoline, and Diesel fuel. Merchant Navy operated special ships like: Type L6, called Lakers, Type P1 small Passenger ships, Type P2 Passenger, Type R, refrigerated cargo ships, Type B Barges and Type V Tugboats. The Merchant Navy operated Troopships, both passenger ships and cargo ships converted to troopships. For World War II 97 Victory ships temporarily were converted to troopship. By the end of the war over 11,000 ships were under the control of the War Shipping Administration.

Many World War 2 surplus merchant ships were removed from the National Defense Reserve Fleet and put into action to support the Korean War and Vietnam War.

== Post war ==
At the end of the war, the US Merchant Navy was given the task of helping bring Troops and for some their war brides home, called Operation Magic Carpet. Some traveled on Navy ships, but many of the 3,500,000 men and women came home on Merchant Navy ships, call troopships. Some of the US Merchant Navy continued in post-war relief efforts and general cargo shipping to help nations around the world recover from the devastating war. The Seagoing cowboys did United Nations Relief and Rehabilitation work from 1945 to 1947. Seagoing cowboys use cargo ships with added cages and horse stalls to take livestock to war-torn nations. Many merchant ships were placed in the Reserve Fleet after the war, some were sold, many scrapped and a few became museum ships.

== Legacy ==
- American Merchant Marine Veterans Memorial in San Pedro, California.
- World War II Merchant Marine Memorial Coyote Point Park in San Mateo County, California
- American Merchant Mariners Memorial in Battery Park, New York Harbor
- Navy – Merchant Marine Memorial in Washington, D.C.
- Action in the North Atlantic 1943 movie with Humphrey Bogart.
- The Rebels of PT-218, (The Rebels of World War II) a 2021 movie about the a Liberty ship that became a war ship.
- The Men Who Sailed the Liberty Ships Film of Veterans of the American merchant marine in World War II tell their story.
- Forgotten Victory SS Lane Victory 2021 Documentary
- Onboard a Liberty Ship, 1940s US Navy, WWII US Navy color film
- SS Hannibal Victory 1945 Documentary film.
- List of United States Merchant Navy Film and TV shows
- Rosie the Riveter World War II Home Front National Historical Park

== Notable ships ==
- SS Cynthia Olson's crew were the first American casualties of the war on 8 AM on December 7, 1941.
- SS Jean Nicolet, torpedoed by a Japanese submarine I-8 on July 2, 1944, off Ceylon. Crew saved and then most killed by Japanese.
- SS American Victory, SS Lane Victory, SS Red Oak Victory, SS John W. Brown, SS Jeremiah O'Brien, SS Arthur M. Huddell, survived the war and scrapping to become museum ships.
- SS Canada Victory, SS Hobbs Victory, SS Logan Victory, SS John Burke, SS Lewis L. Dyche each an ammunition ship, were attacked and sank with an explosion after kamikaze attack in 1945.
- Ships of Convoy PQ 17, 24 merchant ships sunk and 153 merchant mariners killed in 1942.
- SS E. A. Bryan had a munitions explosion on July 17, 1944, at Port Chicago, California.
- SS Patrick Henry was built in 4 days, 15 hours and 29 minutes, a record.
- SS Albert M. Boe, the last Liberty ship built, is now the headquarters of Trident Seafoods in Kodiak, Alaska.
- SS Ohio was attacked in a Malta convoy and was still able to deliver needed fuel in Operation Pedestal to Malta (called the saviour of the beleaguered island).
- SS Stephen Hopkins sank the German commerce raider Stier in a ship-to-ship gun battle in 1942.
- SS St. Lawrence Victory and SS Winthrop Victory were present in Tokyo Bay on Victory over Japan Day on September 2, 1945.
- SS Lawton B. Evans became a war ship in the Battle of Anzio, an eight-day battle the ship shot down five German planes.

== Ship operators ==
War Shipping Administration and United States Merchant Navy routes during World War 2

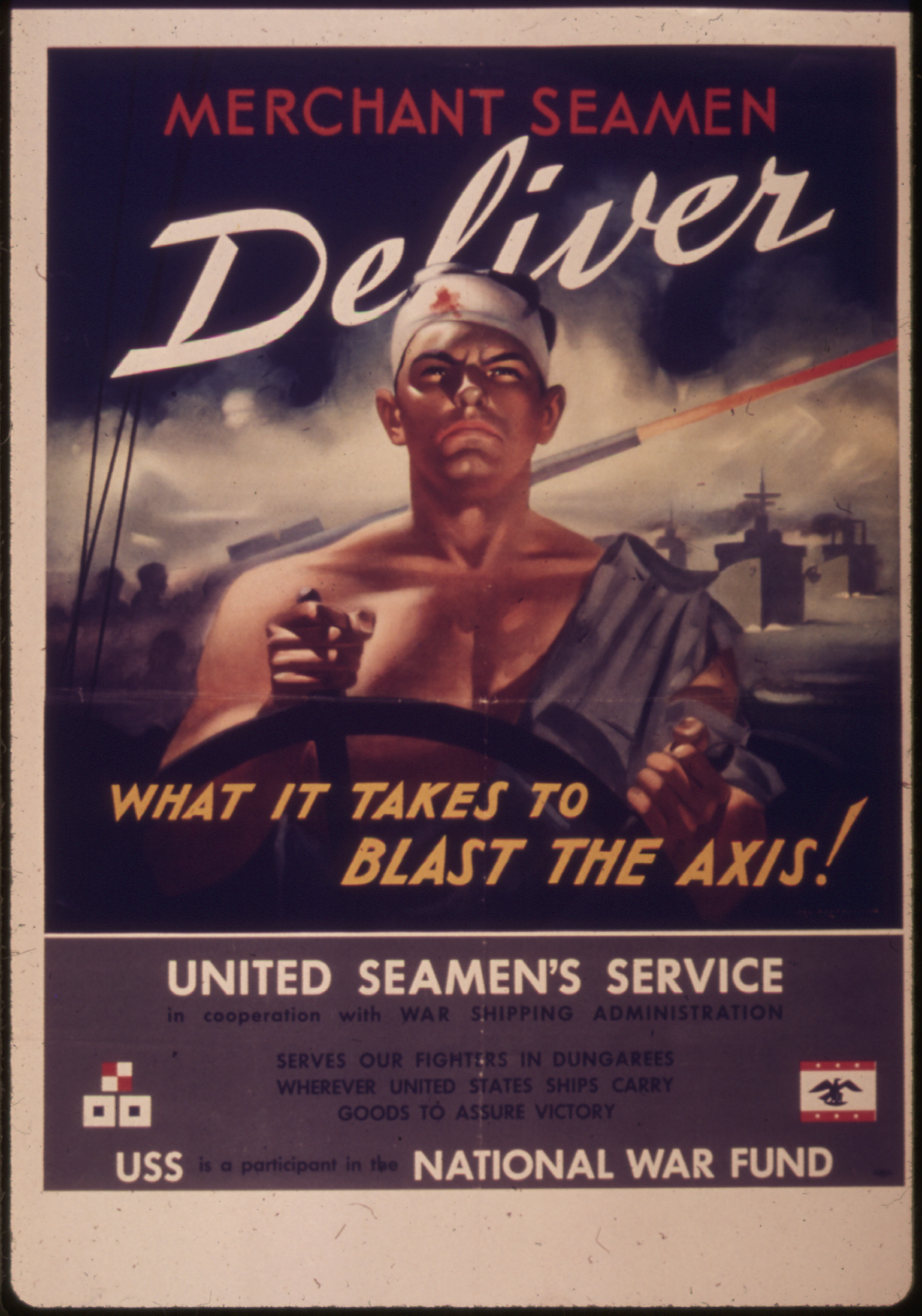
'Merchant seamen deliver what it takes to blast the Axis' - poster

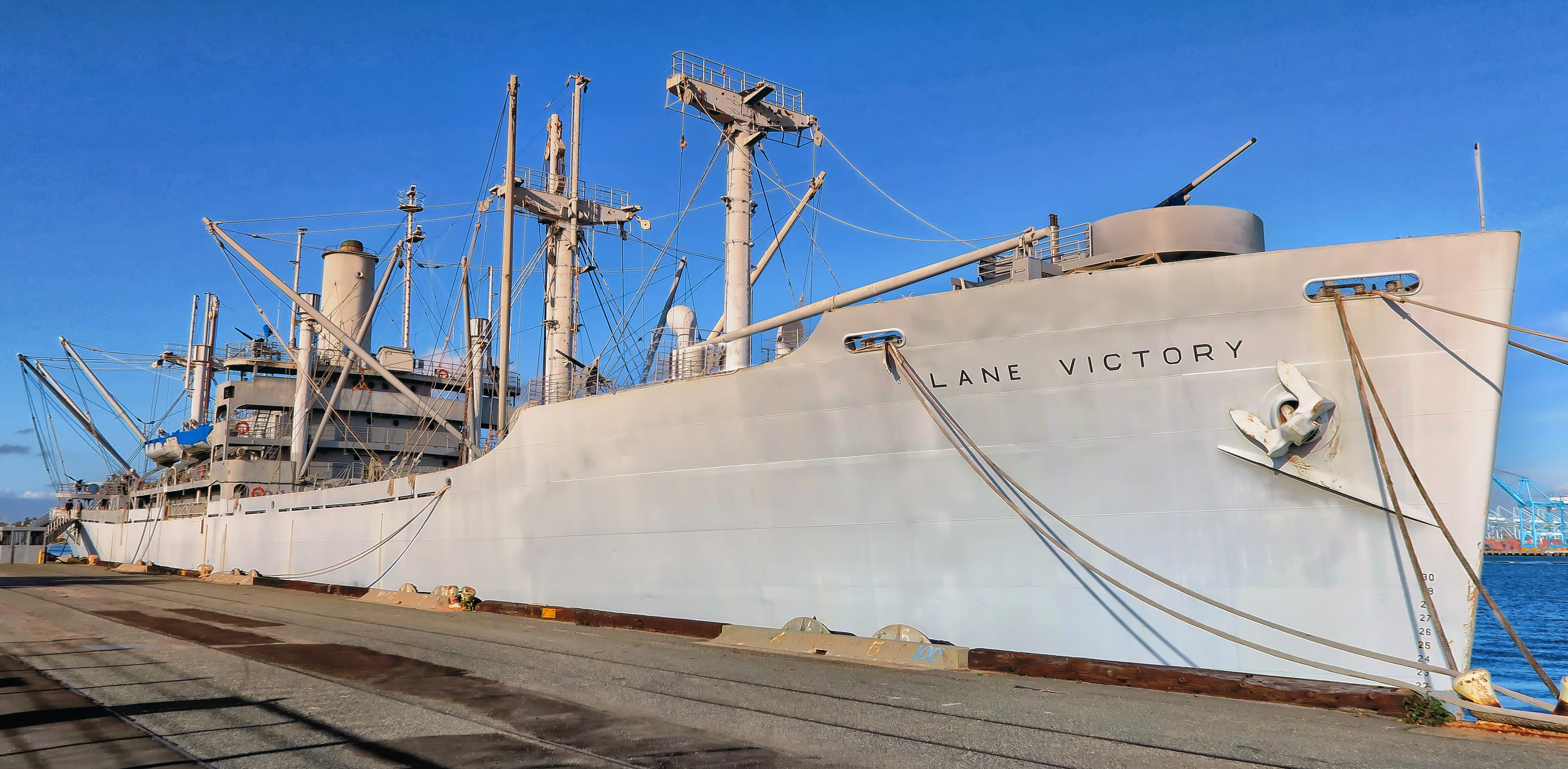
SS Lane Victory at dock, a museum ship Los Angeles, California

"The men and ships of the Merchant Marine have participated in every landing operation by the United States Marine Corps from Guadalcanal to Iwo Jima -- and we know they will be at hand with supplies and equipment when American amphibious forces hit the beaches of Japan itself." Lt. Gen. Alexander A. Vandegrift, U. S. Marine Corps Commandant

At its peak, about 130 companies served as ship operators for the War Shipping Administration. American steamship companies operating merchant ships in World War II:

| 75 To 100 Ships | |
|---|---|
| Operator | Headquarters City |
| Alaska Steamship Company | Seattle |
| American Export Lines | New York City |
| American Hawaiian Steamship Company | New York City |
| American President Lines | San Francisco |
| Grace Line Inc. | New York City |
| Isthmian Steamship Company | New York City |
| Lykes Brothers Steamship Company | New Orleans |
| Matson Navigation Company | San Francisco |
| Moore McCormack Lines | New York City |
| United Fruit Company | Boston |
| United States Line | New York City |
| Waterman Steamship Corporation | Mobile |

| 51 To 75 Ships | |
|---|---|
| Agwilines Inc. | New York City |
| Alcoa Steamship Company | New York City |
| American Mail Line | Seattle |
| American South African Line | New York City |
| A. H. Bull & Company, Inc. | New York City |
| Luckenbach Steamship Company | New York City |
| Marine Transport Line | New York City |
| Mississippi Shipping Company | New Orleans |
| Mccormick Steamship Company | San Francisco |
| Pacific-Atlantic Steamship Company | Vancouver |
| Seas Shipping Company | New York City |
| South Atlantic Steamship Lines | Savannah |
| Weyerhaeuser Steamship Company | Newark |

| 26 To 50 Ships | |
|---|---|
| American West African Line, Inc. | New York City |
| Black Diamond Steamship Company | New York City |
| Calmar Steamship Corporation | New York City |
| Coastwise Line | San Francisco |
| International Freighting Corporation | New York City |
| Mystic Steamship, a Division of Eastern Gas and Fuel Associates | Boston |
| Sprague Steamship Company | Boston |
| Sudden & Christenson Company | San Francisco |
| J. H. Winchester & Company | New York City |

| 5 To 25 Ships | |
|---|---|
| Alaska Packers' Association | San Francisco |
| Alaska Transportation Company | Seattle |
| American Foreign Steamship Corporation | New York City |
| American Range-Liberty Lines, Inc. | New York City |
| Blidberg Rothchild Company | New York City |
| Boland and Cornelius Company | Buffalo |
| A. L. Burbank & Company, Ltd. | New York City |
| Burns Steamship Company | Los Angeles |
| W. R. Chamberlin & Company | San Francisco |
| Cosmopolitan Shipping Company | New York City |
| De La Rama Steamship Company, Inc. | New York City |
| Dichmann, Wright & Pugh, Inc. | Norfolk |
| Eastern Steamship Lines | Boston |
| Fall River Navigation Company | Fall River |
| General Steamship Corporation | San Francisco |
| James Griffiths & Sons, Inc. | Seattle |
| Hammond Shipping Company | San Francisco |
| Isbrandtsen Line | New York City |
| Interocean Steamship Corporation | San Francisco |
| Merchants & Miners Transportation Company | Baltimore |
| R. A. Nicol & Company | New York City |
| North Atlantic & Gulf Steamship Company | New York City |
| Northland Transportation Company | Seattle |
| Norton Lilly Management Corporation | New York City |
| Oliver J. Olson & Company | San Francisco |
| Olympic Steamship Company | Seattle |
| Ore Steamship Company | New York City |
| Overlakes Freight Corporation | New York City |
| Parry Navigation Company | New York City |
| Pocahontas Steamship Company | New York City |
| Polarus Steamship Company | New York City |
| Pope & Talbot, Inc. | San Francisco |
| Prudential Steamship Corporation | New York City |
| William J. Rountree Company | New York City |
| Shepard Steamship Company | Boston |
| Smith & Johnson | New York City |
| Sword Line Inc. | New York City |
| Standard Fruit & Steamship Company | New Orleans |
| States Marine Corporation | New York City |
| T. J. Stevenson & Company, Inc. | New York City |
| Stockard Steamship Corporation | New York City |
| M & J Tracy Inc. | New York City |
| United States Navigation Company | New York City |
| Union Sulphur Company | New York City |
| Wessel Duval & Company | New York City |
| West India Steamship Company | New York City |
| Wilmore Steamship Company | Boston |

| 1 To 5 Ships | |
|---|---|
| American Republic Corporation (SS Oscar F. Barrett) | Houston |
| Bulk Carriers Coprp. (SS Edward B. Dudley) | New York City |
| Coastwise Transportation Corp. (SS Raymond T. Baker) | Boston |
| Intercoastal Packing Company (SS Ogontz) | Juneau |
| Nicholson Transit Company | Ecorse |
| Norwegian Shipping and Trade Mission | New York City |
| Pacific Far East Line | San Francisco |
| Pacific Lighterage Company | Seattle |
| Simpson Spence & Young | New York City |
| Wellart Steamship Company (SS Selwyn Eddy) | Boston |

== Tanker operators ==
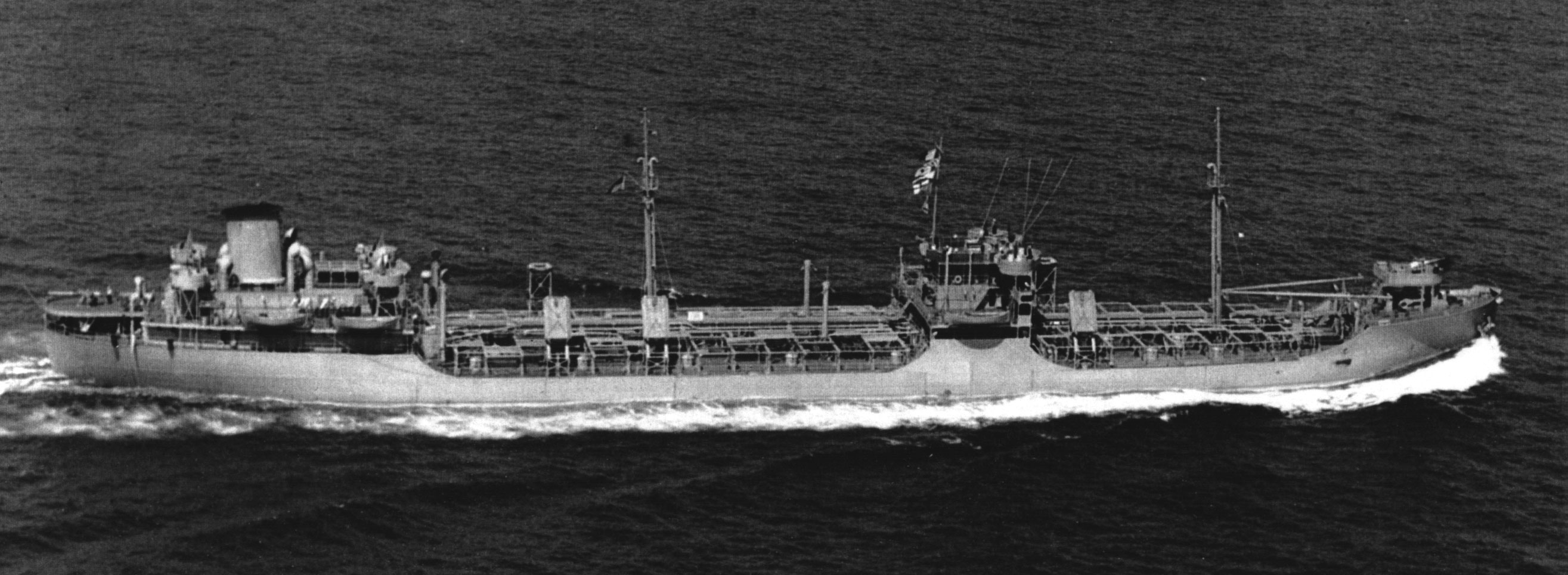
The T2 tanker Hat Creek in August 1943

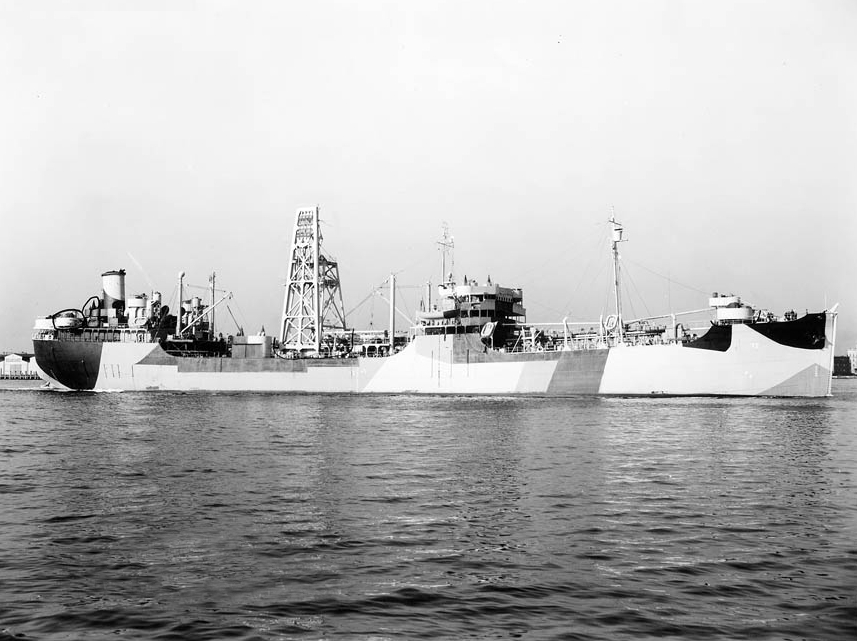
USS Niobrara, a T3 tanker

American steamship companies operating merchant tanker ships in World War II:

| 75 To 100 Tankers | |
|---|---|
| Standard Oil Company of New Jersey | New York City |

| 51 To 75 Tankers | |
|---|---|
| Pacific Tankers Inc. | San Francisco |
| War Emergency Tankers | New York City |

| 26 To 50 Tankers | |
|---|---|
| Deconhil Shipping Company | San Francisco |
| Gulf Oil Corporation | New York City |
| Keystone Shipping Company | Philadelphia |
| Los Angeles Tanker Operators | Los Angeles |
| Socony-Vacuum Oil Company | New York City |
| The Texas Company | New York City |

| 5 To 25 Tankers | |
|---|---|
| American Petroleum Transport Corporation | New York City |
| American Republics Corporation | Houston |
| American Trading & Production Corporation | New York City |
| Atlantic Refining Company | Philadelphia |
| Barber Asphalt Company | New York City |
| Bernuth-Lembcke Company | New York City |
| Cities Services Oil Company | New York City |
| National Bulk Carriers | New York City |
| Pan American Petroleum and Transport Company | New York City |
| Republic Oil Refining Company | Houston |
| Richfield Oil Corporation | Los Angeles |
| Sabine Transportation Company | Port Arthur |
| Sieling & Jarvis | New York City |
| Sinclair Refining Company | New York City |
| Spencer Kellogg & Sons, Inc. | New York City |
| Standard Oil Company of California | San Francisco |
| Sun Oil Company | Philadelphia |
| Tidewater Associated Oil Company | New York City |
| Union Oil Company | Los Angeles |

| 1 To 5 Ships | |
|---|---|
| Tankers Company (SS Lafcadio Hearn) | New York City |

== See also ==
- Merchant Marine Act of 1936
- James River, Reserve Fleet
- History of the United States Merchant Marine
- Awards and decorations of the United States Merchant Marine
- United States Maritime Service
- Merchant Navy (United Kingdom)
- Royal Fleet Auxiliary
- The Marine Society
- United States home front during World War II
