= W. R. Chamberlin & Company =

Former US Lumber and Shipping Company

W. P. Chamberlin & Company
- Industry: Lumber and shipping
- Founded: 1915 in San Francisco, California
- Key people: William Richmond Chamberlin; A. Lunny

W. R. Chamberlin & Company was a lumber and shipping company founded in 1915 by William Richmond Chamberlin in the Balboa Building in San Francisco, California. W. R. Chamberlin & Company main business was selling, brokering and shipping lumber and timber products from Portland, Oregon to the growing city of San Francisco and the San Francisco Bay area. By 1928 Chamberlin had four steamships to transport his lumber: the Barbara C, Phyllis, Stanwood, and W. R. Chamberlin, Jr. W. R. Chamberlin & Company was active in supporting the World War II efforts. W. R. Chamberlin & Company's ship the SS W.R. Chamberlin Jr put into service in the United States Navy and renamed USS Tackle (ARS-37). USS Tackle was damaged by an exploding mine on September 4, 1943 and too damaged to be repaired. Before founded W. P. Chamberlin & Company, Chamberlin Chamberlin was president of Byxbee & Clark Company, a lumber company in San Francisco.

== World War II ==
W. R. Chamberlin & Company fleet of ships were used to help the World War II effort. During World War II W. R. Chamberlin & Company operated Merchant navy ships for the United States Shipping Board. During World War II W. P. Chamberlin & Company was active with charter shipping with the Maritime Commission and War Shipping Administration. W. R. Chamberlin & Company operated Liberty ships and Victory ships for the merchant navy. The ship was run by its W. R. Chamberlin & Company crew and the US Navy supplied United States Navy Armed Guards to man the deck guns and radio.

== Ships ==
Ships owned:

- SS Barbara C, wooden lumber ship as SS Pacific, built in 1920 by Kruse & Banks Shipbuilding Co., North Bend, OR. prurchased for US Army on January 12, 1943. sank in 1946.
- SS Phyllis, built in 1917, wrecked - sank on March 9, 1936 on high seas, near Port Orford, Oregon.
- SS Stanwood
- SS W. R. Chamberlin, Jr. became USS Tackle (ARS-37), damaged by an exploding mine on September 4, 1943 and too damaged to be repaired.

Liberty ship of World War II

  - World War II operated:
  - Liberty Ships:
- SS Adoniram Judson
- SS Peter Skene Ogden, on Feb. 22, 1944 was torpedoed and damaged by German submarine U-969 off Algiers, damaged she beached and was later scrapped.
- SS John McLean
- SS Cyrus H. McCormick, torpedoed on April 18, 1945
- SS Peter Skene Ogden, torpedoed on Feb. 22, 1944

== See also ==
- World War II United States Merchant Navy
