= M & J Tracy Inc. =

Former US Shipping and tugboat Company

- Industry: tugboat towing, Transportation and shipping
- Founded: 1881 in New York City
- Defunct: 1983
- Key people: John Tracy; Michael J. Tracy; Thomas Tracy; Catherine Tracy; Helen Tracy; Maurice Tracy; Mary T. Tracy; Ellen Tracy; Nellie Tracy; Kate Tracy; Ella Tracy; Morris Tracy; Thos Tracy; Jon Tracy; Walter Tracy; Marie B Tracy; Doris Tracy; Ann M Tracy
- Subsidiaries: M & J Tracy Towing Line

M & J Tracy Inc. was a shipping and tugboat towing company founded in New York City by the Tracy brothers in 1881, as M & J Tracy Transportation company. The brothers: John Tracy, Michael J. Tracy and Thomas Tracy founded the Tracy Towing Line in 1917. The brother's sisters: Catherine Tracy and Helen Tracy were on the company's board. M & J Tracy Inc. office was located at 1 Broadway in New York City and had a field office in Brooklyn. The Tracy companies owned both owned tugboats and barges. Early work was transporting coal to New York Harbor port in barges. M & J Tracy Inc. supported the World War II effort by operating United States tugboats and ships. After the war, M & J Tracy Inc. purchased some surplus ships. M & J Tracy Inc. also operated the M & J Tracy New York Harbor Industrial site. The family lived in the Frank J. Helmle 1912 Tracy Mansion at 105 8th Avenue, Brooklyn, New York, now a 7 unit Condo. John Tracy founded the Maritime Association of the Port of New York. John Tracy was born in 1855 and died on October 1, 1931. Michael J, Tracy died on November 7, 1927,

== World War II ==
M & J Tracy Inc. tugboats and ships were used to help the World War II effort. During World War II T. M & J Tracy Inc. operated Merchant navy ships for the United States Shipping Board. During World War II M & J Tracy Inc. was active with charter shipping with the Maritime Commission and War Shipping Administration. M & J Tracy Inc. operated vessels for the merchant navy. The ship was run by its M & J Tracy Inc. crew and the US Navy supplied United States Navy Armed Guards to man the deck guns and radio.

== Vessels ==
  - World War II operated ships:
- M. & J. Tracy, Inc., built in 1917, by Great Lakes Engineering Works as SS Lakeland, 4,185 tons, operated from 1942 to 1947 for US during World War II.
- Charles L. O'Connor, operated from 1942 to 1947. Built in 1918 by Great Lakes Engineering Works.
- Maurice Tracy, built in 1916 by Great Lakes Engineering Works, sank June 17, 1944, after collision with SS Jesse Billingsley off Seaside Heights, New Jersey,

Liberty ship of World War II

  - Vessels owned:
- SS Craigsmere, built in 1919, purchased in 1927, scrapped in 1948
- SS Tracy Brothers, built by Merchant Shipbuilding, Chester, Pennsylvania in 1918, was SS Avondale and later SS Chas.Kurz, scrapped in 1948
- SS Thomas Tracy (1), built in 1916 at Great Lakes Engine Works, as SS Clinchwood, purchased in 1925, was also SS Begna and SS Condor. SS Thomas Tracy ran agrounded and wrecked at Cape Henlopen on the September 14, 1944.
- SS Michael Tracy, steamship, on February 5, 1927, had collision with the wooden steamship Cape Cod in Hell Gate, East River New York. The Cape Cod sank.
- M & J Tracy, tugboat, built in 1919, by Johnson Iron Works of New Orleans, Louisiana as the Degrey. Operated during World War II.
- William Tracy, tugboat 62 tons built in 1903 at Burlee Drydock Company in Port Richmond, Staten Island.
- Alfred P Brown, tugboat
- Walter Tracy, tugboat, 75 hp
- Helen L. Tracy, tugboat, built in 1953, by the Levingston Shipbuilding Company of Orange, Texas
- Kathleen C. Tracy, tugboat, built in 1956, by Levingston Shipbuilding (hull #556)
- Thomas Tracy, tugboat, built in 1956, by Levingston Shipbuilding
- William J. Tracy, tugboat, built in 1956, by Levingston Shipbuilding
- Mary T. Tracy, tugboat, built as Bison by Smith SB, in Sturgeon Bay WI
- SS Banner Seam, Liberty ships Collier, built in 1945, purchased in 1946, renamed Michael Tracy (2). In 1962 scrapped at Kearny, New Jersey.
- SS Herrin Seam, Liberty ships, built in 1945, purchased in 1946, renamed Thomas Tracy. Sold in 1962.
- Cape Lawrence, barge
- Reno, barge
- Herbert E. Smith, barge
- Cape Erwin, barge
- John Tracy, wooden Scow 230 tons built in 1895 at Burlee Drydock Company.
- Richard Crocker, Barge built in 1899 at Burlee Drydock Company.
- Jas. D. Perkins, Barge built in 1899 at Burlee Drydock Company.
- William J. Fransioli, Barge built in 1899 at Burlee Drydock Company.
- Reilly, Barge built in 1901 at Burlee Drydock Company.
- Washington, Alabama, Maryland, Kentucky, Nebraska, Montana, Mississippi, Missouri, Manitoba, and Mexico, 324 tons barges built in 1903 at Burlee Drydock Company.
- Maine, Vermont, Rhode Island, New Hampshire, Portland, and Hartford, 243 tons barges built in 1903 at Burlee Drydock Company.
- Alleghany, G.L. Douglass, Dakota, Michigan, Florida, Nevada, Delaware, Colorado, and California, 371 tons barges built in 1904 at Burlee Drydock Company.
- White Marsh, a Derrick barge, 80 tons, built in 1906 at Burlee Drydock Company.
- Cape May, Cape Ann, Cape Elizabeth, Cape Cod, and Cape Charles, 559 tons barges built in 1908 at Burlee Drydock Company.
- Cape Henry, Cape Sable, Cape Hatteras, Cape Lookout, an Cape Clear, 495 tons barges built in 1909 at Burlee Drydock Company.
- Cape Race, Cape York, Cape Farewell, Cape Romaine, and Cape Scott, 559 tons barges built in 1914 at Burlee Drydock Company.
- Staten Island, Long Island, Liberty Island, Governors Island, Fire Island, Shelter Island, Block Island, Glen Island, Cape Breton, Cape Comfort, 451 tons barges built in 1915 at Burlee Drydock Company.
- Cape Falcon, Cape Spencer and Oak Island, 457 tons barges built in 1916 at Burlee Drydock Company.
- Cape Caley, Cape ONeill, Cape Holcombe, Cape Maust, Cape D. Mallory, Cape Essex, Cape Kelly, and Cape Dennis, 457 tons barges built in 1947 at Bethlehem Staten Island.
- Cape Kearny, Cape Marion, Cape Astoria, Cape Sherman, Cape Sewaren, Cape Hanley, Cape Machold, Cape Moore, Cape Lenahan, Cape Donlin, Cape Fenelon, and Cape Doris, 885 tons barges built in 1948 at Bethlehem Staten Island.
- Cape Race, Cape Borer, Cape Todd, Sandy McKee, Cape Griffin, Cape Harrison and Cape Sable, 885 tons barges built in 1951 at Bethlehem Staten Island.
- M. & J. Tracy, Inc. built in 1926, sold in 1944, Official Number 225917.

== See also ==
- World War II United States Merchant Navy
- Type V ship, tugboats
