= USS Tackle =

History

United States
- Name: USS Tackle
- Builder: Newport News Shipbuilding and Drydock Company, Newport News, Virginia,
- Launched: 1912, as SS W.R. Chamberlain, Jr.
- Acquired: 1943
- Commissioned: 5 August 1943, as USS Tackle (ARS-37)
- Decommissioned: 13 September 1945
- Renamed: Tackle (ARS-37), 8 June 1943
- Reclassified: ARST-4 (Salvage Craft Tender), 1 February 1945; IX-217 (Miscellaneous Unclassified), 13 February 1945
- Stricken: 11 October 1945
- Honours and awards: 2 battle stars (WWII)

General characteristics
- Class & type: Tackle-class rescue and salvage ship
- Displacement: 6,500 long tons (6,604 t)
- Length: 310 ft 2 in (94.54 m)
- Beam: 44 ft 6 in (13.56 m)
- Draft: 22 ft 6 in (6.86 m)
- Propulsion: Diesel-electric, twin screws, 2,780 hp (2,073 kW)
- Speed: 10 knots (19 km/h; 12 mph)
- Complement: 65
- Armament: 1 × 3"/50 caliber gun; 2 × 20 mm guns

USS Tackle (ARS-37) was a Tackle-class rescue and salvage ship acquired by the U.S. Navy during World War II. She served in North Atlantic waters, and returned home at war's end with two battle stars.

== Acquisition for the war effort ==
Built as SS W. R. Chamberlain, Jr. in 1912 by the Newport News Shipbuilding and Drydock Co., Newport News, Virginia, the ship was owned and operated by the shipping company W. R. Chamberlin & Company. of Portland, Oregon.

The ship was acquired through the War Shipping Administration in 1943. She was renamed USS Tackle (ARS-37) on 8 June 1943; was taken over by the Navy at Oran, Algeria, on 19 June 1943; and commissioned on 5 August 1943 at Palermo, Sicily.

== World War II North Atlantic Operations ==
Tackle was assigned to the Salvage Force, U.S. 6th Fleet, and operated between Algerian ports until early 1944. She took a load of salvage equipment to Bizerte, Tunisia, on 30 March and moved to Palermo, Sicily, on 4 April. The ship shuttled between Sicily, Naples, and North African ports until mid-August.

== Invasion of southern France operations ==
Tackle sailed with Task Force 84, on 21 August, to participate in the landings in southern France. She arrived at Cavalaire-sur-Mer on the 24th and moved to Port-de-Bouc on 1 September.

== Damaged by an exploding mine ==
On 4 September, Tackle was being towed to the fueling and watering berth in the Basin Petrolier by the French tug Provencal. At 14:25 hours, a mine exploded between the two ships. The French tug was sunk, and Tackle suffered considerable damage to her port side and engine rooms. She was towed to Toulon on the 8th for temporary repairs and, five days later, thence to Palermo. Permanent repairs were completed there on 20 October, and she sailed for Toulon five days later.

Tackle made a voyage from Algeria to Marseille in November and spent December 1944 shuttling between Algerian ports. On 30 January 1945, she returned to Marseille. Her designation was changed to ARS(T)-4 (Salvage Craft Tender) on 1 February. The ship steamed to Palermo on the 13th. While she was there, her designation was changed to IX-217 (Miscellaneous Unclassified). She returned to Algeria on 20 March.

== Too damaged to remain in service ==
Tackle stood out of Oran on 17 April en route to the United States. She arrived at Norfolk, Virginia, on 18 May; and, on 27 June, it was determined that the ship was unfit for further naval service. Tackle was decommissioned on 13 September and struck from the Navy list on 11 October 1945. Her ultimate fate is unknown.

== Awards ==
Tackle received two battle stars for World War II service.
