= American Trading & Production Corporation =

Former Tanker Shipping Company

- Industry: tanker ships
- Founded: 1939 in New York City, United States
- Defunct: 2012
- Successor: Tema Oil and Gas LLC
- Subsidiaries: American Trading Transportation Co. Inc.

American Trading & Production Corporation was an American shipping company founded in New York City. It operated tanker ships and a few cargo ships.

During World War II the firm operated Merchant navy ships for the United States Shipping Board. During World War II it was active with charter shipping with the Maritime Commission and War Shipping Administration. It operated Liberty ships and tankers for the merchant navy. The ship was run by the company's crew and the US Navy supplied United States Navy Armed Guards to man the deck guns and radio.

In 1972, American Trading & Production Corporation founded a subsidiary, American Trading Transportation Co. Inc. with a fleet of six ships. One of them, the 82,030-ton American Trader, spilled 300,000 gallons of oil in 1990 off Huntington Beach, California. In 1986 American Trader collided with the tanker HJ Haynes in Long Beach.

In 2012 American Trading & Production Corporation became part of Tema Oil and Gas LLC of Houston, Texas. Tema Oil and Gas LLC products are: crude Petroleum, natural gas production and Oil and gas exploration

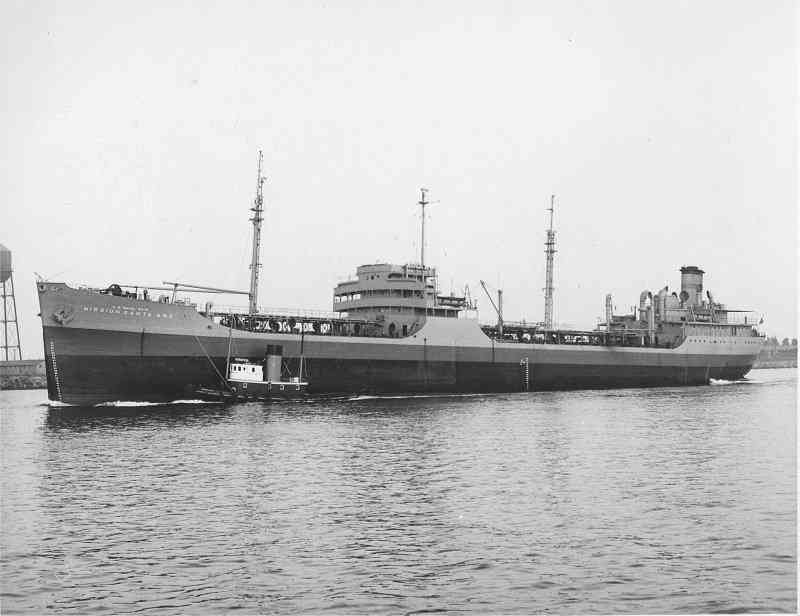
A T2 Tanker, named USNS Mission Santa Ana getting underway in Long Beach, California

Assembly and Construction of T2 Navy Tankers

== Ships ==
  - Post War T2 Tankers:
- Diamond Island
- Fisher's Hill
- Point Pleasant *
- Pit River *
- Marne
- Rum River *
- Harpers Ferry – later called Crown Trader
- Port Republic
- Buena Vista Hills
- San Juan Hill *
- Carnifax Ferry *
- Chatterton Hill *
- Mobile Bay
  - American Trading Transportation Co. Inc.: partial list of ships:
- Pennsylvania Trader
- Baltimore Trader
- American Trader
- American Trader (I), sank 1940
  - Liberty ships:
- Albert J. Berres *
- Alfred L. Baxley
- Anson Jones
- World War II only ship
  - Liberty ship:
- Albert G. Brown LibshipsA

== See also ==
- World War II United States Merchant Navy
