= Lyndon Baines Johnson Memorial Grove on the Potomac =

U.S. national memorial in Washington, D.C.

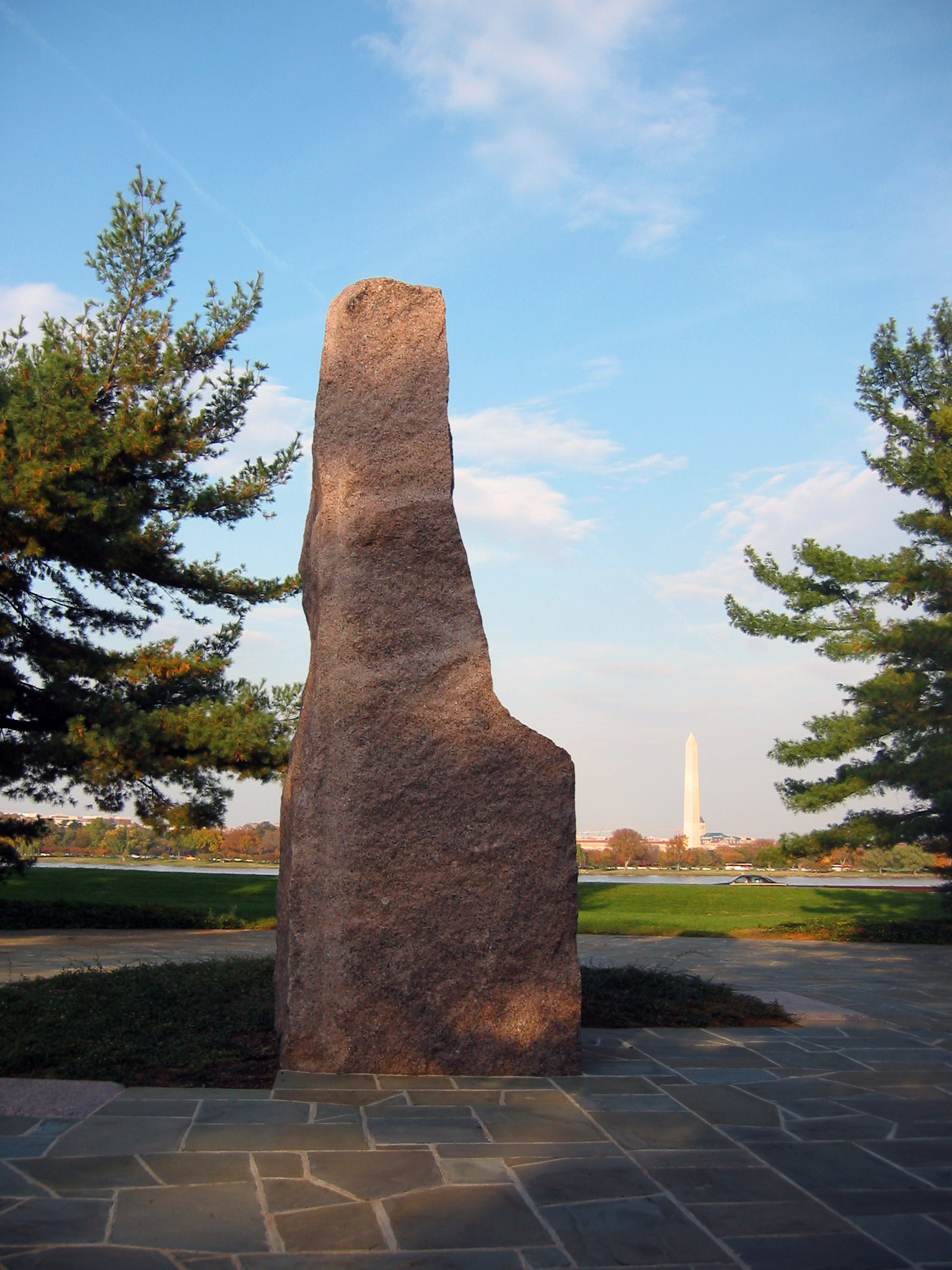
- LBJ Memorial Grove Monolith

- Location within Washington, D.C. Location within the United States
- Location: Washington, D.C., USA
- Coordinates: 38°52′43″N 77°3′5″W
- Area: 17 acres (6.9 ha)
- Established: December 28, 1973
- Visitors: 236,042 (in 2025)
- Governing body: National Park Service
- Website: LBJ Memorial Grove on the Potomac

Lyndon Baines Johnson Memorial Grove on the Potomac is located on Lady Bird Johnson Park (formerly known as Columbia Island), in Washington, D.C. The presidential memorial honors the 36th President of the United States, Lyndon B. Johnson.

The grove consists of two parts. The first area, commemorative in nature, is a Texas granite monolith surrounded by a serpentine pattern of walks and trails. The second area is a grass meadow and provides a tranquil refuge for reflection and rejuvenation of the spirit. The trails are shaded by a grove of hundreds of white pine and dogwood trees, and framed by azaleas and rhododendron. The memorial overlooks the Potomac River with a vista of the city of Washington.

Visitors may listen to a recording made by Lady Bird Johnson at the entrance to the park facing The Pentagon. In the recording, the former First Lady talks about the creation of the park, the trees, and the views of major Washington, D.C., landmarks.

== History ==
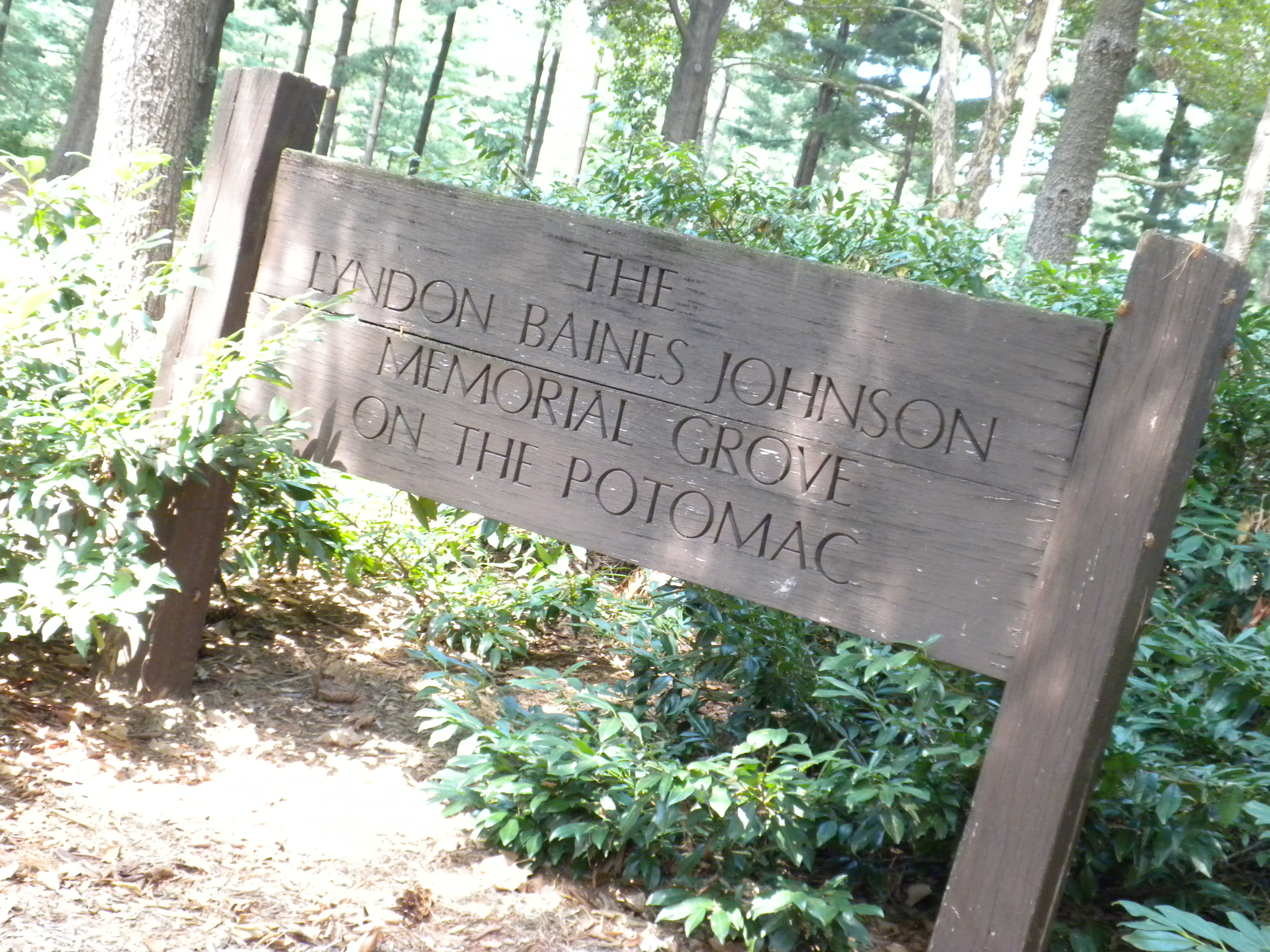
Entrance to the memorial grove

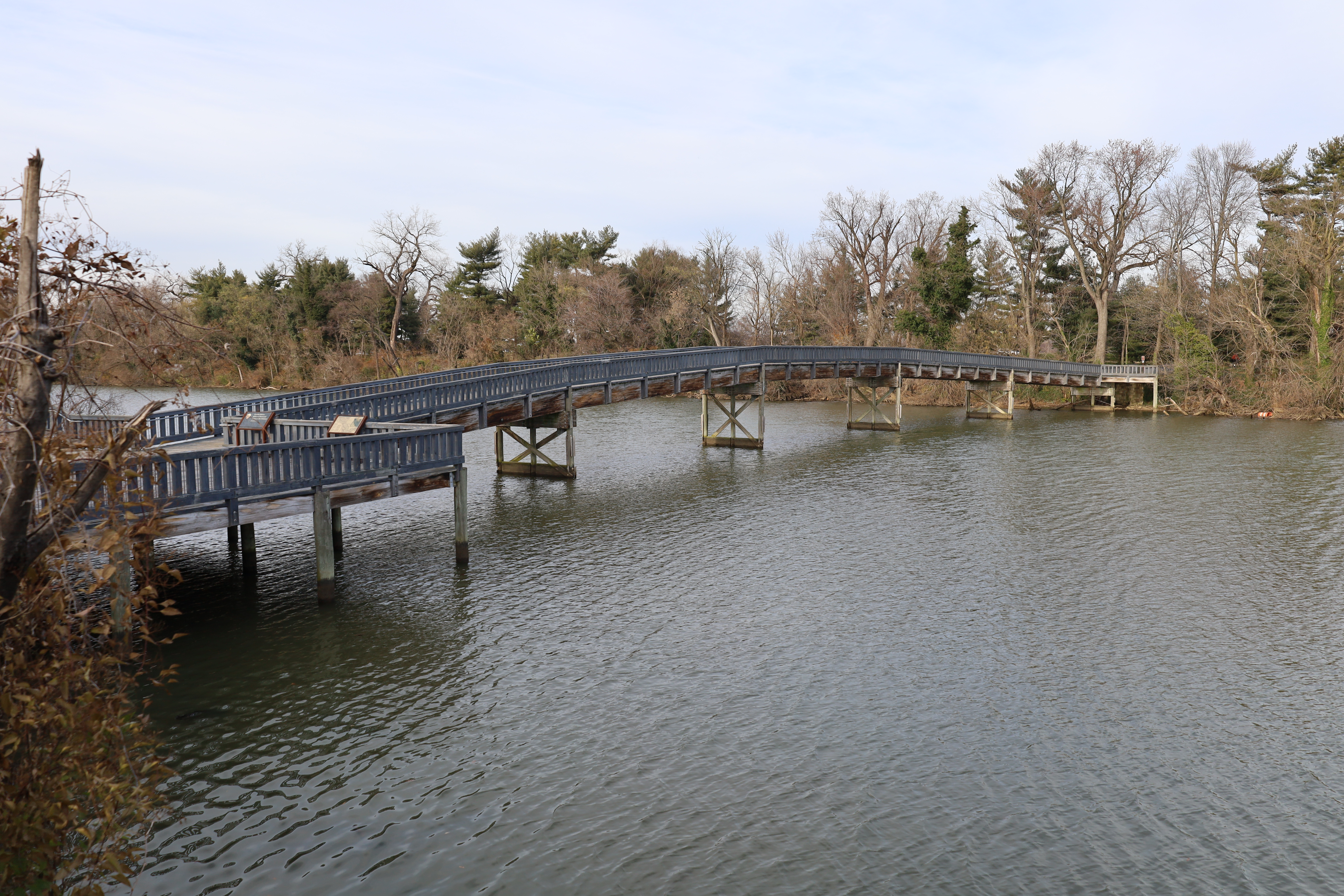
Footbridge across Boundary Channel connecting the Grove to the Pentagon grounds

Former President Lyndon B. Johnson died on January 22, 1973. Soon after, Johnson's admirers proposed constructing a statue in Washington, D.C., in his memory, but concern that it would be defaced led to rejection of that idea. Brooke Astor and Laurence Vanderbilt suggested a grove of trees instead, and planning for the $2 million grove began in Spring 1973. Lady Bird Johnson Park was chosen as the site of the grove due to Johnson's love of the park and its panoramic views of Washington, D.C., and its monuments on the National Mall and elsewhere while he was president.

The national memorial was authorized by Congress on December 28, 1973, and administratively listed on the National Register of Historic Places the same day.

By February 1975, $1.3 million for the memorial grove had been raised. A $15 silver medal and a $350 gold medal were designed in early 1975 and sold to help raise another $150,000. Plans for the grove were largely complete by May 1975. Landscape architect Meade Palmer designed the grove, which included a contemplative meadow and a small granite plaza among some trees. The grove covered 15 acres (61,000 m^{2}), and would be planted with white pine, dogwood trees, and flowering shrubs and bushes. A granite plaza was intended for the center of the grove, on which a 45-short-ton (41 t), 19-foot (5.8 m) high pink granite orthostat (or "standing stone") quarried in Texas was to be placed. Stone carver Harold Vogel worked the exterior of the stone to give it a dynamic, rough-hewn look reminiscent of Johnson's personality. The Department of Geological Sciences at the University of Texas estimated the rock's age at a billion years. A flagstone walkway winding through the grove was included in the design. Four quotes from Johnson's public speeches, selected by Lady Bird Johnson, were carved into flagstones placed around the orthostat. But $600,000 was still needed in May 1975 to complete the memorial.

The orthostat was delivered to the site in August 1974, and emplaced on August 13, 1975. In December 1975, Congress authorized $1 million to complete the memorial grove and establish a maintenance fund.

The memorial was dedicated on April 6, 1976. It is administered by the National Park Service, as part of the George Washington Memorial Parkway.

A $500,000 footbridge between the memorial and a 30-car parking lot along Boundary Channel was constructed to make it easier to visit the Grove. The bridge was designed by landscape architect Meade Palmer and dedicated by Lady Bird Johnson on October 12, 1977.

During the September 11th attack on the Pentagon, employees from the Pentagon and the Pentagon's daycare center evacuated the 167 children present that day to LBJ Park; some were picked up there by their parents, those who weren't picked up there were transported to a Virginia Department of Transportation center, where they were reunited with their parents.

== See also ==
- List of national memorials of the United States
- Presidential memorials in the United States
