= Columbia Island (Washington, D.C.) =

Island in Washington, D.C.

Lady Bird Johnson park (Columbia)
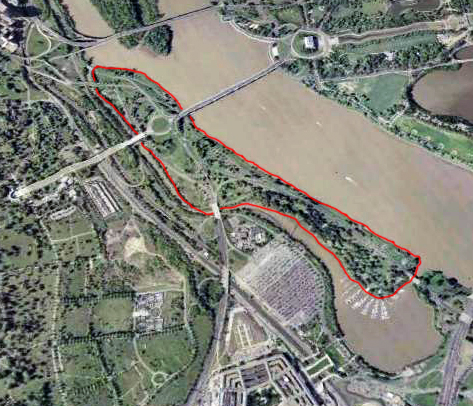
- Aerial view of the island (outlined in red)
- Interactive map of Lady Bird Johnson park (Columbia)

Geography
- Location: Potomac River, Washington, D.C., U.S.
- Coordinates: 38°52′56″N 77°03′26″W
- Total islands: 1
- Area: 0.19 sq mi (0.49 km^{2})
- Length: 1.32 mi (2.12 km)
- Coastline: 2.95 mi (4.75 km)
- Highest elevation: 22 ft (6.7 m)

Administration
- United States

Demographics
- Population: 0

Columbia Island, officially also known as the Lady Bird Johnson Park since 1968, is an island located in the Potomac River in Washington, D.C., in the United States. It formed naturally as an extension of Analostan Island in the latter part of the 1800s, and over time, erosion and flooding severed it from the Analostan island, now known as Theodore Roosevelt Island.

The U.S. federal government deposited material dredged from the Potomac River on the island between 1911 and 1922, and again from 1925 to 1927. The island was also reshaped by the government at this time "to serve as the western terminus of Arlington Memorial Bridge and a symbolic entrance into the nation’s capital." Located within the park are the Lyndon Baines Johnson Memorial Grove, Navy – Merchant Marine Memorial, and the Columbia Island Marina. The island, park, memorials, and marina are part of the George Washington Memorial Parkway and administered by the National Park Service.

== History ==
=== Early formation of Columbia Island ===
Columbia Island is in part natural, and in part man-made. Columbia Island did not exist in 1818 and at that time, Analostan Island (now known as Theodore Roosevelt Island) was largely a rock and quite close to the Washington D.C. shoreline. Due to deforestation and increased agricultural use upstream, the river eroded much of the northern bank and widened the gap between Analostan Island and the shore and simultaneously large deposits of silt built up around Analostan Island. By 1838, Analostan had almost doubled in length toward the south and by 1884, the new southern part of Analostan Island was defined and built up, and supported a well-established wetland. However, the river gradually eroded the center of Analostan Island, severing Columbia Island from its parent body.

Between 1911 and 1922, the Potomac River was repeatedly dredged to deepen the channel and to widen the distance between Analostan/Theodore Roosevelt Island and Columbia Island (so that the "Virginia Channel" west of Analostan/Roosevelt Island would not flood easily). Dredged material was piled high on Columbia Island, helping to build it higher, lengthen and broaden it, and give it its current shape. Filling in of the island was complete in the spring of 1924.

The new island received its name in about 1918 from an unnamed engineer working for the District of Columbia and the first use of this name in The Washington Post was in April 1922, the same year it was transferred to the National Park Service.

=== Development ===
==== Arlington Memorial Bridge and the expansion of Columbia Island ====
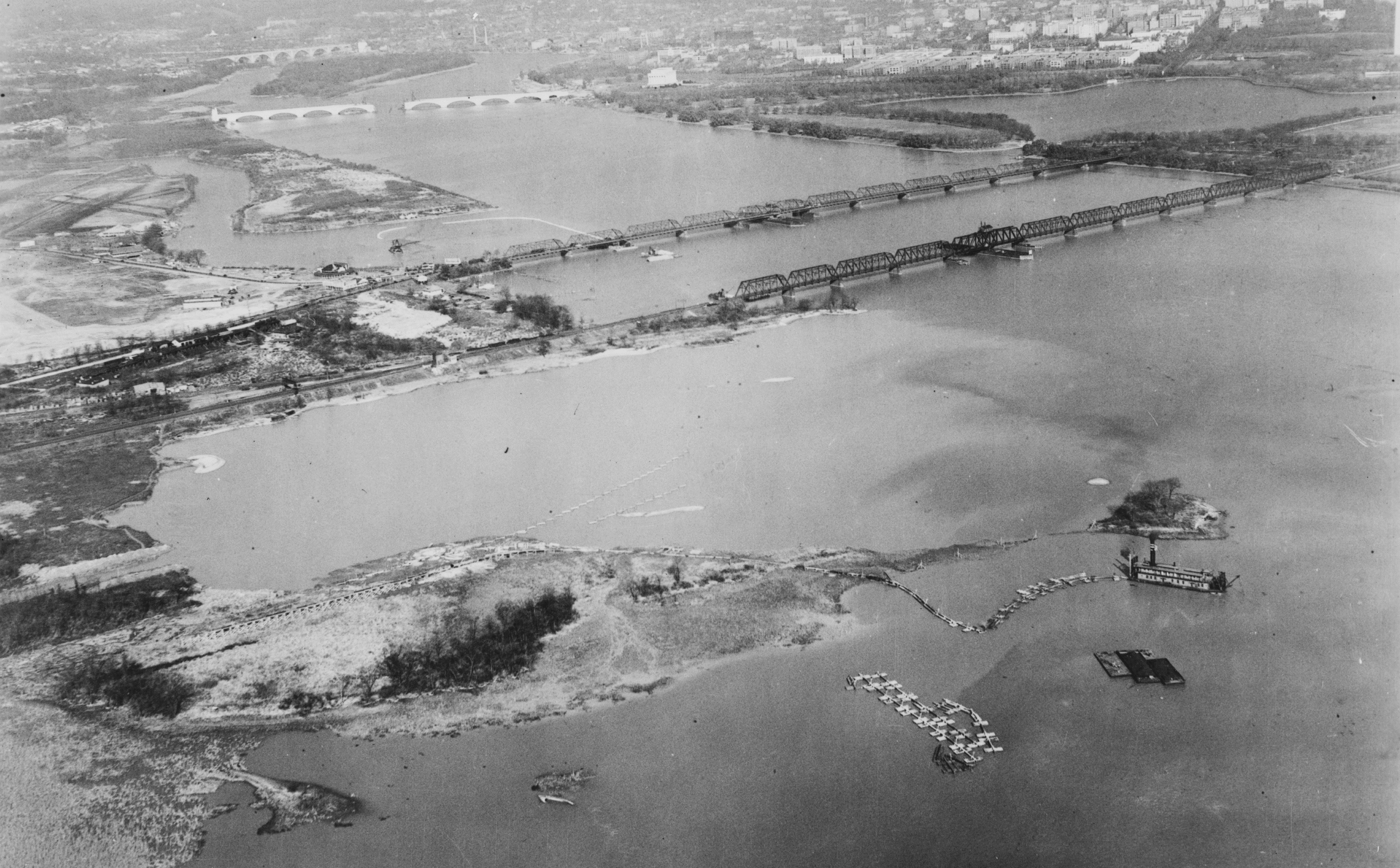
Dredging operations in the Potomac River and the land utilized for Pentagon Lagoon and the bascule span in Arlington Memorial Bridge in 1930

In 1922, the United States Congress authorized the Arlington Memorial Bridge Commission (AMBC) to hold a design competition for the proposed Arlington Memorial Bridge. It awarded the design commission to the firm of McKim, Mead and White, which appointed architect William Mitchell Kendall to be the lead designer. Congress subsequently authorized construction of Kendall's bridge on February 24, 1925. The legislation authorizing construction of the bridge also provided for the construction of approaches (on-ramps, off-ramps, and pedestrian areas) on both the D.C. and Virginia ends of the bridge; for the improvement of B Street NW as a new ceremonial avenue to link to the bridge; and for the construction of a roadway (eventually called Memorial Drive) between the bridge and the main gate of Arlington National Cemetery as well as a new ceremonial entrance at this gate (subsequently known as the Hemicycle).

Preliminary designs for the bridge showed it terminating on Columbia Island, which necessitated expansion of Columbia Island. The United States Army Corps of Engineers already planned to dredge the Potomac River and enlarge Columbia Island, so on April 1, Secretary of War John W. Weeks ordered the expenditure of $114,500 to dredge the river between the Highway Bridge and the Lincoln memorial. The dredged material was to be dumped on Columbia Island. To ensure the island could support the bridge, the Corps also planned to construct a 20-foot (6.1 m) levee around the island.

The Corps reached an agreement with the AMBC in April 1925 to jointly share the cost of dredging, which involved the removal of 2.5 million cubic feet (71,000 m^{3}) of river bottom, and the construction of 2,000 feet (610 m) of seawall and 15,000 feet (4,600 m) of levee. About 40 acres (160,000 m^{2}) of Columbia Island was to be removed in order to widen the main Potomac River channel, and the height of the island raised from 6 feet (1.8 m) above average water level to 22 feet (6.7 m) over two years.

==== Early designs for Columbia Island ====
In addition to the ABMC and Corps of Engineers, the United States Commission of Fine Arts (CFA) and the National Capital Parks Commission (NCPC) both had authority to approve aspects of the bridge. The CFA had extensive authority to review the look of the bridge.

The CFA and NCPC first discussed the bridge approaches in January 1926, when they met jointly to discuss how the Virginia terminus would serve as a gateway to Washington. The two bodies agreed to a proposal by urban planner C.A.S. Sinclair, who proposed a series of roads radiating outward from the Virginia end of the bridge. However, in December 1926, the CFA learned that Arlington National Cemetery was likely to expand eastward onto the property of the USDA Experimental Farm (which lay east of Arlington Ridge Road). Because this significantly impacted the approaches to the bridge, the CFA asked Kendall to restudy Sinclair's proposal for the Columbia Island terminus. Kendall presented the revised design for the street and highway approaches for the Virginia landing in May 1927. His plan was for a series of traffic circles on Columbia Island.

By June 30, 1927, dredging of the Potomac River was nearly complete. The reshaping of Columbia Island was finished, and the 200-acre (810,000 m^{2}) island had risen to 22 feet (7 m) feet above water. The following month, work began on the engineering and architectural drawings for the Boundary Channel Bridge. This bridge would cross Boundary Channel (which separated Columbia Island from Virginia) to connect Arlington Memorial Bridge with the planned Memorial Drive.

Kendall's May 1927 design for Columbia Island generated lengthy debate for two years. Architect Milton Bennett Medary (who left the CFA in 1927) wrote to the Commission of Fine Arts in January 1928 after having seen Kendall's proposal. Medary argued that the National Mall ended with the Lincoln Memorial and the two great roads leading from it – the Rock Creek and Potomac Parkway (RCPP) and the Arlington Memorial Bridge. Columbia Island, he said, should reflect a simple, formal dignity that helps ease the transition from the Neoclassical mall and bridge to the informal landscaping of Arlington National Cemetery. Medary's argument proved persuasive to the CFA, and in late May the commission and Kendall announced a revised treatment in which a great plaza would be built on Columbia Island. From this plaza, roads would lead across the island to bridges which would connect with the proposed Mount Vernon Memorial Parkway and Lee Highway. The traffic circles were eliminated, and Columbia Island would be reshaped to allow for the north–south roadway to pass along the axis of the island. The great plaza was intended to contain two 166-foot (51 m) high columns representing the Union and the South. The two columns were to be surmounted by gold statues of Nike. Additionally, the CFA concluded that there should be two 40-foot (12 m) high pylons at both the eastern and western ends of the bridge. These pylons were to be inscribed with bas-relief images representing national accomplishments, and topped by statues of golden eagles. Kendall's design also included two large, round Greek Revival temples close to the bridge on the island's east side, and several larger-than-life Greek Revival and Romanesque Revival statues scattered about the island.

==== Early construction: Boundary Channel Bridge ====
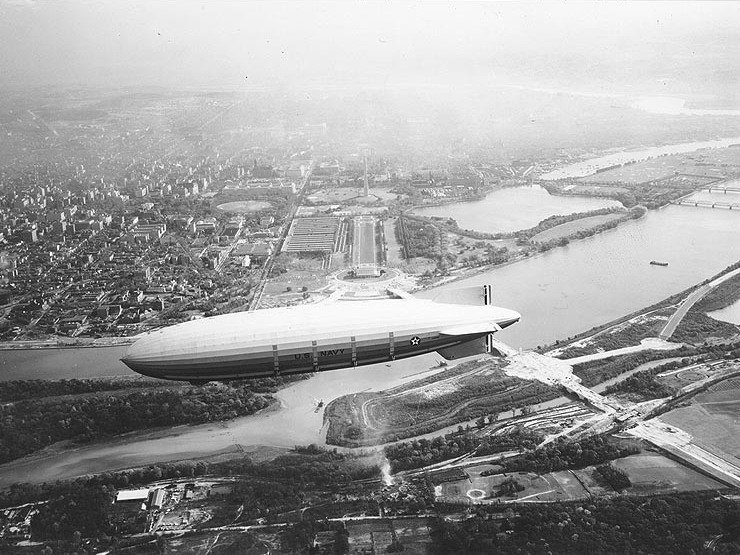
The dirigible USS Akron flies over Columbia Island in 1931. Below and to the right of the airship's tailfins is the island, on which extensive construction is under way on the "great plaza", axial roads, Boundary Channel Bridge, and Memorial Drive. Note the lack of any bridges to the north (left in this image).

Bids for the construction of the Boundary Channel Bridge were opened on July 18, 1928. The project was divided among several contractors. North Carolina Granite Co. provided the below-water granite, Hallowell Granite Works provided the granite for the voussoirs and the facing on the piers 10 feet (3.0 m) above mean low water level. The Woodbury Granite Company provided the coping granite and balustrades. Hallowell delivered its granite in May 1929, North Carolina Granite delivered its by June, and Woodbury Granite delivered roughly half its granite by June 30, 1929. The construction contract itself was awarded to the N.P. Severin Company in October 1928.

Nearly a year passed before the CFA approved pylon designs for Columbia Island in March 1929. But the great plaza and roads on the island needed further study.

Work on the Boundary Channel Bridge began in the spring of 1929, but immediately ran into problems. An unstable rock shelf 13 feet (4.0 m) thick lay under the western abutment of the Arlington Memorial Bridge. This "rotten rock" had not been revealed by borings two years earlier, but now came to light as construction began on the Boundary Channel Bridge. Additionally, a thin layer of sand and gravel was discovered lying atop the bedrock of the eastern abutment of the Boundary Channel Bridge. Both obstacles had to be removed before construction could proceed further. By June 30, 1929, the Arlington Memorial Bridge's western abutment was finished (except for exterior masonry facing), and many of the concrete columns for the Boundary Channel Bridge were also finished.

By the end of June 1930, some additional filling in of Columbia Island was all that was needed to finish the Arlington Memorial Bridge. But no construction had occurred on the Columbia Island great plaza, its monumental columns, or the two pylons as the CFA had still not approved a final design for these. Additionally, work on the western half of the Boundary Channel Bridge had come to a standstill. Tracks of the Rosslyn Branch of the Pennsylvania Railroad ran along the Virginia shoreline. In order to avoid an at-grade crossing with Memorial Drive, the CFA proposed in June 1927 that these tracks be lower by 20 feet (6.1 m). Since that meant extending the Boundary Channel Bridge, new engineering studies of the bridge were needed. The Corps and CFA were still studying how to depress the Pennsylvania Railroad tracks three years later. Informal negotiations had, by the end of June 1930, come to an agreement that the line would be moved closer to the river, and that an underpass through the bridge (accommodating two side-by-side tracks) and the depressed tracks should be constructed first before the railroad took title to the new line. This would permit uninterrupted rail service. The Pennsylvania Railroad also agreed to cede the old right-of-way to the government once the new tracks and tunnel were operational. Otherwise, construction on the Boundary Channel Bridge was complete.

==== Revisions to the Great Plaza ====
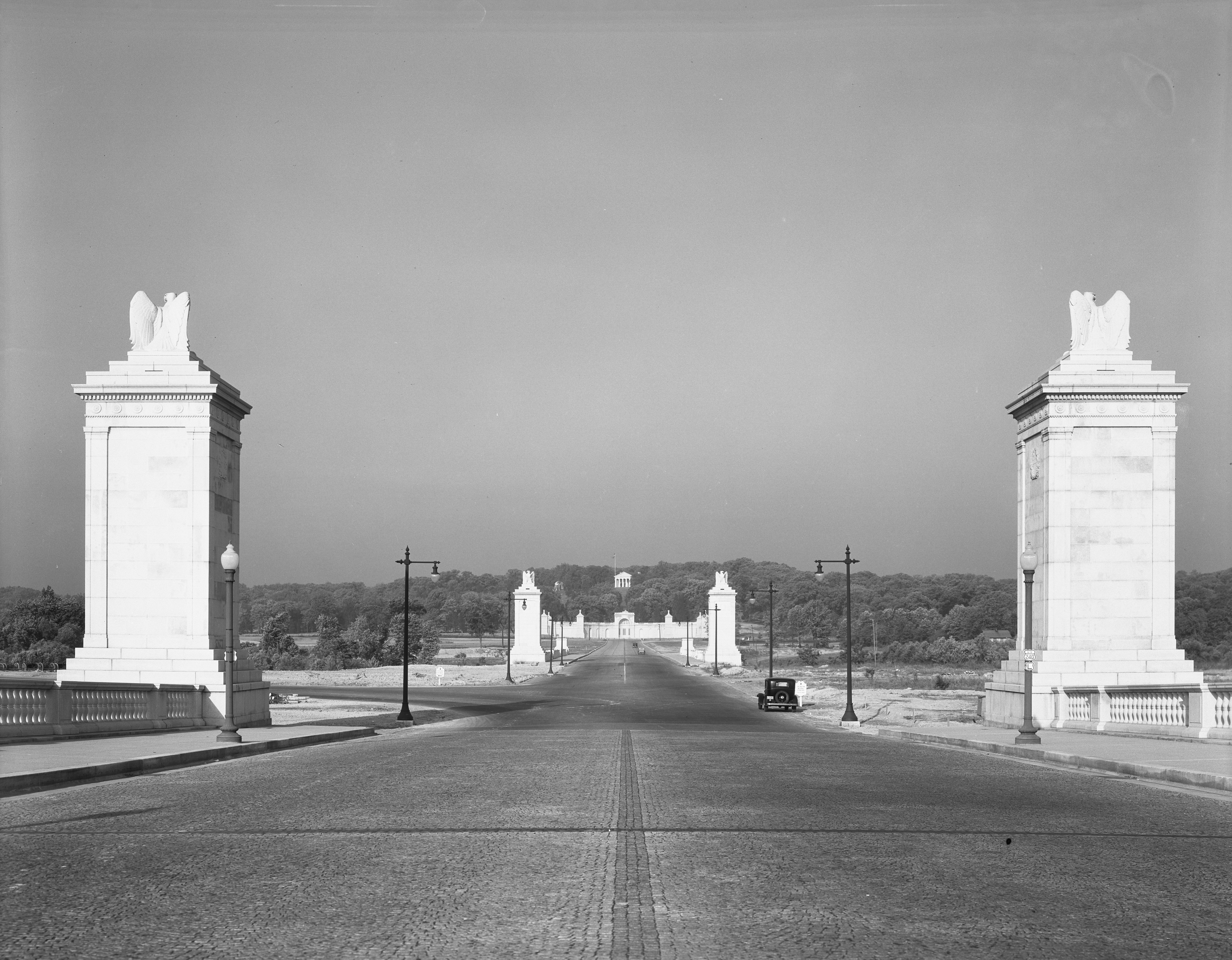
Northern end of Columbia Island shortly after its completion in 1932. The only roads visible are the connecting central axis road to the George Washington Memorial Parkway (left) and the Boundary Channel Bridge (showing completed and incomplete pylons) to Memorial Drive and Arlington National Cemetery in the distance.

The CFA again considered designs for the Columbia Island plaza in July 1930. Repairs to the levees on Columbia Island were made that same month. In September, the CFA reviewed but did not approve designs for the memorial columns, and for additional landscaping on the island. CFA members began to question whether the columns were effective in memorializing the reunited North and South, although there was still agreement that they were integral to the great plaza's design. Nonetheless, Kendall was asked to restudy the issue yet again. Additionally, by now the Great Depression was having a severe and negative impact on funding for the entire Arlington Memorial Bridge project. With the bridge and its connection to Arlington National Cemetery essentially finished, Congress hesitated to provide funds for Columbia Island. To cut costs, the CFA deleted the Greek Revival temples and the many statues scheduled for Columbia Island. Rather than building extensive roads north and south on the island when no connections were ready to be made, the CFA also agreed that only short segments of these avenues be built adjacent to the great plaza. Eliminating the statuary on the island and on the Boundary Channel Bridge saved $478,000.

Due to settling, additional dredged material was deposited on Columbia Island in October and November 1930. The new goal was to raise the island to 30 feet (9.1 m) above the average water level.

There were still problems in designing the final segment of Boundary Channel Bridge in November 1930, but the road across Columbia Island connecting Arlington Memorial Bridge with Boundary Channel Bridge was finished in December.

The CFA continued to wrestle with Columbia Island's great plaza design in 1931. The commission again discussed the columns in January, and eliminated a granite balustrade around the great plaza (saving $400,000). But by September, the agency still had come to no resolution on redesigning the plaza.

==== Eliminating the memorial columns ====
Design issues surrounding the Columbia Island great plaza were resolved in late 1931 not by the CFA, but by President Herbert Hoover. Two airfields, Hoover Field and Washington Airport, existed in Virginia just south of Columbia Island. In the spring of 1931, AMBC executive officer Ulysses S. Grant III (then a lieutenant colonel with the Corps of Engineers) advised the AMBC and CFA that the huge memorial columns planned for Columbia Island would be a risk to aviation. Both bodies ignored him however.

On September 28, 1931, the United States Department of Commerce told the CFA that the tall columns were a risk to aviation. The Commerce Department said that the columns would seriously interfere with air traffic using Hoover Field, and demanded that the CFA either eliminate the columns or floodlight them brightly. The Washington Board of Trade added its opposition to the columns on September 29. Grant agreed that, should an investigation show a hazard, the columns would have to be eliminated. The CFA agreed that street lights should be placed alongside the roads on Columbia Island both as an aid to vehicular traffic and as a means of warning air traffic. But the CFA was adamantly opposed to floodlighting the memorial columns, for they would compete with the softer lighting illuminating the Lincoln Memorial and Arlington House in Arlington National Cemetery. William Kendall, however, was so adamant about retaining the memorial columns that he personally wrote President Hoover (who technically chaired the AMBC) in early October 1931 outlining his reasons for keeping the columns and telling Hoover to move the airport if they interfered with flight.

On October 12, Hoover ordered AMBC staff, Kendall, the CFA, and Arlington Memorial Bridge consulting engineer W. J. Douglas to restudy the columns. The Washington Post reported that several AMBC and CFA members, as well as member of Congress, were increasingly worried as well about the huge cost of the columns. The columns themselves were estimated to cost at least $500,000, with another $100,000 needed for their foundations. The CFA took up the issue at its regular meeting in early November. But when CFA members expressed skepticism about the issue, Senator Hiram Bingham (an aviation enthusiast) began organizing aviation interests to oppose them. Bingham also threatened to introduce legislation in Congress to bar any aviation hazards from being erected in the D.C. area. On November 27, 40 postal and air transport pilots wrote to President Hoover demanding that the pillars be eliminated. Three days later, the Board of Trade also contacted Hoover directly to lobby against the columns' erection.

Faced with overwhelming opposition, the AMBC voted to eliminate the columns in December 1931, and asked Kendall for yet another new design for Columbia Island. In the wake of the AMBC's decision, proposals came from the public and architects outside the project to add either high-spouting fountains or towers which would retract whenever planes took off from the airports. But no decision was made.

==== Completion of Columbia Island ====
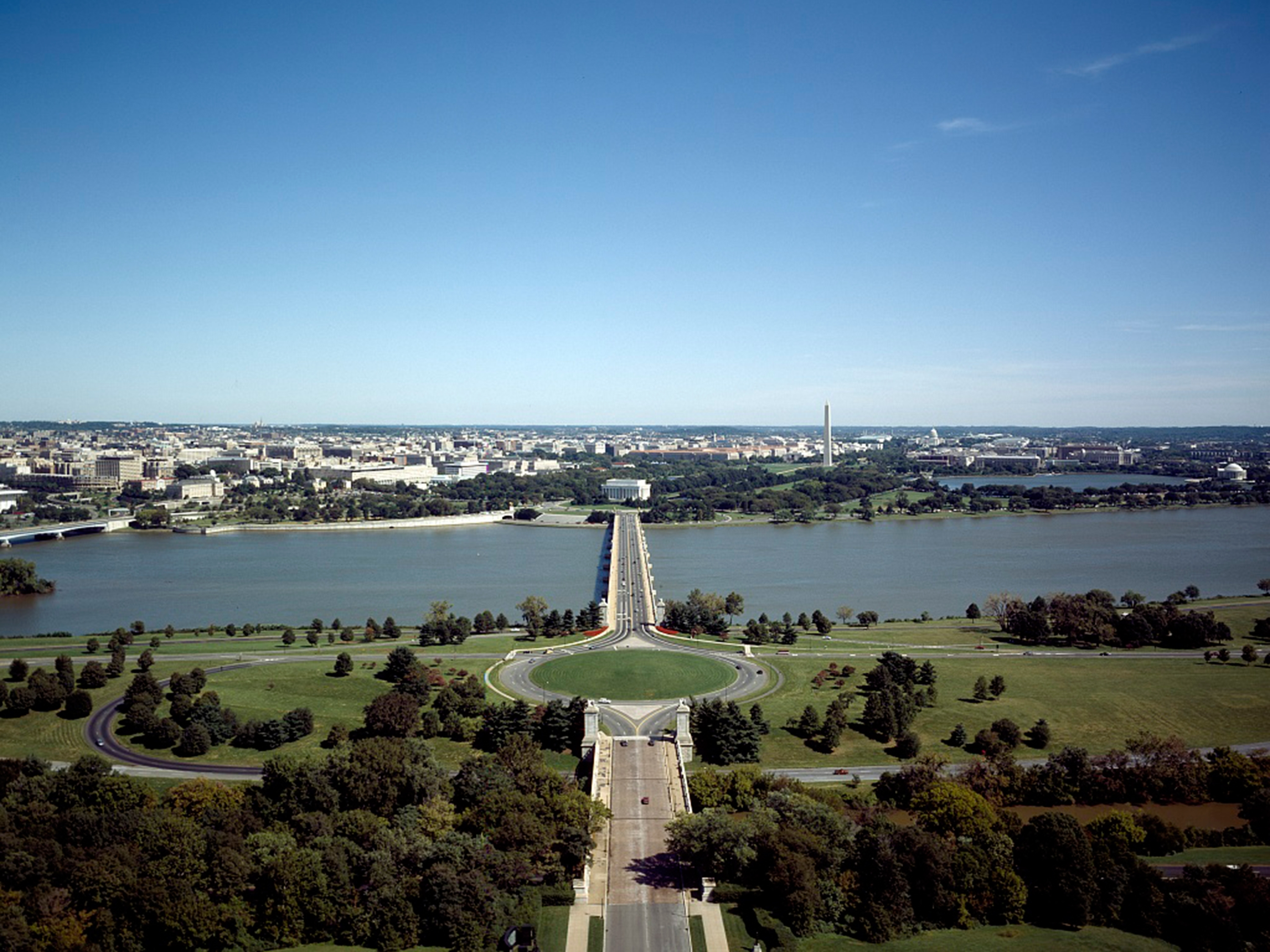
Aerial view of Columbia Island in 2011: The unfinished "great plaza" is at the foot of Arlington Memorial Bridge; northbound George Washington Memorial Parkway skirts the far (eastern) side of the island; the "racetrack" feature is visible circling the island; southbound George Washington Memorial Parkway skirts the near (western) side of the island; and Boundary Channel Bridge (with memorial pylons) spanning the silt-laden, brown Boundary Channel, is toward the bottom of the image.

By April 1932, work was well under way on relocating the Pennsylvania Railroad tracks. The new, slightly shifted route had been graded, tracks laid, and the western end of Boundary Channel Bridge designed. While there were some delays in completing the railroad underpass, work was well advanced. The formal dedication of the Hemicycle, Memorial Avenue, and Boundary Channel Bridge occurred on April 9. Colonel Ulysses S. Grant III, executive director of the Arlington Memorial Bridge Commission and an officer in the Corps of Engineers, formally opened Memorial Avenue and the Boundary Channel Bridge. (Memorial Avenue was only 30 feet [9 m] wide and unpaved, but the Corps was working to have it widened to 60 feet [18 m] and have it paved by July 1.)

The worsening federal budgetary situation nearly led to a complete halt in Columbia Island's development. On April 7, 1932, the House of Representatives deleted the project's entire $840,000 budget for fiscal year 1933 (which began July 1, 1932). Design and other work on the great plaza came to an immediate halt. So did the Corps' final push to fill in the island, as well as all landscaping and road grading. The CFA met in November 1932 to discuss how the incomplete work might be fixed to appear complete or become functional.

Franklin D. Roosevelt took office as President of the United States in March 1933. Convinced that massive federal spending on public works was essential not only to "prime the pump" of the economy but also to cut unemployment, Roosevelt proposed passage of the National Industrial Recovery Act. The act contained $6 billion in public works spending. The act passed on June 13, 1933, and Roosevelt signed it into law on June 16. The Public Works Administration (PWA) was immediately established to disburse the funds appropriated by the act.

On July 13, just a month after the PWA was formed, the agency announced a $3 million grant to finish work on Columbia Island and other parts of the Arlington Memorial Bridge project. The CFA and NCPC met in November to decide how to proceed on Columbia Island, which had only one link to Virginia – and that led only to Arlington National Cemetery. On December 4, the agencies announced that PWA money would be used to construct bridges on the north and south ends of the island in anticipation of links with Lee Highway and a new highway the state of Virginia and Arlington County were discussing constructing in the south. (The southern bridge carrying the parkway became known as the Humpback Bridge because it had a slight rise in its center.) To connect to these bridges, completion of the roads on Columbia Island was also needed. These roads were staked out in January 1934, and the CFA and NCPC began discussing whether a new, large traffic circle should be added to the center of the island to replace the bottleneck that a simple cross-axis would be. The engineering and architectural design for the northern bridge was approved in October 1936.

The CFA further discussed what to do with the Columbia Island great plaza in January 1935, but again could come to no decision. Without funds, little action other than bridge construction or marginal improvements could be made. Improved landscaping designs for the Boundary Channel Bridge were also submitted in January 1935, and approved in March 1936. Seven months later, the CFA began studying the design for the lighting scheme for the Arlington Memorial Bridge, Columbia Island, and Memorial Drive.

Minor elements of Columbia Island were completed in the last years of the 1930s. A second northern bridge, designed to link with Arlington Boulevard (then known as Lee Boulevard) was approved in 1937. The Joseph A. LaVezza & Sons construction company immediately began work on the $24,875 bridge. This new bridge, and (at last) the bridge over the Pennsylvania Railroad tracks were completed in July. Although the CFA continued to confer on plans concerning the great plaza as late as January 1938, no improvements were made. Memorial Avenue was completed in September 1938.

The final elements on Columbia Island were constructed in 1939 and 1940. In April 1939, Congress approved $100,000 to build the last connections between the bridges and central traffic circle on the island, as well as build sidewalks, trails, and parking lots and to improve landscaping there. The CFA, after four years of deliberation, finally approved the lamppost design for the island in January 1940. The last major improvement to the island came in September 1940, when a "racetrack" feature – a larger outer traffic circle – was constructed to handle the rapidly increasing north–south traffic on the island. This permitted north–south motorists to avoid the bottleneck at the traffic circle (which now largely handled just east–west traffic).

=== Later history of Columbia Island until renaming ===
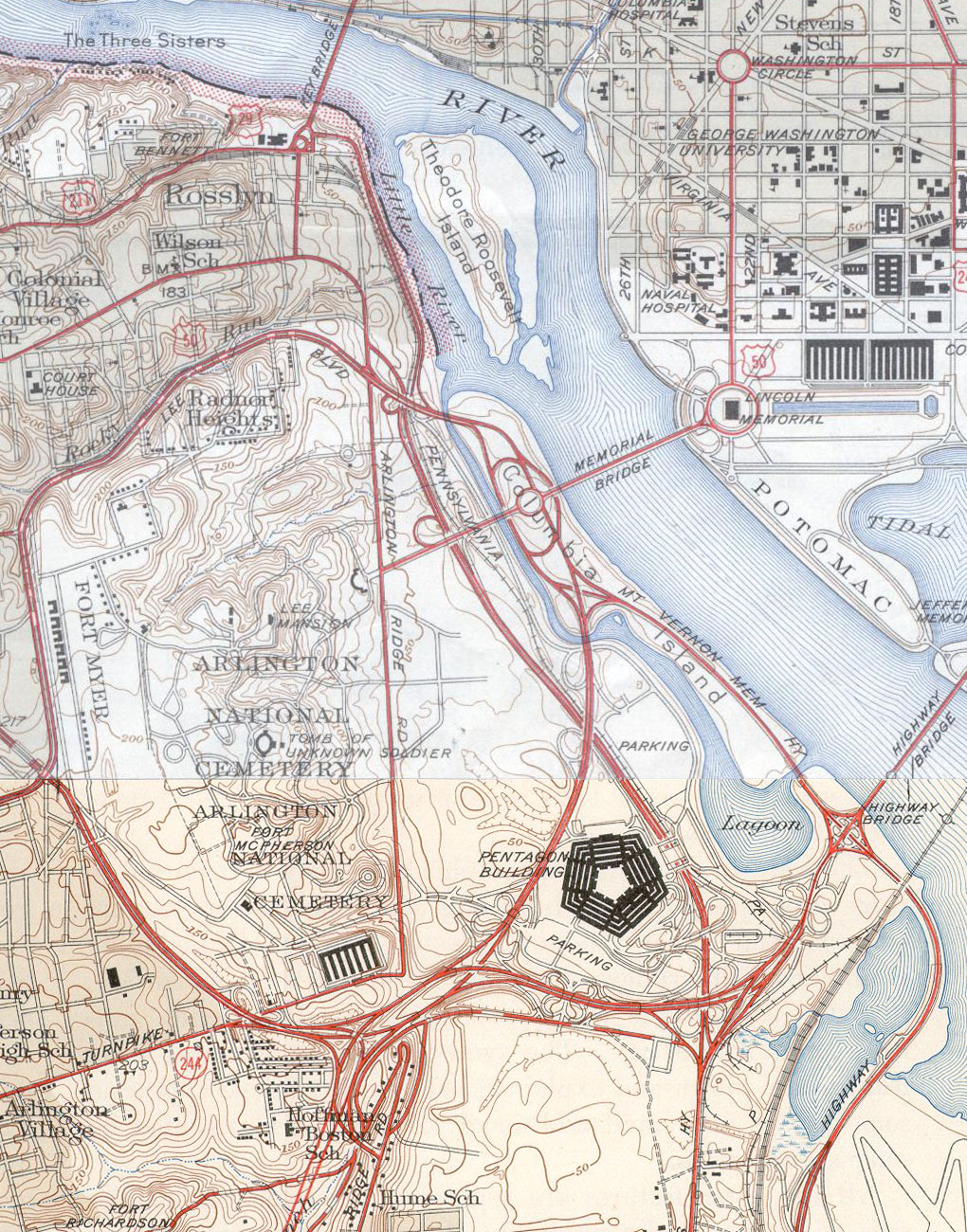
Road network on and around Columbia Island in 1945. Note the existence of the "racetrack" feature on the island, and only four bridges connecting it to Virginia.

With filling operations on Columbia Island suspended in 1932, the island underwent a natural process of settling. By 1941, settling had damaged the abutments of the Boundary Channel Bridge, and the Bureau of Public Roads placed steel struts under each abutment in April to shore them up.

Bridge work on Columbia Island continued in the 1940s. In January 1942, the United States Department of Defense realized that rapid expansion of the Pentagon workforce due to entry of the United States into World War II would put significant strain on the local road networks. A new arterial, Army-Navy Boulevard (now called Army-Navy Drive) was under construction to connect Pentagon City and points south to the Pentagon. The road then continued northwest past the Pentagon to Columbia Island, where it was to run up the center of the island and connect with the Arlington Memorial Bridge. A bridge carrying Army-Navy Boulevard over the Boundary Channel was approved in January 1942. In 1948, the northwesterly bridge connecting Columbia Island to Lee Boulevard (now Arlington Boulevard) was rebuilt.

Another bridge linking Columbia Island and Virginia was proposed in 1958. At that time, one possible route for the Theodore Roosevelt Bridge was south of Little Island (the southern tip of Theodore Roosevelt Island which had become detached from the main island due to erosion). District of Columbia officials asked permission in January 1958 to build a small approach bridge to the Roosevelt span over Boundary Channel, but the CFA refused a month later. By June 1958, the bridge's location had shifted north to the southern end of Theodore Roosevelt Island, making a bridge over Boundary Channel moot.

In 1958, the northwestern bridge linking Columbia Island to Arlington Boulevard (the former Lee Boulevard) was widened to six lanes from four. The northern bridge carrying the George Washington Memorial Parkway over Boundary Channel was realigned in late 1962 as part of a larger road realignment allowing Arlington Boulevard to link to the new Theodore Roosevelt Bridge. A traffic light, the only one anywhere on the parkway, was installed to control traffic during the realignment process. The new bridge was finished and the light removed in September 1964.

A year later, in September 1965, a new bridge just west of the South Washington Boulevard bridge opened. The George Washington Memorial Parkway was expanding north of its old terminus at Arlington Memorial Bridge, but this necessitated moving the parkway's southbound lanes onto the Virginia shoreline and off the northern part of Columbia Island. The new bridge connected the new parkway alignment with the old.

=== The Navy-Merchant Marine Memorial ===
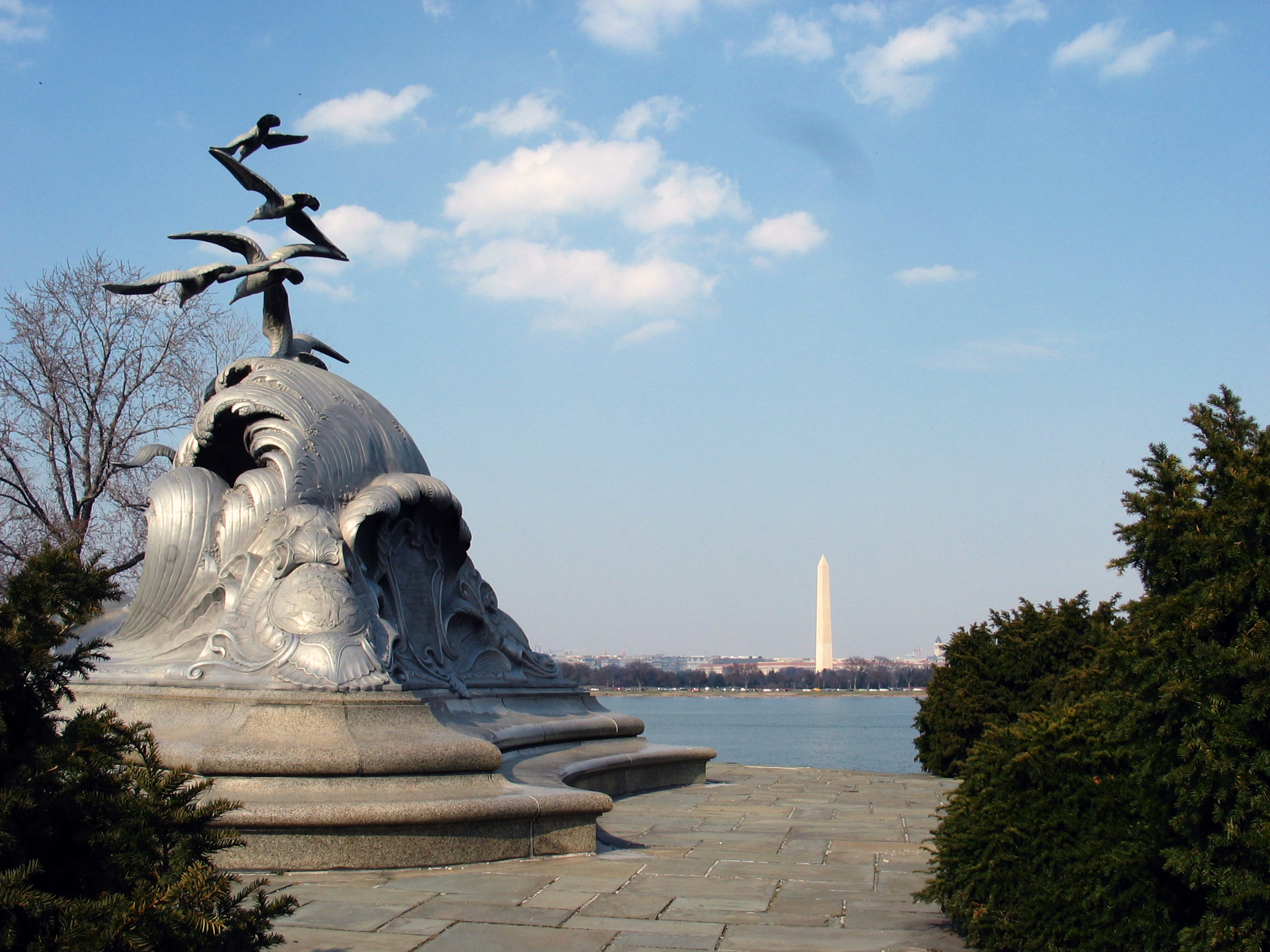
The Navy-Merchant Marine Memorial on Columbia Island.

Veterans of the United States Navy and the United States Merchant Marine had long argued that there was no memorial commemorating their service anywhere in Washington, D.C. Congress rectified this in the 1920s, and a memorial designed by 1922. However, fund-raising for the memorial took far longer than expected. Ground on Columbia Island for the memorial was broken by Secretary of the Navy Charles Francis Adams, Secretary of the Treasury Andrew W. Mellon, Marine Corps Major General Ben H. Fuller, Coast Guard Commandant Rear Admiral Frederick C. Billard, and Assistant Secretary of Commerce David Sinton Ingalls on December 2, 1930.

Work on the memorial stopped for nearly three years. The statue itself was finally emplaced in 1934. However, lack of funds meant that instead of a wavy green granite base, the statue stood atop a concrete plinth. In May 1934, the commission overseeing the memorial's construction asked the Works Progress Administration for a $100,000 grant to complete the granite steps. But no funds were forthcoming. Finally, funding for the memorial's completion began moving through Congress. With congressional support, the Works Progress Administration gave $39,000 to finish memorial in 1939. This included adding the wavy green granite steps, creating a concrete plaza around the memorial, installing two flagstone walks to lead to the memorial, and landscaping the area.

=== Lady Bird Johnson Park ===
During the latter part of the 1960s and the early part of the 1970s, the National Park Service relandscaped Columbia Island extensively as part of a nationwide, urban-beautification campaign sponsored by then–First Lady, Lady Bird Johnson of President Lyndon Baine Johnson, between 1964 and 1968. More than one million daffodils and 2,700 dogwood trees were planted on the park between 1965 and 1968. These plants were paid for by the National Park Service, the Society for a More Beautiful National Capital and the 1965 Presidential Inaugural Committee. Columbia Island was renamed Lady Bird Johnson Park by the United States Department of the Interior on November 12, 1968 in honor of her work on the beautification campaign.

After the 1976 dedication of the Lyndon Baines Johnson Memorial Grove within Lady Bird Johnson Park, the National Park Service constructed a 300-foot (91 m) footbridge over the Boundary Channel in 1977 to connect a new, 30-car parking lot in the north Pentagon parking area to both. The cost of the footbridge and parking lot was $500,000.

In spring 1987, the National Park Service repaved the South Washington Boulevard bridge to Lady Bird Johnson Park, and began planning to reconstruct the bridge by 1991.

Reconstruction of the Humpback Bridge began in January 2008. The bridge, which had not been renovated since its construction, was carrying 75,000 vehicles a day – far more than it was designed for. Improvements included widening the bridge, adding balustrades to separate the sidewalks from the vehicular traffic lanes, and building an underpass through the Lady Bird Johnson Park side landing to allow pedestrians and cyclists to pass through the bridge rather than crossing the parkway. The reconstruction also removed the notorious "hump" in the middle of the bridge. The masonry facing of the bridge was retained to protect the historic character of the bridge. The bridge reconstruction was complete in 2011, and the bike/pedestrian underpass opened in November. The underpass connected the Columbia Island Marina and the LBJ Memorial Grove with the Mt. Vernon Trail.

A children's garden was constructed on Lady Bird Johnson Park in spring 2008.

=== Lyndon Baines Johnson Memorial Grove ===
After President Johnson's death in 1973, Brooke Astor and Laurence Vanderbilt began planning a memorial grove in his memory. Johnson loved this park while he was president, and the national memorial was authorized by Congress on December 28, 1973. A grove with a monolith of Texas granite was installed in 1975, along with walking trails and a grove of hundreds of white pine and dogwood trees among the grass fields. The memorial was dedicated on April 6, 1976.

== Description ==
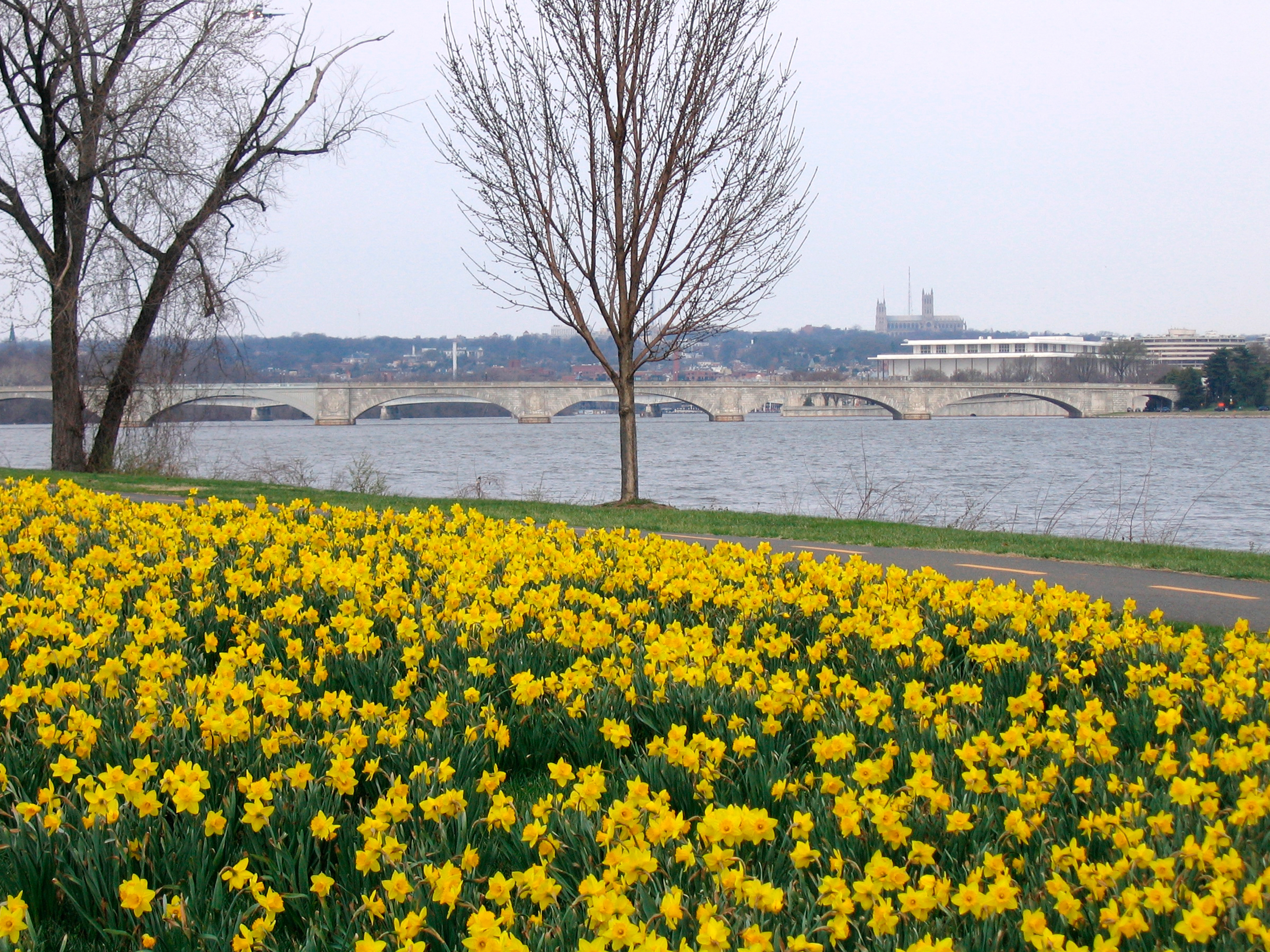
Daffodils bloom in Lady Bird Johnson Park.

The Boundary Channel of the Potomac River separates Lady Bird Johnson Park from the Virginia shoreline, while the main stream of the Potomac surrounds the island on the other three sides. As of 2007, the island consisted of 121 acres (490,000 m^{2}) of landscaped parkland. Located within the park are the Lyndon B. Johnson Memorial Grove, the Navy–Merchant Marine Memorial, and the Columbia Island Marina.

Lady Bird Johnson Park is accessible from downtown Washington via the Arlington Memorial Bridge, from Arlington National Cemetery via Memorial Drive, and from Northern Virginia via the George Washington Memorial Parkway. The Mount Vernon Trail runs along the side of the island facing the rest of the District, leading to Theodore Roosevelt Island in one direction and Ronald Reagan Washington National Airport on the other. The Pentagon is visible from the western side of the island near the marina at the southern tip.

== In popular culture ==
Lady Bird Johnson Park is a popular location which authors like to include in their fiction novels, sometimes using the old name Columbia Island. It is mentioned in Anthony S. Policastro's Dark End of the Spectrum, S.R. Larson's America Occupied, Allan Leverone's Final Vector, and Mary Eason's Killer Moves.

Sean Flannery has mentioned the Columbia Island Marina and the Boundary Channel in his novel Moving Targets, as did Kim Stanley Robinson in his Forty Signs of Rain. Sheri Holman has mentioned the marina and the Pentagon Lagoon in her novel The Mammoth Cheese, and the marina has played a role in Mike Lawson's The Second Perimeter, and in Phil Little and Brad Whittington's Hell in a Briefcase.

== Bibliography ==
- Elliott, Paul. 60 Hikes Within 60 Miles, Washington, D.C.: Including Suburban and Outlying Areas of Maryland and Virginia. Birmingham, Ala.: Menasha Ridge Press, 2007.
- Moore, John E. and Jackson, Julia A. Geology, Hydrology, and History of the Washington, D.C., Area. Alexandria, Va.: American Geological Institute, 1989.
- Office of Conservation, Interpretation, and Use. Scientific Report. National Capital Region. National Park Service. U.S. Department of the Interior. Washington, D.C.: U.S. Government Printing Office, 1965.
- Russell, Jan Jarboe. Lady Bird: A Biography of Mrs. Johnson. Lanham, Md.: Taylor Trade Pub, 1999.
- White, Mel. Complete National Parks of the United States. Washington, D.C.: National Geographic, 2009.
