= Navy and Marine Memorial =

United States saliors memorial

Coordinates: 38°52′34″N 77°2′50″W

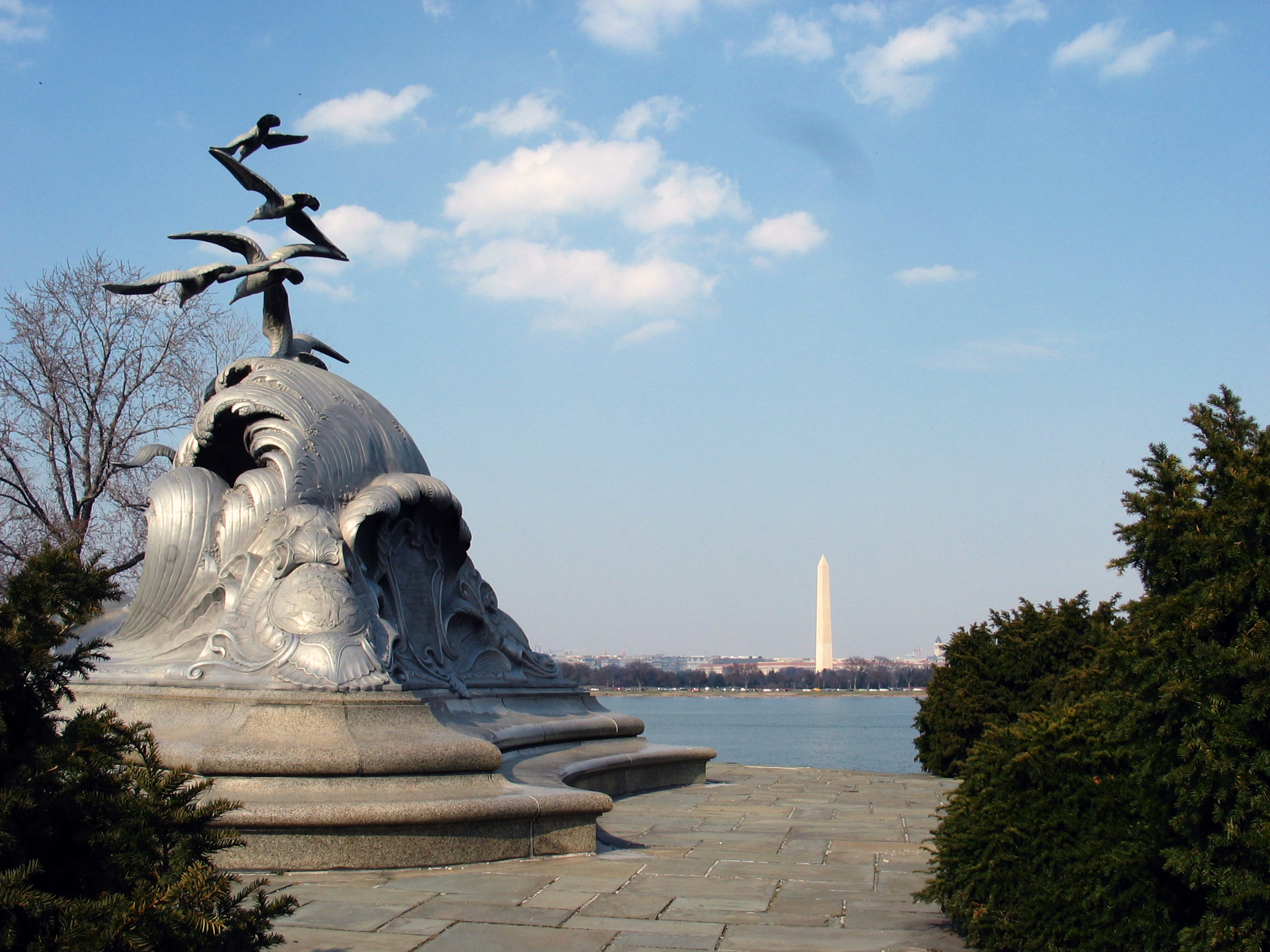
The Navy and Marine Memorial on Columbia Island in Washington, D.C.

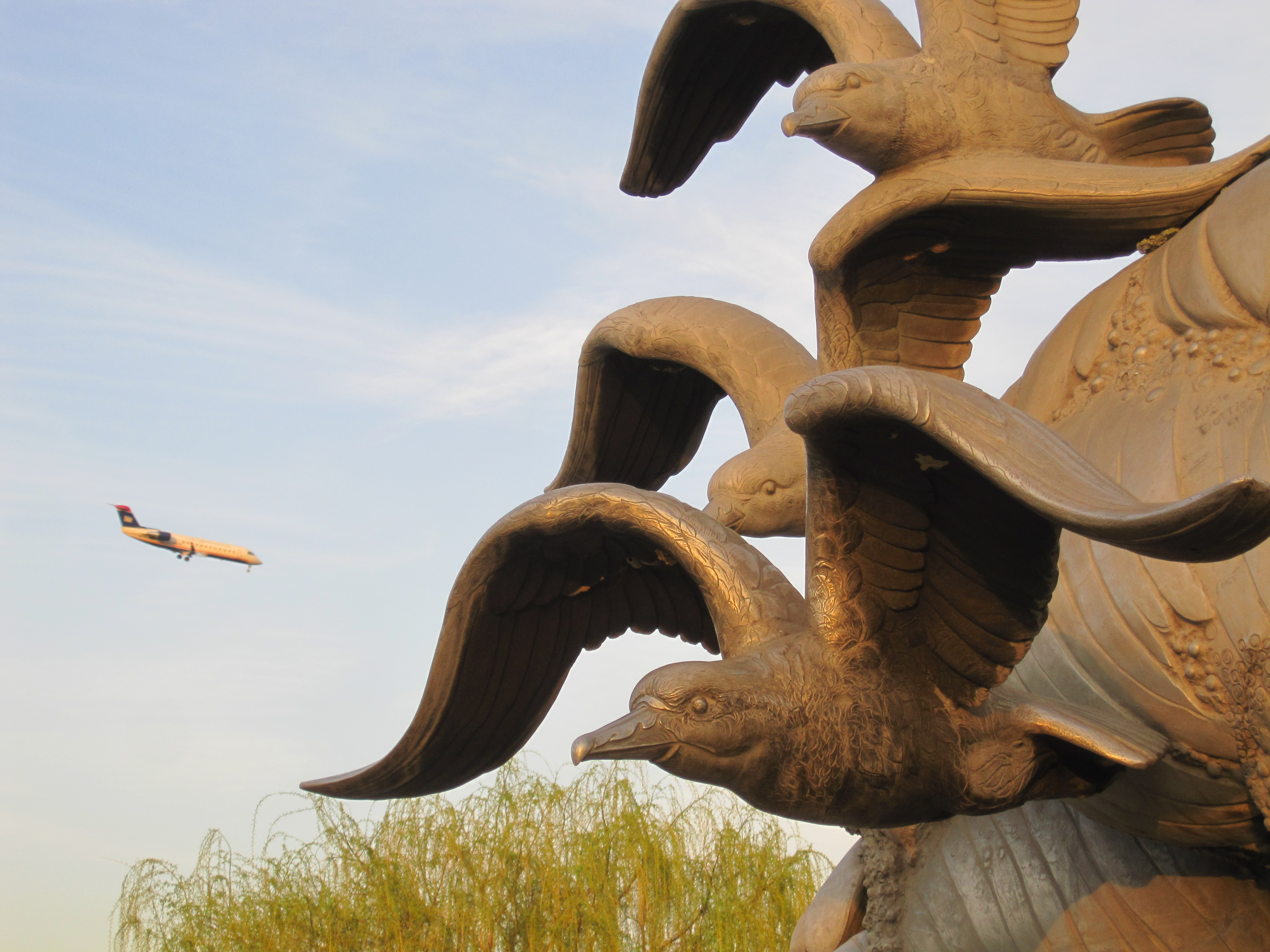
Detail of the memorial

Navy and Marine Memorial sitting upon a temporary concrete foundation circa 1936.

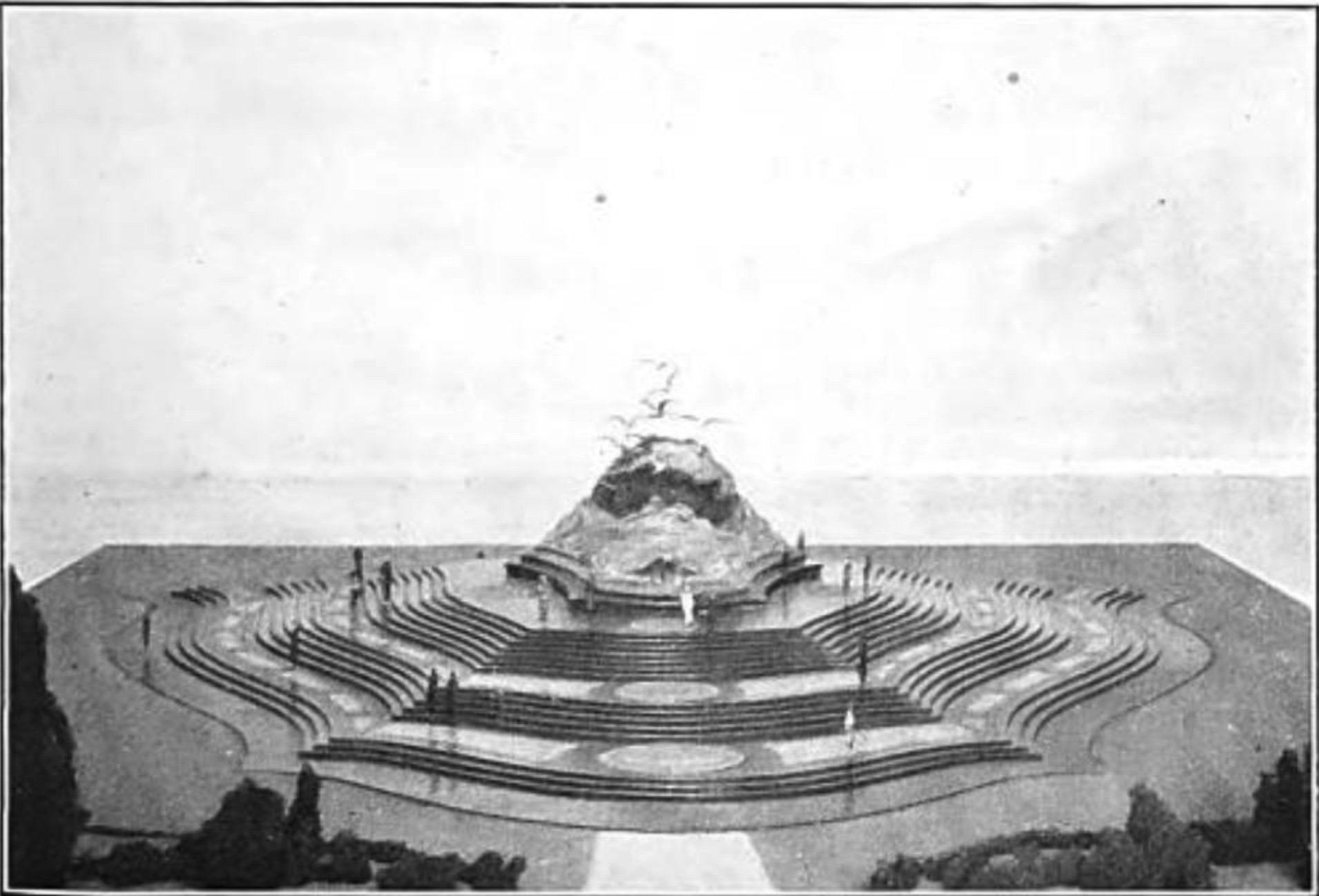
Architectural model of the Navy and Marine Monument created circa 1924 by Harvey Wiley Corbett.

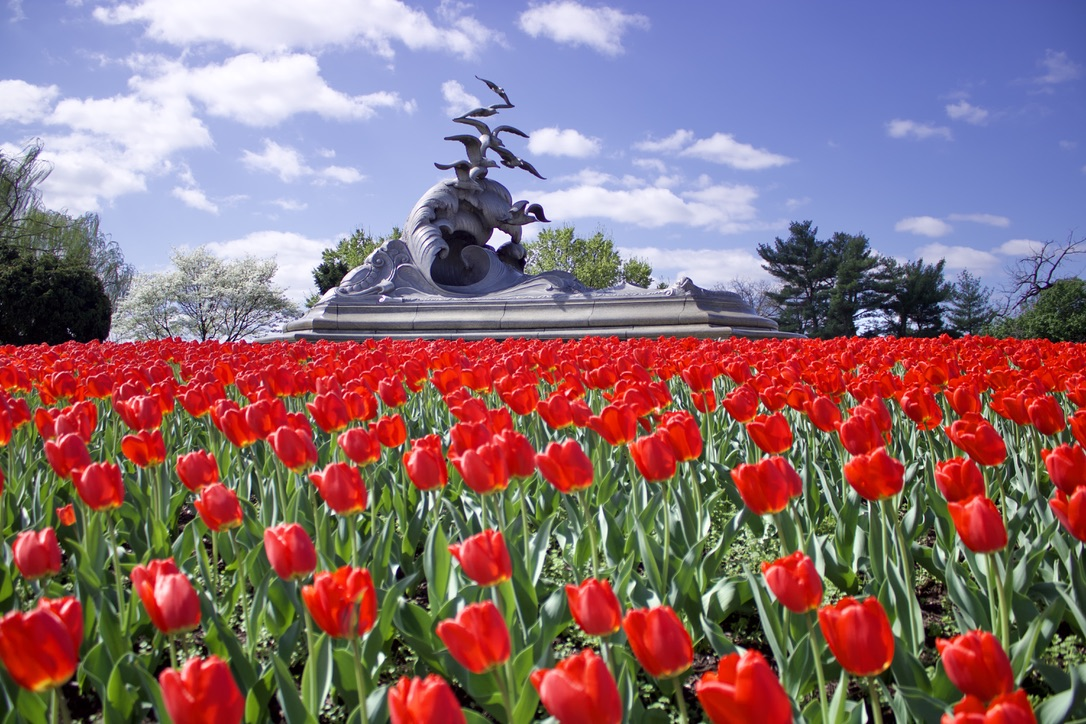
Memorial in April 2025 with its annual bloom of red tulips.

The Navy and Marine Memorial, is a monument honoring sailors of the United States Navy, Coast Guard, the United States Merchant Marine, the NOAA Commissioned Officer Corps and others who died at sea during World War I and other times. It is located in the George Washington Memorial Parkway in Lady Bird Johnson Park on Columbia Island in Washington, D.C.

Nicknamed "Waves and Gulls," the memorial depicts seven seagulls above the crest of a wave. It is cast from aluminum and the base is made of green granite from New Hampshire.

The memorial's inscription was written by Royal Cortissoz and reads:

To the strong souls and ready valor of those men of the United States who in the Navy, the Merchant Marine, and other paths of Activity upon the waters of the world have given life or still offer it in the performance of heroic deeds this monument is dedicated by a grateful people.

== History ==
Following the end of World War I, the Navy and Marine Memorial Association formed for the purpose of establishing a monument to who lost their life at sea during the war. Retired Navy Rear Admiral Bradley A. Fiske chaired the executive committee of the Association. The committee had several prominent members including Charles Francis Adams then Secretary of the Navy, Dwight F. Davis former Secretary of War, James J. Davis former Secretary of Labor, Curtis F. Wilbur former Secretary of the Navy, Andrew W. Mellon former Secretary of the Treasury, Hubert Work former Secretary of the Interior, Rear Admiral Benson, Admiral Edward W. Eberle, Rear Admiral F.C. Ballard, T.B. O'Connor and Major John A. Lejeune.

The Association raised funds from several prominent individuals including Richard F. White of New York who contributed $7,500, Col Robert M. Thompson to contributed $5,500, Vincent J. Astor who contributed $5,000, William H. Vanderbilt who contributed $5,000 and J. Pierpont Morgan who contributed $2,750. Fundraising included campaigns to raise funds from school children.

The Memorial Association selected Harvey Wiley Corbett for the architectural design of the monument and Ernesto Begni del Piatta as the sculptor. The Association estimated the monument would cost $500,000. In 1924, Congress passed S.J. 86 authorizing placement of a monument on public grounds in Washington D.C. with the condition that the location and design be approved by the National Commission of Fine Arts and that the federal government was not required to pay for creation or maintenance of the monument.

Corbett submitted a design to the National Commission of Fine Arts in March 1924 of a memorial that would be 30 feet high and 32 feet long at the base with steps that would extend 200 feet and include memorial plaques. Del Piatta's sculpture would feature 7 seagulls with 5 foot wingspans soaring over a crashing wave. Corbett requested that the monument be placed at the tip of Hains Point.

The Commission of Fine Arts expressed doubts that the monument would be interesting at full scale and that the sculpture was overly romantic. The Memorial Association submitted a modified design on December 10, 1925, with the Commission of Fine Arts providing feedback in January 1926 that:

- It could not be sited at Hains Point because the sculpture was not interesting from all four sides for river traffic
- It was still too romantic and not monumental enough to be executed on a large scale
- It had an architectural setting that was too elaborate for the sculpture
- It would be better suited for a site on East Potomac Park near a planned canal on the Potomac side

An agreement was made during the meeting that the monument would be reduced by 25% in size and that it would be sited on the Potomac River in East Potomac Park.

Approval from the Commission of Fine Arts proved difficult. The Navy and Marine Memorial Association had Begni del Piatta produce multiple sketches and models of the monument including a 1/2 scale model that was on display in New York for two months. Begni del Piatta produced another 1/6 scale model in plaster which the Commission viewed at the Navy Building in Washington, D.C. in 1927 that addressed previous criticism of the inclusion of dolphins, cartouches, the shape and form of the wave and the size of the seagulls. This review led to additional requested changes including less detail in the wave, change in the orientation of the lower gull, and changes to size and positioning of the cartouches. The Navy and Marine Memorial Association had accepted some donations with a promise to include the name of donors on the monument which was disapproved by the commission.

The Commission of Fine Arts approved a monument site on the southeast corner of Columbia Island on November 10, 1930. A ground breaking ceremony was held on December 3, 1930, with Navy Secretary Charles Francis Adams turning the first shovel at the selected site on the southeast corner of Columbia Island. Further ground work was delayed by the construction of the nearby George Washington Memorial Parkway.

The sculpture was cast in aluminum in an Aluminum Company of America foundry in Cleveland. By the time casting was completed, the Association had run out of funds and could not pay the approximately $18,000 due to ALCOA. Congressman Sol Bloom of New York negotiated an agreement to settle the outstanding balance for $13,000. Congress passed House Joint Resolution 342 in 1934, providing $13,000 to ship and install the monument on a temporary base. The ground was broken on the memorial in 1930, with the foundation completed the following year and it was installed on October 18, 1934, but work on the base and landscaping was postponed due to lack of funding.

A dedication ceremony was held on May 30, 1935. Congress passed H.R. 3234 in 1939 which authorized $100,000 which included $5,000 for unpaid architect fees, $44,384 in unpaid sculptor fees to del Piatta, and the remainder for NPS to construct a finished base for the monument. The authorization required work to be completed within a year. During a Deficiency Hearing to consider appropriation of the $100,000 NPS Assistant Director Arthur E. Demaray was not able to provide a great degree of detail on the need for the appropriation in response to questions about previous expenditures. His testimony ended with the conclusion that if Congress did not appropriate funds that "we would not have this very difficult job thrust upon us."

Although both the House and Senate passed legislation to fund completion of the monument, Congress failed to appropriate the funding. During a 1940 Senate hearing, the monument was described as being overgrown and obscured from the Mount Vernon Memorial Highway. The nearest parking was hundreds of yards away at the Washington-Hoover airport and the lack of a sidewalk and the 55 mph speeds of the highway made the monument inaccessible for pedestrians. The Senate again passed a bill to dedicate $100,000 in funding for NPS to complete the memorial. Congress again failed to appropriate the funding, however and took up the issue in the appropriations for 1941.

Work began anew the following September, and was completed by the end of 1939. Del Piatta died of heart disease on December 20th, 1939 before it could be completed.

Congress did not appropriate funding to implement the original vision of sea-green granite steps surrounding the monument. The rough concrete base was instead finished with flagstone by the Civilian Conservation Corps under the Works Progress Administration who also installed landscaping, a parking lot and walking paths. Work was somewhat delayed by a shortage of labor caused by America's entry into World War II. The CCC installed tile drains around the walkway. Yews were chosen for planting around the monument because their blue-green foliage would somewhat compensate for the originally planned granite steps designed to evoke waves. The flower beds were not installed at this time and were added at some later point. Today the monument is landscaped with red tulips in the spring and red cannas in the fall.

== See also ==
- Other U.S. Navy memorials
