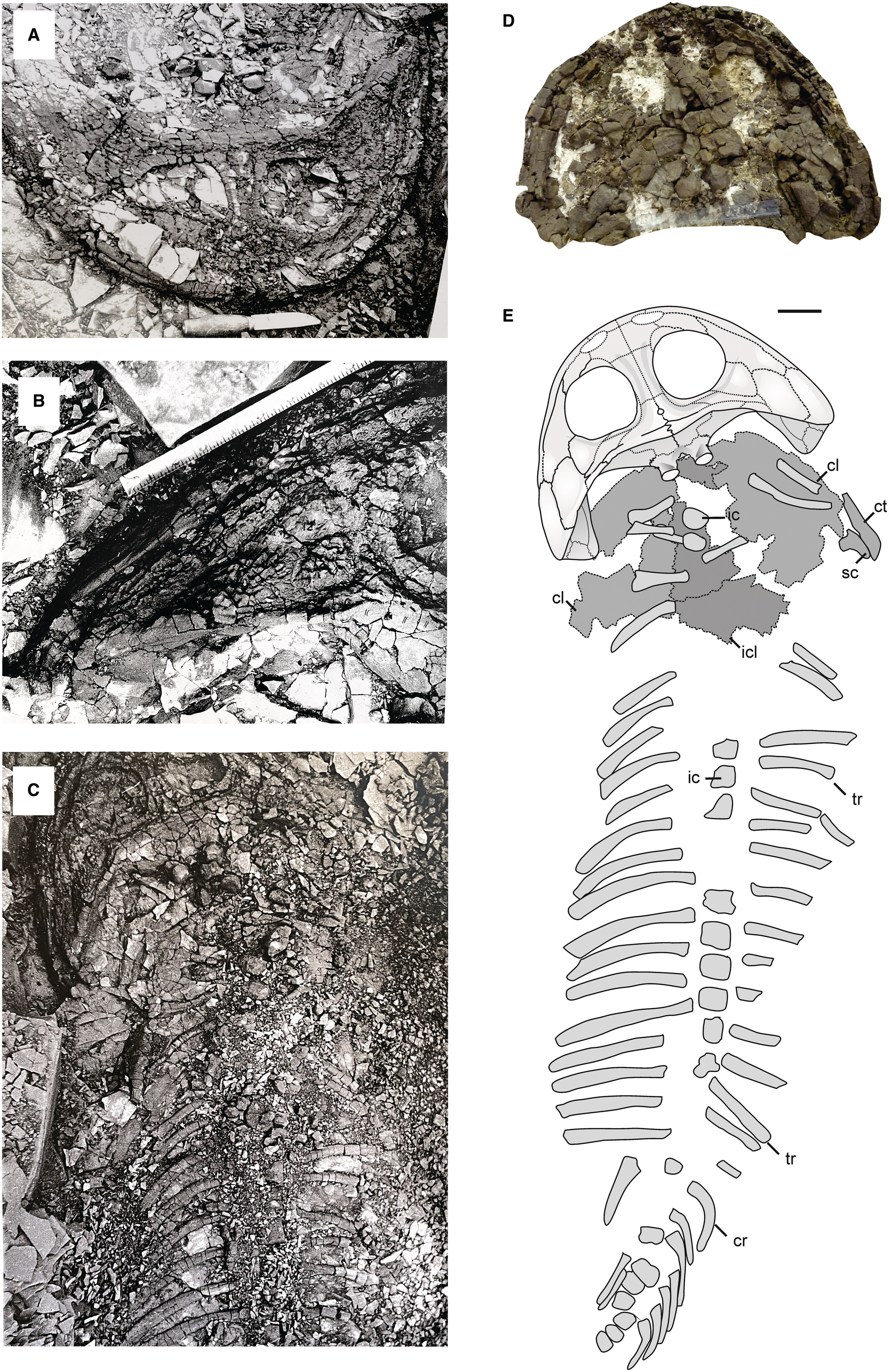
- Holotype specimen

Scientific classification
- Kingdom: Animalia
- Phylum: Chordata
- Clade: Tetrapoda
- Order: †Temnospondyli
- Suborder: †Stereospondyli
- Family: †Plagiosauridae
- Genus: †Arctobatrachus; Schoch et al., 2026
- Species: †A. urdensis

Binomial name
- †Arctobatrachus urdensis Schoch et al., 2026

Synonyms
- Selenoslega [sic] borealis Nielsen, 1965 (nomen nudum)

= Arctobatrachus =

Arctobatrachus Temporal range: Middle Triassic, late Ladinian

Genus of extinct temnospondyl

Arctobatrachus (lit. 'bear frog') is an extinct genus of temnospondyl amphibian in the family Plagiosauridae, known from the Middle Triassic (Ladinian age) Skuld Formation of Norway. The genus contains a single species, Arctobatrachus urdensis, known from a partial articulated skeleton including the skull but missing the limbs, pelvis, and tip of the tail. This specimen was discovered during an expedition to the Arctic mountains of Bjørnøya (Bear Island) in 1948, where researchers collected fragments of it for study. A returning expedition to excavate the rest of the skeleton did not occur until 37 years later. Between these trips, much of the skeleton was damaged by natural weathering. The specimen was named and fully described in 2026.

== Discovery and naming ==
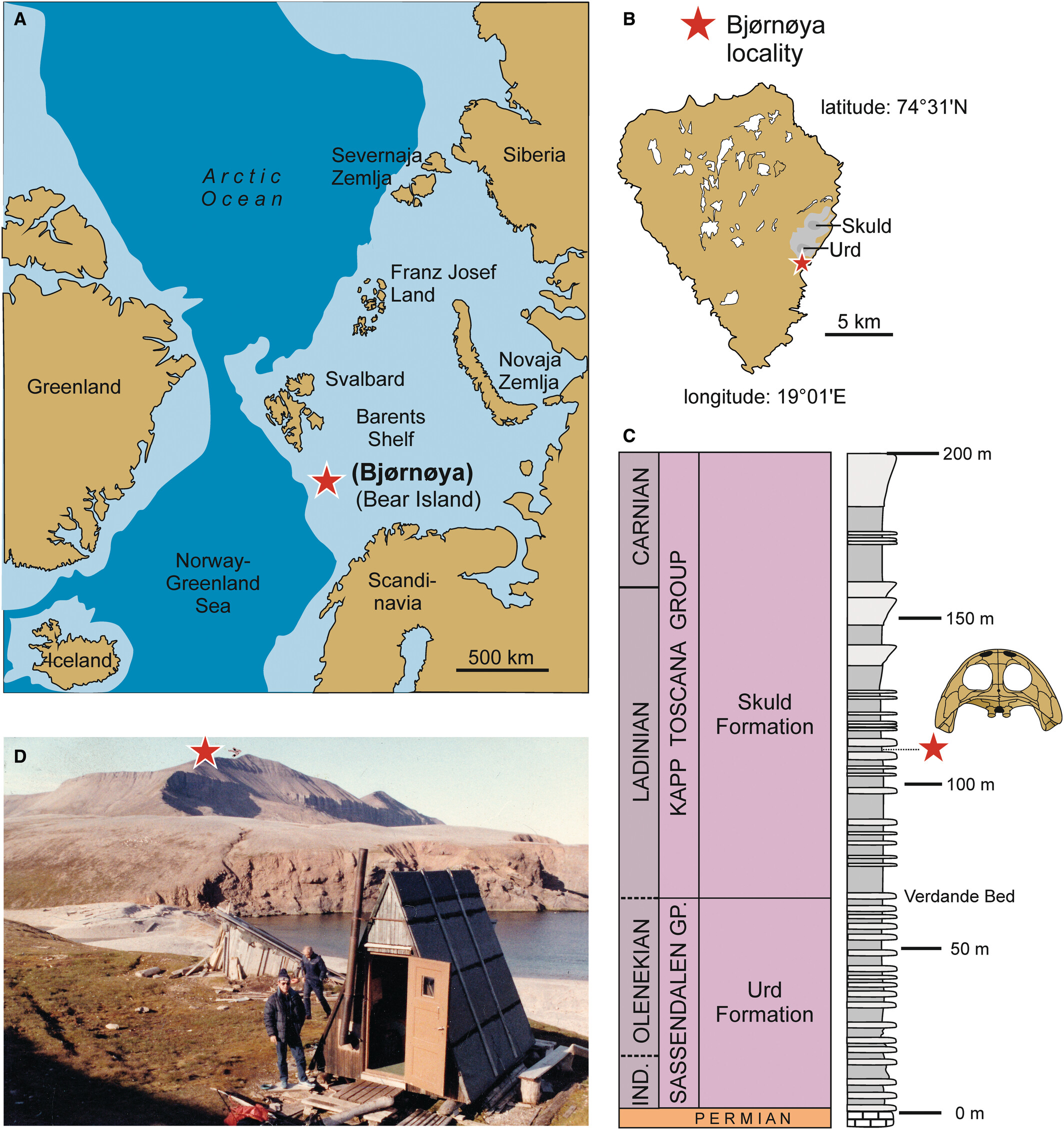
Stratigraphic and geographic context of the A. urdensis type locality

The Arctobatrachus fossil material was discovered in the summer of 1948 by two Cambridge undergraduate students on a joint English expedition between Cambridge and Leicester to Bjørnøya (Bear Island) in Svalbard, Norway. The team's explorations in outcrops of the Skuld Formation on the southern slope of Urd, the tallest peak of Miseryfjellet, resulted in the discovery of a giant temnospondyl skeleton. The fossil was fragmented into many pieces, but remained largely articulated, comprising the skull, torso, pectoral girdle, and the base of the tail. As the team was unprepared to collect the entire fossil in its fragmented condition, they embedded some pieces in wax and brought them back to the Museum of Zoology at the University of Cambridge. The next year, Jack Lowy published a brief field report on the discovery of the skeleton in the journal Nature, in which he tentatively identified it as a brachyopid and recognized the skull proportions as comparable to those of Gerrothorax, albeit at a much larger size. He concluded by expressing hope for a Norwegian expedition to the locality to discovery "more and possibly better" fossil material. Later in 1949, F. R. Parrington, the Cambridge museum's director, forwarded Lowy's report, field photographs, and the collected bones of this temnospondyl to the Paleontologisk Museum in Oslo, Norway.

A decade later, A. L. Panchen briefly described the Bjørnøya specimen and published the field photographs for the first time. Panchen (1959) identified the fossil as a plagiosaur "likely...of the genus Plagiosternum", but "not necessarily [the type species] P. granulosum", based on the skull shape and ornamentation. He used the available data on this fossil as a guide for a new reconstruction of the skull of Plagiosternum granulosum. After seeing the fossils in Oslo in 1951, Eigil Nielsen presented a brief report on it at a Nordic Geologic Meeting in Trondheim in 1965, where he informally proposed the new name "Selenostega" (misspelled as "Selenoslega") "borealis" for the material.

In the following years, it was assumed that the fossil would not have survived the weathering that had occurred over several Arctic winters, so a Norwegian expedition to the locality was not made until August 1984. Led by Atle Mørk, a team serendipitously rediscovered the specimen that year, and a proper excavation began the same month, being completed the next year. As the 1948 expedition had exposed the dorsal (upper) surface of the fossil, much of it was extensively damaged, lost, or displaced through weathering, as suspected. The material, collected in three blocks, was transferred to the Paleontologisk Museum at Oslo (PMO) (now the palaeontological collections of the Natural History Museum of the University of Oslo), where it is now permanently accessioned as specimen PMO 201.958. Mentions of the specimen in the early 21st century referred to it under the genus Plagiosternum, as a member of the plagiosaurid subfamily Plagiosterninae of uncertain placement, or more broadly as a plagiosaurid.

The final preparation of the fossil occurred at the State Museum of Natural History Stuttgart in Germany, where it was studied by Rainer R. Schoch and colleagues. In 2026, Schoch and colleagues formally described Arctobatrachus urdensis as a new genus and species of basal plagiosaurid based on these fossil remains, establishing PMO 201.958 as the holotype specimen. The generic name, Arctobatrachus, is both a reference to the Artic region of Norway in which the holotype was collected, as well as to Bjørnøya (lit. 'Bear Island'), incorporating ἄρκτος (arktos), the Greek word 'bear'. This is combined with the Greek word βάτραχος (batrachos), meaning 'frog' or, used more broadly, 'amphibian'. The specific name, urdensis, refers to Urd, the mountain peak on which the holotype was collected.

== Description ==
Arctobatrachus was a very large amphibian, with a body length well over 2 metres (6 ft 7 in). Arctobatrachus shares in common with other plagiosaurids a number of characters, including elongate and straight ribs, a large pectoral girdle exceeding the size of the skull, and a divided parapophysis (part of the upper vertebra). It has a number of unique apomorphies relative to other plagiosaurids, including a upcurved postglenoid area, a large gape and the abbreviation of the postparietal and tabular.

== Ecology ==
Arctobatrachus was found in shallow marine strata, suggesting that unlike modern amphibians it may have been tolerant of saltwater, as has been suggested for some other temnospondyls.
