= German weather ship WBS 11 Hessen =

Kriegsmarine weather ship

History
- Name: Sachsen (1938–39); Hessen (1939-45); Sachsen (1945–50); Arild (1950–54); Foynøy (1954–57); Munkøy (1957–62); Kitak (1962–65)
- Owner: Studen und Reederei GmbH (1938–39); Kriegsmarine (1939–45); Studen und Reederei GmbH (1945–46); Nordmeer Hochsefischerei GmbH (1946–48); Nordmeer Reederei GmbH (1948–50); Verner Vilhelmsen (1950–56); Statens Fiskarbank (1956–57); Ivar Hustad (1957–61); Statens Fiskarbank (1961–62); Per Brandal (1962–65)
- Port of registry: (Nazi Germany) Hamburg, Germany (1938–40); (Nazi Germany) Kriegsmarine (1940–45); Hamburg, Allied-occupied Germany (1945–49); , Hamburg, West Germany (1949–1950); Tromsø, Norway (1950–57); Molde, Norway (1957–62); Ålesund, Norway (1957–62)
- Builder: Beidenfletherwerft Hugo Peters
- Yard number: 18
- Launched: 1938
- Commissioned: 8 July 1940
- Decommissioned: 1945
- Identification: Code Letters DJVW (1938–39); Fishing registration HF 338 (1938–39); WBS 8 (1940–43); WBS 11 (1943–45); Code Letters LADS (1950–65); Fishing registration T-2-T (1950–57); Fishing registration M-10-M (1957–62); Fishing registration M-94-HD (1962–65)
- Fate: Sank, 1965

General characteristics
- Type: Sealer (1938–39, 1945–65); Weather ship (World War II); Auxiliary warship (World War II)
- Tonnage: 106 GRT, 32 NRT (1938–50); 112 GRT, 36 NRT (1938–50); 117 GRT, 32 NRT (1950–65)
- Length: 22.96 metres (75 ft 4 in) (1938–50); 23.85 metres (78 ft 3 in) (1950–58); 26.90 metres (88 ft 3 in) (1958–65)
- Beam: 6.27 metres (20 ft 7 in) (1938–50); 6.17 metres (20 ft 3 in) (1950–58); 6.48 metres (21 ft 3 in) (1958–65)
- Depth: 2.90 metres (9 ft 6 in) (1938–50); 2.87 metres (9 ft 5 in) (1950–65)
- Installed power: Diesel engine, 52nhp
- Propulsion: Single screw propeller
- Complement: 8, plus 4 meteorologists (World War II)

Hessen was a Kriegsmarine weather ship that was built in 1939 as the sealer Sachsen. She was requisitioned in 1939 and served until 1945. Returned to her owners post-war, she regained her former name. In 1950, she was sold to Norway and renamed Arild. She later served under the names Foynøy, Munkøy and Kitak. She foundered in the Norwegian Sea on 7 May 1965.

== Description ==
As built, the ship was 22.96 metres (75 ft 4 in) long, with a beam of 6.27 metres (20 ft 7 in). She had a depth of 2.90 metres (9 ft 6 in). The ship was powered by a four-stroke single cycle single action diesel engine. The engine was built by Humboldt-Deutzmotoren AG, Köln-Deutz. It was rated at 52 nhp.

== History ==
Sachsen was built in 1938 as yard number 18 by Beidenfletherwerft Hugo Peters, Beidenfleth for Studen und Reederei GmbH, Hamburg. Her port of registry was Hamburg. The Code Letters DJVW, and fishing registration HF 338 were allocated. She was renamed Hessen in 1939.

In 1940, Hessen was requisitioned by the Kriegsmarine. She was converted to a weather ship and commissioned as WBS 11 Hessen on 8 July. In July 1940, she operated in northern Norwegian waters. She then underwent repairs in Trondheim. In July and August 1942, she was refitted at Assens, Denmark. Her hull was strengthened to enable her to operate in ice. On completion of the refit, she sailed to Kiel. It was planned that she would be part of Operation Nussbaum, which was to land a weather party on the Norwegian Arctic island of Spitsbergen. It was later decided that the personnel would be taken to Spitsbergen by U-boat and Hessen transported supplies to Narvik, Norway instead.

In July 1943, Hessen underwent repairs at Copenhagen, Denmark. She was reclassified as an auxiliary warship on 20 September. She was stationed between Spitsbergen and the east coast of Greenland, serving as a weather ship. In November, she was in Narvik, moving to Tromsø the following month. Operation Einsiedler, which was to establish a weather station on Bear Island, had been delayed by Allied activity off the coast of Norway during this time. Hessen sailed on 7 January but the crankshaft of her engine broke on 10 January. She then drifted for two days before being taken in tow by U-956. She arrived at Tromsø on 20 January. Repairs were made at Sassnitz, Germany. In August 1944, Hessen transported supplies to Narvik for Operation Haudegen. The transport of personnel to Spitzbergen was undertaken by U-307 and WBS 3 Carl J. Busch. On 14 March 1944, she was reclassified as a weather ship, serving as WBS 8 Hessen.

At the end of World War II, Hessen was in Eckernförde. She was returned to her owners in September 1945, regaining her former name Sachsen. She was sold to the Nordmeer Hochsefischerei GmbH, Hamburgh in 1946, which was renamed Nordmeer Reederei GmbH in 1948.

In July 1950, Sachsen was sold to the Vilhelmsen Brothers, Tromsø. She was renamed Arild. The Code Letters LADS and fishing registration T-2-T were allocated. She was assessed at 112 GRT, 36 NRT. Her dimensions were recorded as length 23.85 metres (78 ft 3 in), beam 6.17 metres (20 ft 3 in), depth 2.87 metres (9 ft 5 in). In 1956, Arild was renamed Foynøy. She was sold to the Statens Fiskarbank, Tromsø in 1956.

In 1957, Foynøy was sold to Ivar Hustad, Molde and was renamed Munkøy. The fishing registration M-10-M was allocated. The next year, she was rebuilt by Rolf Rekdals Skibsbyggeri, Tomrefjord. After the rebuild, her dimensions were recorded as length 26.90 metres (88 ft 3 in), beam 6.48 metres (21 ft 3 in), depth 2.87 metres (9 ft 5 in). She was assessed at 117 GRT, 32 NRT. In 1961, Munkøy was sold to the Statens Fiskarbank. She was sold the following year to Per Brandal, Ålesund and was renamed Kitak. The fishing registration M-94-HD was allocated. On 7 May 1965, Kitak foundered in the Norwegian Sea (64°40′N 00°30′E), probably due to ice damage. She was on a voyage from the West Ice to Ålesund.
