= Axel Hamberg =

Swedish mineralogist, geographer and explorer (1863–1933)

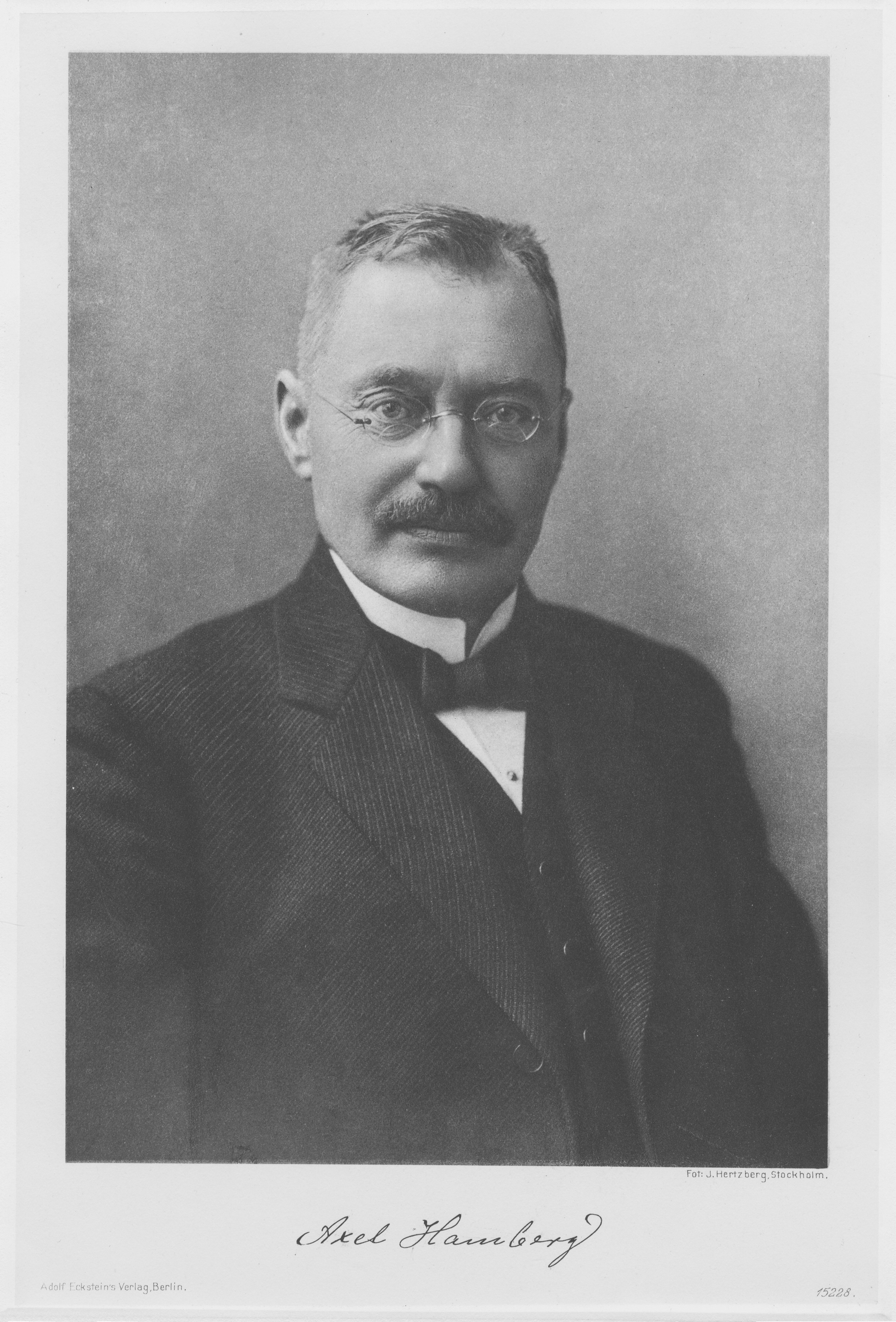
- Axel Hamberg ca. 1910
- Born: 17 January 1863; Klara Församling, Stockholm, Sweden
- Died: 28 June 1933 (aged 70); Stockholm, Sweden
- Scientific career
- Fields: Geography
- Workplaces: University of Uppsala

Axel Hamberg (17 January 1863 – 28 June 1933) was a Swedish mineralogist, geographer and explorer.

== Biography ==
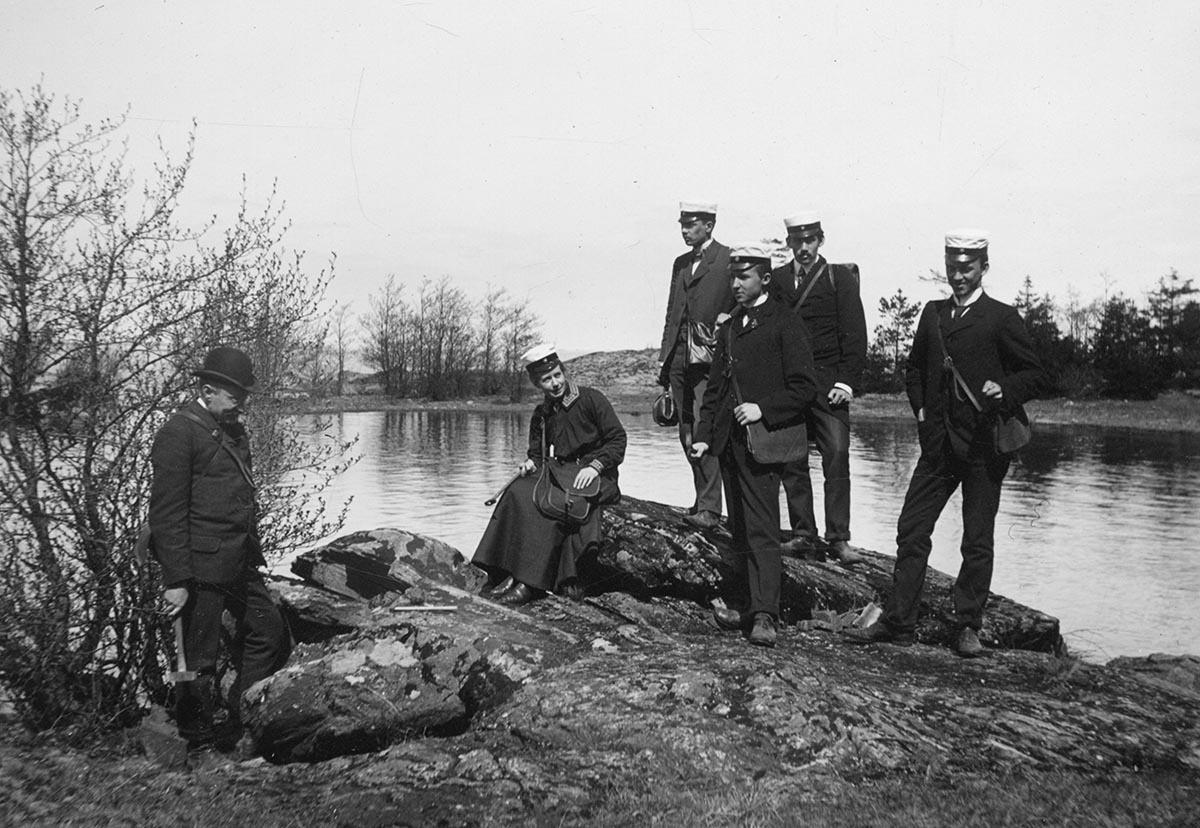
Axel Hamberg on a field trip with students, 1904

Hamberg was born in Stockholm, Sweden. He was the son of Nils Peter Hamberg (1815-1902) and Emma Augusta Christina Härnström (1833-1914). Hamberg became a student at Uppsala University in 1881, philosophy candidate in 1888 and was awarded a Licentiate degree in 1893.

He became an associate professor of mineralogy and crystallography in the same year at Stockholm University. In 1907, he received his philosophy doctor and was appointed as an extra ordinary professor at the University of Uppsala. He served as a professor in geography at Uppsala until 1928.

In 1883, he attended the expedition of Adolf Erik Nordenskiöld to Greenland and in 1898 accompanied on the expedition of Alfred Nathorst on the ship "Antarctic" to Svalbard and Kong Karls Land.

At the General Art and Industrial Exposition of Stockholm of 1897, he received a gold medal for an exhibition of Scandinavian minerals. He was elected a member of the Royal Swedish Academy of Sciences in 1905. He was elected to membership by the Royal Society of Sciences in Uppsala in 1916 and by the Royal Physiographic Society in Lund in 1929. He held the presidency of the International Glacier Commission from 1913 until 1927.

== Personal life ==
Hamberg was married in 1912 with Sigrid Charlotta Nordlund (1885-1959). His wife was a poet whose work appeared in such magazines as Idun and Svea. Their son, Per Gustaf Hamberg (1913-1978), was a professor of art history and art theory at the University of Gothenburg.

== Awards and honors ==
The Spitsbergen glacier Hambergbreen is named after him.

The Bjørnøya mountain of Hambergfjellet is named after him.

The Hamberg Glacier of South Georgia and the Hamberg Glacier of NE Greenland are named after him.

The mineral hambergite was named after him in 1890.
