= Tunheim =

Abandoned coal mining village on Bear Island, Svalbard, Norway

Coordinates: 74°28′40″N 19°12′43″E

Tunheim is an abandoned coal mining village on Bear Island, Svalbard, Norway. It lies in the northeast of the Island, a few kilometers east of the Bjørnøya Radio Station, and directly adjacent to Kapp Bergersen. To its south is Miseryfjellet, the tallest mountain on Bear Island.

Coal mining activities were run by the Stavanger company and were at their height around 1915–1925 and 182 people lived in the village's 25 houses, but then the mining was given up as unprofitable.

A radio station was built in 1919 and a meteorological station in 1923, operated by the Geophysical Institute in Tromsø. The stations were destroyed by the Allies in 1941 during WWII to prevent the Germans from using them, and the town was evacuated.
