= Hambergfjellet =

Mountain on the island of Bjørnøya of the Svalbard archipelago, Norway

Coordinates: 74.353°N 19.031°E

Hambergfjellet is a mountain at the island of Bjørnøya of the Svalbard archipelago, Norway. It has a height of 440 m.a.s.l. The mountain is named after Swedish geographer and Arctic explorer Axel Hamberg. The mountain has given name to the geological unit Hambergfjellet Formation, which complete section exposures from the cliffs of Hambergfjellet and Alfredfjellet.
