= Alfredfjellet =

Mountain on the island of Bjørnøya, Svalbard, Norway

Coordinates: 74°22′07″N 19°01′51″E

Alfredfjellet is a mountain at the island of Bjørnøya of the Svalbard archipelago, Norway. It has a height of 420 m.a.s.l. The mountain is named after Swedish geologist and Arctic explorer Alfred Gabriel Nathorst. Geologically, the upper part of the mountain consists of the Permian Miseryfjellet Formation, while the underlying Hambergfjellet Formation (by some authors named Alfredfjellet Formation) displays complete section exposures from the cliffs of Alfredfjellet (as well as Hambergfjellet).
