= Kitak =

Island in Sermersooq, Greenland

- Location within Greenland

Geography
- Location: North Atlantic
- Coordinates: 65°32′N 38°46′W
- Archipelago: Kitak group
- Major islands: Kitak, Orssuiagssuaq, Igssalik
- Length: 10.2 km (6.34 mi)
- Width: 4.3 km (2.67 mi)
- Highest elevation: 200 m (700 ft)

Administration
- Greenland
- Municipality: Sermersooq

Demographics
- Population: uninhabited

Kitak is an island in the Sermersooq municipality in southeastern Greenland.

In 1961 the German weather ship WBS 11 Hessen was renamed 'Kitak'.

== Geography ==
The island is located on the western side of the entrance of the Sermilik Fjord. There is a sheltered bay in the NW side of Kitak that is reportedly a good anchorage for ocean-going vessels. The island is 10.2 kilometres (6 miles) long with maximum width of 4.3 kilometres (3 miles).

Kitak is the largest and easternmost island of a compact cluster of coastal islands, islets and rocks extending for 14 km from the easternmost point of Kitak to the 51 m high islet of Igssalik in the west; 2.2 kilometres (1 mile) long Orssuiagssuaq, where formerly a LORAN station was located, is the southernmost island. The archipelago is separated from the mainland by narrow sounds, one of which is named 'Ikasartik'. The Suunikajik island cluster is located 4 km to the west.

The nearest inhabited settlement is Tasiilaq, the most populous community on the eastern coast and the seventh-largest town in Greenland, located on Ammassalik Island on the other side of the fjord about 40 km to the east-northeast.

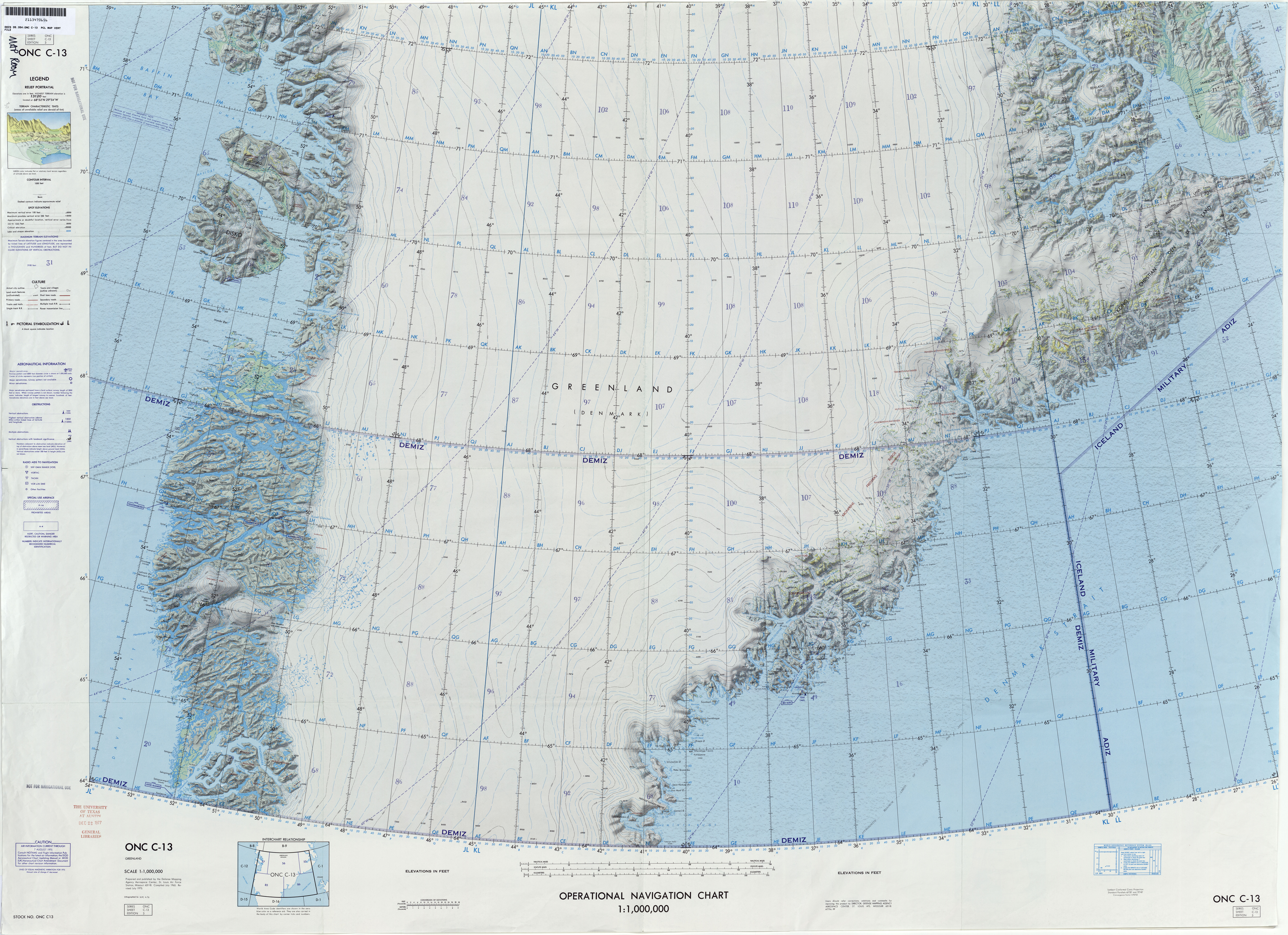
Map of Greenland section.
