= Antarcticfjellet =

Arctic mountain range on Bjørnøya, Svalbard

Coordinates: 74.365°N 19.079°E

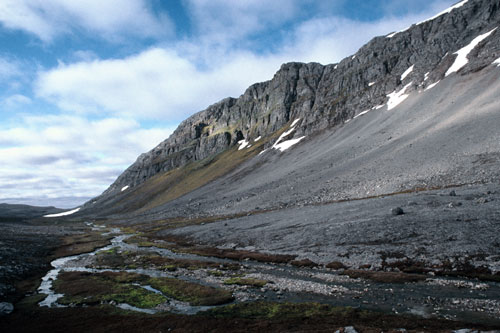
Ymerdalen at southern Bjoernoya, Antarcticfjellet to the right, July 2002

Antarcticfjellet is a mountain range at the island of Bjørnøya of the Svalbard archipelago, Norway. The highest peak in the range has a height of 360 m.a.s.l. It is named after the Swedish expedition vessel Antarctic. The mountain range has given name to the geological unit Antarcticfjellet Formation, which is exposed over significant portions of the range.
