= Responses to the COVID-19 pandemic in October 2021 =

Aspect of viral disease pandemic

This article documents the chronology of the response to the COVID-19 pandemic in October 2021, which originated in Wuhan, China in December 2019. Some developments may become known or fully understood only in retrospect. Reporting on this pandemic began in December 2019.

== Reactions and measures in the United Nations ==
=== 19 October ===
- Scientists have discovered a new type of SARS-CoV-2 Delta plus variant called AY.4.2, which appears to be slightly more infectious than the Delta variant. The new variant is currently being monitored in the United Kingdom as new cases rise.

== Reactions and measures in the Americas ==
=== 6 October ===
- Pfizer will test the effectiveness of its Pfizer–BioNTech COVID-19 vaccine by vaccinating all residents of Toledo in Brazil's Paraná province who are over the age of 12 years.

=== 13 October ===
- Panama starts allowing people to be outdoors without a mask.

== Reactions and measures in the Eastern Mediterranean ==
=== 31 December ===
- Israel begins administering the fourth COVID vaccine dose.

== Reactions and measures in Europe ==
=== 8 October ===
- Finland, Sweden, and Denmark have suspended the use of the Moderna COVID-19 vaccine for younger males due to reports of a rare cardiovascular side effect. Finland will instead give the Pfizer–BioNTech COVID-19 vaccine to men born in 1991 and after.

== Reactions and measures in South, East and Southeast Asia ==
=== 2 October ===
- Malaysian Health Minister Khairy Jamaluddin confirmed that the Government was negotiating with Merck & Co to procure stocks of its antiviral molnupiravir pills for treating COVID-19.

=== 5 October ===
- The Malaysian Deputy Education Minister Datuk Dr Mah Hang Soon warned that teachers who refused to get vaccinated before 1 November 2021 in accordance with a Public Service Department circular would face disciplinary action.

=== 9 October ===
- The Malaysian Director-General of Health Noor Hisham Abdullah confirmed that the Pfizer–BioNTech COVID-19 vaccine had been approved for the country's booster shot programme.
- Malaysian Prime Minister Ismail Sabri Yaakob has confirmed that interstate travel will be allowed to resumed within the next few days once 90% of the adult population has been fully vaccinated. As of 7 October, 89.1% of the adult population has been vaccinated.

=== 10 October ===
- The Malaysian Government has lifted all interstate and international restrictions for fully vaccinated residents since 90% of its adult population had been fully vaccinated.

=== 29 October ===
- President of Indonesia Joko Widodo has urged richer countries to share their COVID-19 vaccines with poorer ones.
- The Malaysian Government announced that it would buy stocks of the Pfizer-BioNTech COVID-19 vaccine for children after a panel of advisers to the United States Food and Drug Administration recommended that the vaccine be authorised for children aged between 5 and 11 years.

== Reactions and measures in the Western Pacific ==
=== 1 October ===
- Australian Prime Minister Scott Morrison has announced that international travel will resume for states that have reached 80% vaccination rates, starting with New South Wales. Fully vaccinated Australian citizens and permanent residents will be able to undergo home quarantine for seven days.

=== 3 October ===
- New Zealand Prime Minister Jacinda Ardern reinstated Level 3 lockdown restrictions in several parts of Waikato including Raglan, Huntly, Ngaruawahia and Hamilton from midnight after two community cases were detected.
- Air New Zealand CEO Greg Foran confirmed that the national carrier would be requiring all passengers on its international flights to be fully vaccinated against COVID-19 from 1 February 2022.

=== 4 October ===
- New Zealand Prime Minister Ardern confirmed that the country's elimination strategy would be phased out in favour of a new model that takes into account the country's vaccination rates. That same day, Ardern unveiled the Government's three-stage strategy to move Auckland out of lockdown, which involved a gradual relaxation of restrictions on physical gatherings and economic activities subject to mask-wearing and social distancing requirements.

=== 5 October ===
- Australian Prime Minister Morrison announced that Australia would buy 300,000 courses of Merck & Co.'s Molnupiravir anti-viral drug to assist efforts to treat COVID-19.

=== 7 October ===
- New Zealand's COVID-19 Response Minister Hipkins has reinstated Level 3 lockdown restrictions in parts of the Waikato region including Waitomo (including Te Kuiti), Waipa, Otorohanga, Mokau, the northern Pureora Forest Park, Te Awamutu, Karapiro and Cambridge in response to new community cases.

=== 8 October ===
- The New Zealand Government reinstated Alert Level 3 restrictions in the Northland Region after an Auckland woman who tested positive for COVID-19 used false information to obtain travel documents and spent several days in the region.

=== 10 October ===
- Fijian Prime Minister Frank Bainimarama has eased curfews and restrictions on gatherings including funerals, birthdays and weddings due to a high national vaccination rate.

=== 11 October ===
- The Australian city of Sydney has reopened cafes, gyms and restaurants to fully vaccinated customers, ending four months of lockdown.
- New Zealand's pharmaceutical supplier Pharmac has purchased 60,000 courses of molnupiravir pills from Merck & Co.

=== 18 October ===
- The New Zealand Government has confirmed that Auckland will remain on Alert Level 3 for at least two more weeks. Waikato will remain on Alert Level 3 due to further cases and positive wastewater testing results. Northland will remain on Alert Level 3 due to continuing community transmissions.

=== 22 October ===
- The New Zealand Government outlined its new Covid-19 Protection Framework (also known as the "Traffic Light Framework"), which involves lowering public gathering and gathering distancing restrictions in accordance with national vaccination rates.

=== 26 October ===
- New Zealand Prime Minister Jacinda Ardern and Workplace Relations Minister Michael Wood announced a new vaccine mandate requiring all workers in hospitality businesses, gyms, barbers, and hairdressers to get vaccinated within four weeks.

=== 28 October ===
- New Zealand's COVID-19 Response Minister Chris Hipkins announced that international arrivals will only have to isolate for seven days from 14 November in an effort to free up about 1,500 rooms a month. From 8 November, fully vaccinated travellers from low risk Pacific Island countries such as the Cook Islands will also be eligible for quarantine-free travel.

== See also ==
- Timeline of the COVID-19 pandemic in October 2021
- Responses to the COVID-19 pandemic
