= Operation Haudegen =

German operation during World War 2

Coordinates: 80°02′55.23″N 22°31′13.28″E

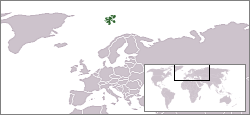
Location of Svalbard

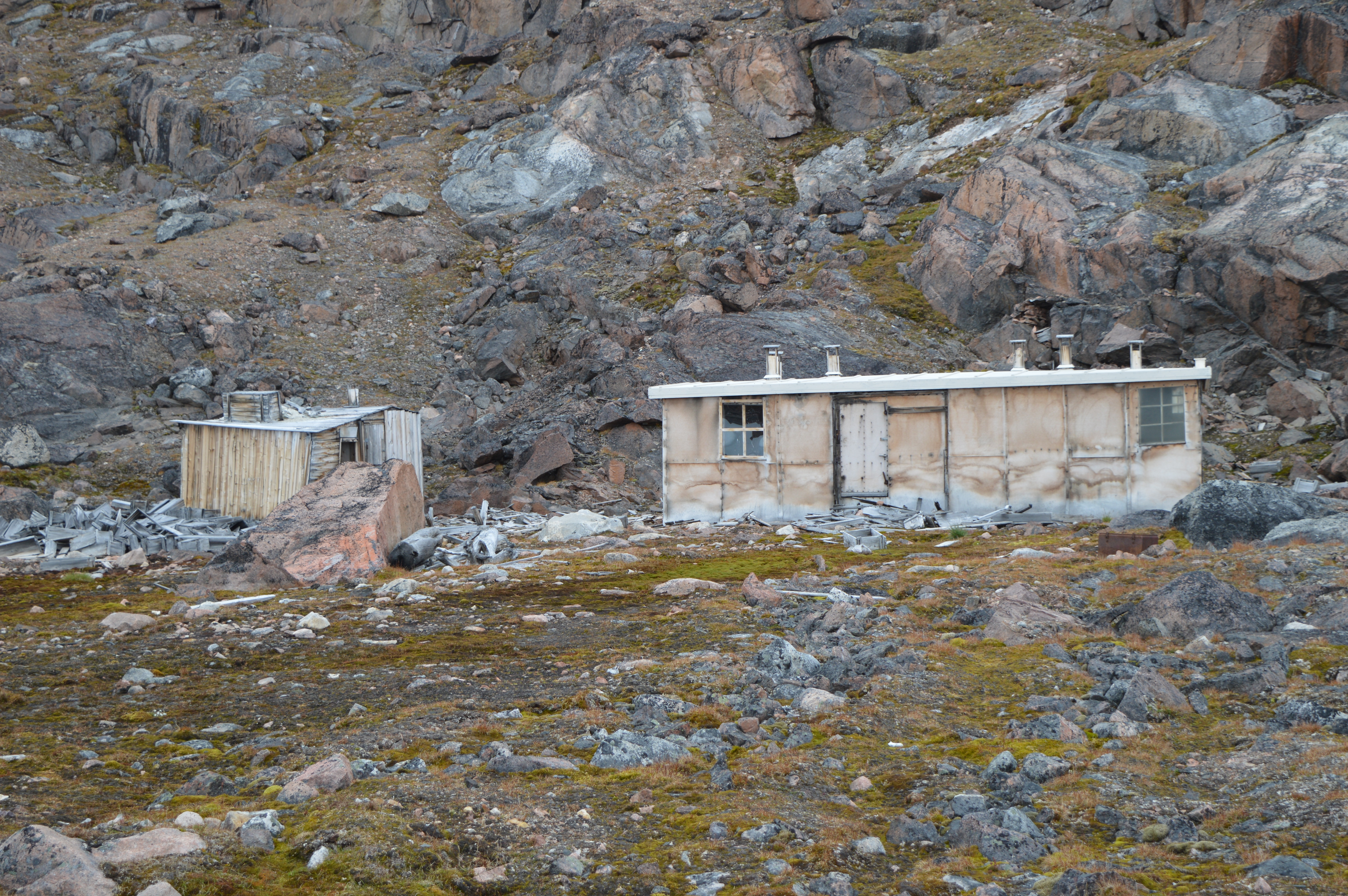
Former German base in 2022

Operation Haudegen (Unternehmen Haudegen [Operation Broadsword]) was the name of a German operation during the Second World War to establish meteorological stations on the Svalbard archipelago in Norway. In September 1944, the submarine U-307 and the supply ship Carl J. Busch transported the men of Unternehmen Haudegen to the island. The station was active from 9 September 1944. On May 8, 1945, the staff received a message from their commanders in Tromsø that Germany had surrendered and the war was over. After that, radio contact was lost. The soldiers were capable of asking for support only in August 1945 and on 4 or 6 September, were picked up by a Norwegian seal hunting vessel and surrendered to its captain. The group of men were the last German troops to surrender after the Second World War.

== Background ==
=== Svalbard Archipelago ===
Topographical map of Svalbard

The Svalbard Archipelago is in the Arctic Ocean 650 mi (1,050 km) from the North Pole and a similar distance north of Norway. The islands are mountainous, the peaks permanently snow-covered, some glaciated; there are occasional river terraces at the bottom of steep valleys and some coastal plain. In winter the islands are covered in snow and the bays ice over. Spitsbergen Island has several large fiords along its west coast and Isfjorden is up to 10 mi (16 km) wide. The Gulf Stream warms the waters and the sea is ice-free during the summer. Settlements were established at Longyearbyen and Barentsberg in inlets along the south shore of Isfjorden, in Kings Bay, north up the coast and in Van Mijenfjorden to the south. The settlements attracted colonists of different nationalities and the treaty of 1920 neutralised the islands and recognised the mineral and fishing rights of the participating countries. Before 1939, the population consisted of about 3,000 people, mostly Norwegian and Russian, who worked in the mining industry. Drift mines were linked to the shore by overhead cable tracks or rails and coal dumped in winter was collected after the summer thaw. By 1939 production was about 500,000 long tons (510,000 t) a year, roughly evenly divided between Norway and Russia.

=== Allied operations ===
==== Operation Gauntlet ====
Gauntlet was an Allied Combined Operation from 25 August until 3 September 1941 during the Second World War. Canadian, British and Free Norwegian Forces landed on the Norwegian island of Spitsbergen in the Svalbard Archipelago, 650 mi (1,050 km) south of the North Pole. Coal mines on the islands were owned and operated by Norway at Longyearbyen and by the Soviet Union at Barentsburg; both governments agreed to their destruction and the evacuation of their nationals. Gauntlet's objective was to deny the Germans the coal, mining and shipping infrastructure, equipment and stores on Spitsbergen and suppress the wireless stations on the archipelago, to prevent the Germans from receiving weather reports. Gauntlet was a success, the Germans had not known of the expedition until it was long gone. The raiders suffered no casualties, the Svalbard population was repatriated, several ships were taken by the raiders as prizes; a German warship was sunk on the return journey.

==== Operation Fritham ====
Operation Fritham (30 April – 14 May 1942) was an Allied attempt to secure the coal mines on Spitzbergen, the main island of the Svalbard Archipelago. A party of Norwegian troops sailed from Scotland on 30 April, to reoccupy the island and eject a German meteorological party. On 14 May, four German reconnaissance bombers sank the ships in Green Harbour. The commander, Einar Sverdrup, and eleven men were killed, eleven men were wounded and most of the supplies were lost with the ships. On 26 May, a Catalina made contact with Fritham Force and destroyed a German Ju 88 bomber caught on the ground. More sorties delivered supplies, attacked German weather bases, evacuated wounded and rescued shipwrecked sailors.

==== Operation Gearbox ====
Operation Gearbox (30 June – 17 September 1942) was a Norwegian and British operation that superseded Operation Fritham. The survivors of Fritham Force had salvaged what equipment they could and set up camp in Barentsburg, which had been deserted since Operation Gauntlet and sent out reconnaissance parties. The Admiralty discovered much of what had happened, through Ultra decrypts of Luftwaffe Enigma coded wireless signals. On 2 July, 57 Norwegians with 116 long tons (118 t) of supplies arrived by cruiser. Barentsburg was fortified and parties attacked the German weather party at Longyearbyen on 12 July, only to find that they had departed three days earlier. The airstrip was blocked and on 23 July, a Ju 88, carrying an experienced crew and two senior officials, was shot down while flying low over the landing ground; the German plan to send another weather party had been thwarted.

==== Operation Gearbox II ====
Operation Gearbox II (17 September 1942 – 7 September 1943) was a Norwegian and British operation. The reinforcements of Operation Gearbox consolidated the Barentsburg defences and made preparations for Gearbox II, another reinforcement of the Norwegians and part of the plan for Convoy PQ 18, to prevent a repeat of Convoy PQ 17 (27 June – 10 July 1942) in which 24 of the 35 freighters had been sunk. The fleet oilers RFA Blue Ranger and RFA Oligarch and four destroyer escorts sailed from Scapa Flow on 3 September and anchored in Lowe Sound several days later. From 9 to 13 September, relays of destroyers were detached from PQ 18 to refuel before the convoy passed Bear Island and into the range of the Luftwaffe bombers and torpedo-bombers based in north Norway. Another German weather party was chased off the island by the Norwegians and on 19 October, the cruiser USS Tuscaloosa and four destroyers delivered more Norwegian troops.

=== German operations ===
==== Operation Bansö, 1941–1942 ====
Location map, Longyearbyen in red

By August 1941, the Allies had eliminated German weather stations on Greenland, Jan Mayen Island, Bear Island (Bjørnøya) and the civil weather reports from Spitzbergen. The Kriegsmarine and the Luftwaffe surveyed land sites for weather stations in the range of sea and air supply, some to be manned and others automatic. Wettererkundungsstaffel 5 (Wekusta 5) part of Luftflotte 5, was based at Banak in northern Norway. Dr Erich Etienne, a former Polar explorer, commanded an operation to install a manned station at Advent Bay (Adventfjorden); its subsoil of alluvial gravel was acceptable for a landing ground. The site received the code-name Bansö (from Banak and Spitzbergen Öya) and ferry flights of men, equipment and supplies began on 25 September. He 111, Ju 88 and Ju 52 pilots gained experience of landing on soft ground, cut with ruts and boulders.

The British followed events at Bletchley Park through Ultra decrypts, which was made easier by German willingness to make routine use of radio communication. Dr Albrecht Moll and three men arrived to spend the winter of 1941–1942 transmitting weather reports. On 29 October 1941, Hans Knoespel and five weathermen were installed by the Kriegsmarine at Lilliehöökfjorden, a branch of Krossfjord in the north-western Spitzbergen. (Note: On 24 August 1942, the Knoespel group was repatriated by U-435, after being attacked by a party from Operation Gearbox.) On 2 May 1942, the apparatus for an automatic weather station, a thermometer, barometer, transmitter and batteries arrived at Banak, in a box named a Kröte (toad) by the aircrew. As soon as weather permitted, it was to be flown to Bansö and the Moll party brought back. On 12 May a He 111 and a Ju 88 were sent with supplies and the technicians to install the Kröte. The aircraft reached Adventfjorden at 5:45 a.m. The He 111 crew and passengers joined the ground party

==== Luftwaffe operations, June–July ====
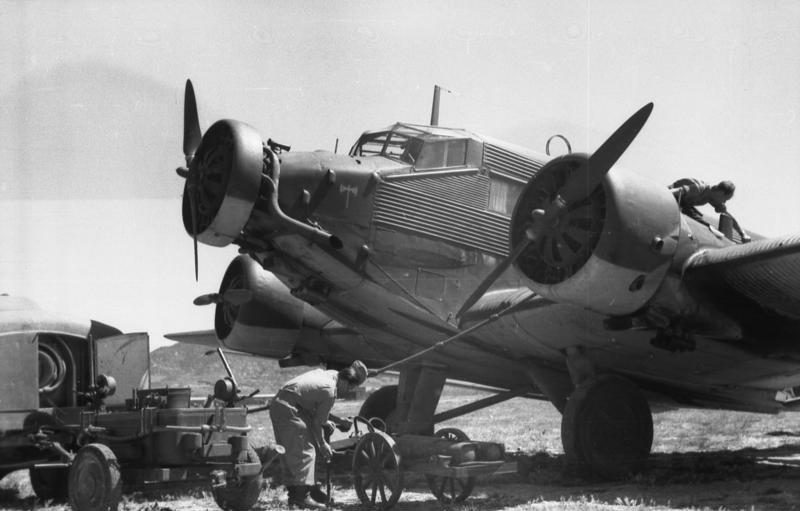
Example of a Ju 52 transport aircraft

The Moll party at Bansö had reported the British flight of 26 May and on 12 June, signalled that the landing ground was dry enough for a landing attempt. A Ju 88 flew to the island and landed but damaged its propellers as it taxied, stranding the crew and increasing the German party to 18 men. Luftwaffe aircraft flew to Spitzbergen each day but were warned off each time and the Germans thought about using floatplanes. The east end of Isfjorden and Advent Bay were too full of drifting ice and the idea was dropped. In the midnight sun (20 April – 22 August) as mid-summer approached, the ice further west near the Allied positions cleared faster than at the German (eastern) end of the fiord. The Germans reported the Catalina attack on the Ju 88 on 27 June, which had left it a write-off and claimed to have damaged the British aircraft with return fire. On 30 June, the party sent a message that the airstrip was dry enough for Junkers Ju 52 aircraft and supply flights resumed. The aircraft were watched by a Norwegian party that had gone on an abortive expedition to destroy the German headquarters at the Hans Lund Hut. On clear days the German pilots flew directly over the mountains and on cloudy and misty days, when heavily laden, took the coast route past Barentsburg.

==== German bases 1942–1943 ====
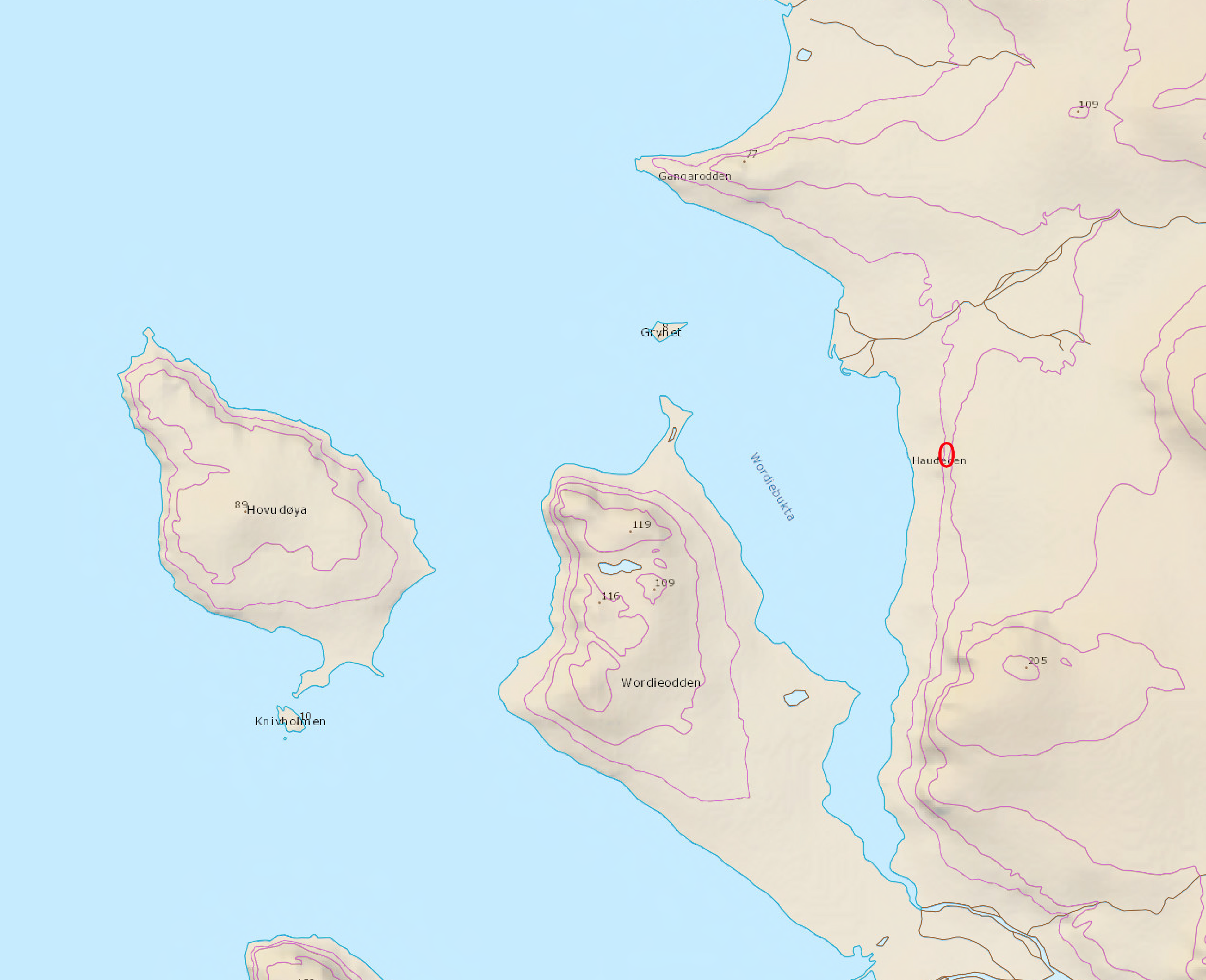
Map showing the position of the Haudegen weather station

Nussbaum, another Kriegsmarine meteorological party, commanded by Dr Franz Nusser, departed Norway in U-377 to return to Svalbard and re-occupy the Knospe base at Signehamna that had spent the winter of 1941–1942 gathering weather data. Two journeys to Svalbard were made and Nussbaum became operational in November 1942. During the winter of 1942–1943, Nussbaum needed no air supply but in May, spare parts were needed for its motor and hydrogen generators. The supplies were dropped by a Fw 200 of KG 40 which flew from Vaernes on 6, 8 and 18 May, collecting weather data en route On 20 June 1943, Nussbaum was surprised by a Norwegian commando patrol.

When surveying surveying Kongs Fjord and Kross Fjord in a gunboat, Kaptein E. Ullring with Fenrik Augensen spotted several Germans. Five of the six Germans escaped to the coast of the Mitra peninsula but Heinz Kohler, who was closer to the water, was killed by the Norwegians near Signehamna. The weather party had managed to send a distress call before they fled and U-302 (Kapitănleutnant Herbert Sickel), cruising off Svalbard, embarked the party on 22 June. The Nussbaum party had seen a Fw 200 overhead but had not been spotted. On 26 June, U-302 rendezvoused with U-625 (Kapitănleutnant Hans Benker) to transfer the party, which arrived at Narvik on 28 June.

== Operation Haudegen ==
In the Rijpfjord district of Nordaustlandet, the intended site of the Haudegen weather station was under low cloud but was seen to be ice-free. The Schatzgräber weather station could be seen to be the same state as when it was abandoned in July. A Fw 200 made a 2,200 mi (3,500 km) round trip, which took more than 12 hours; the Fw 200 landed at Banak at 3:08 p.m. on 8 September. The flight was made pointless after the mission was diverted to Greenland. Haudegen took place from 10 September 1944, when the Germans sailed from Hammerfest in Norway on the submarine U-307 and the weather ship Carl J. Busch, to 6 September 1945, when the party went aboard the Norwegian ship Blåsel, having surrendered to the crew.

== See also ==
- Japanese holdout
- End of World War II in Europe
