= German submarine U-307 =

German World War II submarine

History

Nazi Germany
- Name: U-307
- Ordered: 20 January 1941
- Builder: Flender Werke, Lübeck
- Yard number: 307
- Laid down: 5 November 1941
- Launched: 30 September 1942
- Commissioned: 18 November 1942
- Fate: Sunk by depth charges, 29 April 1945

General characteristics
- Class & type: Type VIIC submarine
- Displacement: 769 tonnes (757 long tons) surfaced; 871 t (857 long tons) submerged
- Length: 67.10 m (220 ft 2 in) o/a; 50.50 m (165 ft 8 in) pressure hull
- Beam: 6.20 m (20 ft 4 in) o/a; 4.70 m (15 ft 5 in) pressure hull
- Height: 9.60 m (31 ft 6 in)
- Draught: 4.74 m (15 ft 7 in)
- Installed power: 2,800–3,200 PS (2,100–2,400 kW; 2,800–3,200 bhp) (diesels); 750 PS (550 kW; 740 shp) (electric)
- Propulsion: 2 shafts; 2 × diesel engines; 2 × electric motors
- Speed: 17.7 knots (32.8 km/h; 20.4 mph) surfaced; 7.6 knots (14.1 km/h; 8.7 mph) submerged
- Range: 8,500 nmi (15,700 km; 9,800 mi) at 10 knots (19 km/h; 12 mph) surfaced; 80 nmi (150 km; 92 mi) at 4 knots (7.4 km/h; 4.6 mph) submerged
- Test depth: 230 m (750 ft); Crush depth: 250–295 m (820–968 ft)
- Complement: 4 officers, 40–56 enlisted
- Armament: 5 × 53.3 cm (21 in) torpedo tubes (four bow, one stern); 14 × torpedoes or 26 TMA mines; 1 × 8.8 cm (3.46 in) deck gun (220 rounds); 2 × twin 2 cm (0.79 in) C/30 anti-aircraft guns

Service record
- Part of: 8th U-boat Flotilla; 18 November 1942 – 30 April 1943; 11th U-boat Flotilla; 1 May – 31 October 1943; 13th U-boat Flotilla; 1 November 1943 – 29 April 1945
- Identification codes: M 50 406
- Commanders: Oblt.z.S. Friedrich-Georg Herrle; 18 November 1942 – 1 December 1944; Oblt.z.S. Erich Krüger; 2 December 1944 – 29 April 1945
- Operations: 13 patrols: 1st patrol: 9 – 12 July 1943; 2nd patrol: 16 July – 21 August 1943; 3rd patrol: 2 September – 9 October 1943; 4th patrol: a. 27 October – 9 December 1943; b. 12 – 15 December 1943; 5th patrol: 23 February – 27 March 1944; 6th patrol: 16 April – 5 May 1944; 7th patrol: a. 25 May – 12 July 1944; b. 2 – 3 August 1944; 8th patrol: a. 4 – 23 August 1944; b. 24 – 25 August 1944; c. 29 – 31 August 1944; 9th patrol: a. 9 September – 4 October 1944; b. 5 – 7 October 1944; c. 8 – 10 October 1944; d. 15 – 20 January 1945; 10th patrol: 24 January – 16 February 1945; 11th patrol: 20 – 28 February 1945; 12th patrol: 12 March – 1 April 1945; 13th patrol: 16 – 29 April 1945
- Victories: 2 merchant ships sunk (7,226 GRT)

German submarine U-307 was a Type VIIC U-boat of Nazi Germany's Kriegsmarine during World War II. The U-boat was laid down on 5 November 1941, and commissioned on 18 November 1942.

== Design ==
German Type VIIC submarines were preceded by the shorter Type VIIB submarines. U-307 had a displacement of 769 tonnes (757 long tons) when at the surface and 871 tonnes (857 long tons) while submerged. She had a total length of 67.10 m (220 ft 2 in), a pressure hull length of 50.50 m (165 ft 8 in), a beam of 6.20 m (20 ft 4 in), a height of 9.60 m (31 ft 6 in), and a draught of 4.74 m (15 ft 7 in). The submarine was powered by two Germaniawerft F46 four-stroke, six-cylinder supercharged diesel engines producing a total of 2,800 to 3,200 metric horsepower (2,060 to 2,350 kW; 2,760 to 3,160 shp) for use while surfaced, two Garbe, Lahmeyer & Co. RP 137/c double-acting electric motors producing a total of 750 metric horsepower (550 kW; 740 shp) for use while submerged. She had two shafts and two 1.23 m (4 ft) propellers. The boat was capable of operating at depths of up to 230 metres (750 ft).

The submarine had a maximum surface speed of 17.7 knots (32.8 km/h; 20.4 mph) and a maximum submerged speed of 7.6 knots (14.1 km/h; 8.7 mph). When submerged, the boat could operate for 80 nautical miles (150 km; 92 mi) at 4 knots (7.4 km/h; 4.6 mph); when surfaced, she could travel 8,500 nautical miles (15,700 km; 9,800 mi) at 10 knots (19 km/h; 12 mph). U-307 was fitted with five 53.3 cm (21 in) torpedo tubes (four fitted at the bow and one at the stern), fourteen torpedoes, one 8.8 cm (3.46 in) SK C/35 naval gun, 220 rounds, and two twin 2 cm (0.79 in) C/30 anti-aircraft guns. The boat had a complement of between forty-four and sixty.

== Service history ==
Despite carrying out 13 war patrols between July 1943 and April 1945, U-307 sank only two vessels; the 7,176 GRT American Liberty ship SS William S. Thayer on 30 April 1944, fifty miles south of Bear Island, and the 50 GRT Norwegian Army motor boat Lennox in Van Mijenfjorden, Spitsbergen, on 18 August 1944.

In September 1944, together with the supply ship Carl J. Busch, U-307 transported the men of Operation Haudegen, a German military meteorological mission, to Svalbard.

=== Wolfpacks ===
U-307 took part in twelve wolfpacks, namely:

- Wiking (5 September – 8 October 1943)
- Monsun (3 October – 23 November 1943)
- Eisenbart (28 October – 8 December 1943)
- Boreas (28 February – 10 March 1944)
- Thor (17 – 26 March 1944)
- Donner (17 – 20 April 1944)
- Donner & Keil (20 April – 3 May 1944)
- Grimm (31 May - 6 June 1944)
- Trutz (8 June – 10 July 1944)
- Rasmus (6 – 13 February 1945)
- Hagen (13 – 21 March 1945)
- Faust (21 – 29 April 1945)

== Fate ==
U-307 was sunk on 29 April 1945 in the Barents Sea near Murmansk, Russia, in position 69°24′N 33°44′E by depth charges from the British Loch class frigate HMS Loch Insh. There were 37 dead and 14 survivors.

== Summary of raiding history ==
Date	Ship Name	Nationality	Tonnage (GRT)	Fate
30 April 1944	William S. Thayer	United States	7,176	Sunk
18 August 1944	Lennox	Norway	50	Sunk

== Bibliography ==
- Busch, Rainer; Röll, Hans-Joachim (1999). German U-boat commanders of World War II : a biographical dictionary. Translated by Brooks, Geoffrey. London, Annapolis, Md: Greenhill Books, Naval Institute Press. ISBN 1-55750-186-6.
- Busch, Rainer; Röll, Hans-Joachim (1999). Der U-Boot-Krieg, 1939-1945: Deutsche U-Boot-Verluste von September 1939 bis Mai 1945 [German U-boat losses from September 1939 to May 1945] (in German). Vol. IV. Hamburg, Berlin, Bonn: Mittler. ISBN 3-8132-0514-2.
- Gröner, Erich; Jung, Dieter; Maass, Martin (1991). U-boats and Mine Warfare Vessels. German Warships 1815–1945. Vol. 2. Translated by Thomas, Keith; Magowan, Rachel. London: Conway Maritime Press. ISBN 0-85177-593-4.
- Kemp, Paul (1999). U-Boats Destroyed - German Submarine Losses in the World Wars. London: Arms & Armour. ISBN 1-85409-515-3.
