= German weather ship WBS 3 Carl J. Busch =

Ship built in 1925

History

Germany
- Name: Grohm (1925–29); Carl J. Busch (1929–56); Meløytrål (1956–79)
- Owner: Deutsche Hochseefischerei Bremen-Cuxhaven AG (1925–39); Kriegsmarine (1939–44)
- Port of registry: (Weimar Republic) Cuxhaven, Germany (1925–35); (Nazi Germany) Cuxhaven (1935–39); (Nazi Germany) Kriegsmarine (1939–45); Allied-occupied Germany (1945–49); West Germany (1949–56); Norway (1956–79)
- Builder: Reiherstieg Schiffswerfte & Maschinenfabrik AG
- Yard number: 558
- Launched: 14 April 1925
- Completed: June 1925
- Identification: Fishing registration HC 143 (1925–39); Code Letters RFLV (1925–34); Code Letters DIAW (1934–39); V 242, V 1112, WBS 3 (World War II); IMO number: 5231836 (1960s–79)
- Fate: Scrapped 1979

General characteristics
- Class & type: Fishing trawler (1925–39, 1945–79); Vorpostenboot (World War II); Weather ship (World War II)
- Tonnage: 305 GRT, 101 NRT–
- Length: 43.28 metres (142 ft 0 in)
- Beam: 7.62 metres (25 ft 0 in)
- Depth: 3.68 metres (12 ft 1 in)
- Installed power: Diesel engine, 208 nhp
- Propulsion: Single screw propeller
- Speed: 10 knots (19 km/h)

Carl J. Busch was a fishing trawler that was built as Grohm in 1925 by Reiherstieg Schiffswerfte & Maschinenfabrik AG, Hamburg for the Deutsche Hochseefischerei Bremen-Cuxhaven AG. She was requisitioned by the Kriegsmarine in 1939, serving as a Vorpostenboot and a weather ship during World War II. She was sold to Norway in 1956 and renamed Meløytrål, serving until 1979 when she was scrapped.

== Description ==
The ship was 43.28 metres (142 ft 0 in) with a beam of 7.62 metres (25 ft 0 in). She had a depth of 3.68 metres (12 ft 1 in). The ship was powered by a 6-cylinder four-stroke, single-cycle, single-action diesel engine which was built by the Großmotoren-Werke Hamburg-Mannheim GmbH, Hamburg. It was rated at 208nhp and drove a single screw propeller. The ship's speed was 10 knots (19 km/h).

== History ==
The ship was built in 1925 by Reiherstieg Schiffswerfte & Maschinenfabrik AG, Hamburg as the fishing trawler Grohm for the Deutsche Hochseefischerei Bremen-Cuxhaven AG. She was built as yard number 558, being launched on 14 April 1925 and completed in June the same year. Her port of registry was Cuxhaven. The fishing registration HC 143, and Code Letters RFLV were allocated. She had been renamed Carl J. Busch by 1930. With the change of Code Letters in 1934, Carl J. Busch was allocated the letters DIAW.

In 1939, Carl J. Busch was requisitioned by the Kriegsmarine. She was converted to a Vorpostenboot, serving as V 242 Carl J. Busch and later as V 1112 Carl J. Busch.

She was subsequently converted to a weather ship and was commissioned as WBS 3 Carl J. Busch On 15 September 1943, Carl J. Busch departed from Kiel, Germany for Tromsø and Hammerfest, Norway. She sailed from Hammerfest on 15 October escorted by U-355, bound for West Spitsbergen, where a weather station was to be set up. She ran aground in Woodfjord and her supplies were unloaded. She was later refloated and departed with her escort on 19 October.

Carl J. Busch was subsequently strengthened to enable her to operate in ice. She sailed from Sassnitz, Germany for Narvik, Norway. She unloaded stores bound for Wahlingbergfjorden, which were loaded onto a U-boat and loaded stores which had been brought to Narvik by WBS 8 Hessen. She then sailed to Tromsø and Hammerfest where the weather party was embarked, half on Carl J. Busch and half on U-307. The ships sailed on 10 September for Nordaustlandet, Spitsbergen as part of Operation Haudegen. The two vessels arrived on 14 September; they departed on 29 September.

In 1956, Carl J. Busch was sold to Norway and was renamed Meløytrål. With the introduction of IMO Numbers in the mid-1960s, she was allocated the IMO Number 5231836. She was scrapped in November 1979, by Høvding Skipsopphugning in Sandnessjøen, Norway.
