= Paleontologisk Museum =

Paleontological museum in Oslo, Norway

Coordinates: 59°55′12″N 10°46′16″E

The Paleontological Museum (Paleontologiske samlinger) contains the largest collection of fossils in Norway. It is part of the Natural History Museum at the University of Oslo.

The principal focus is on fossils from the Lower Palaeozoic rocks of the Oslo Region, the Norwegian continental shelf and from the Arctic Archipelago. The collection includes fossils and sedimentary rocks from both the Arctic and Antarctic regions. Large collections are from Svalbard, as well as specimens from Greenland, Canada and Russia. The collection is estimated to consist of over 1 million samples, including fossils of invertebrates from the Permian geologic period. Fossils of vertebrates include fossils from Svalbard of early fish from the Devonian geologic period. Post-glacial fossils and sediment samples from Norway are represented, as are Devonian plant fossils, principally from the Arctic region of Canada.

== See also ==
- Paleontology
