= Miseryfjellet =

Tallest peak of Bear Island, Svalbard

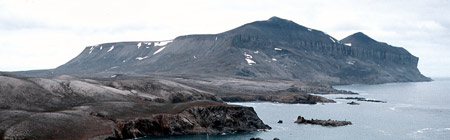

Highest point
- Elevation: 536 m (1,759 ft)
- Prominence: 536 m (1,759 ft)
- Coordinates: 74°26′N 19°10′E

Geography
- Location within Svalbard
- Location: Bear Island, Barents Sea, Norway

Miseryfjellet (Misery Mountain), at 536 metres (1,759 ft), is the tallest peak on Bear Island (Bjørnøya) of the Norwegian Svalbard archipelago in the Barents Sea. Miseryfjellet is on the eastern side of Bear Island and contains three distinct component peaks, Urd, Verdande and Skuld. These peaks are named after the three Norns in Norse Mythology. The name Bear Island is derived from the seasonal presence of polar bears, Ursus maritimus, whose population in the Barents Sea region is a genetically distinct sub-population of this species.

== Sources ==
- Bear Island: Description (1999)
- C. Michael Hogan (2008) Polar Bear: Ursus maritimus, globalTwitcher.com, ed. Nicklas Stromberg
