= Hambergfjellet Formation =

Geologic formation in Norway

- Stratigraphic range: Permian
- Type: Formation

Location
- Country: Norway

The Hambergfjellet Formation is a geologic formation in Norway. It preserves fossils dating back to the Permian period.

== See also ==
- List of fossiliferous stratigraphic units in Norway
