= Bjørnøya =

Southernmost island of Svalbard, Norway

Bear Island
Native name: Bjørnøya
- Bear Island is located north of mainland Norway, in the south of the Norwegian Svalbard archipelago

Geography
- Location: Norwegian Sea and Barents Sea
- Coordinates: 74°26′24″N 19°02′51″E
- Area: 178 km^{2} (69 sq mi)
- Highest elevation: 536 m (1759 ft)
- Highest point: Urd, Miseryfjellet

Administration
- Norway

Demographics
- Population: 9, semi-permanent inhabitants

Ramsar Wetland
- Official name: Bear Island
- Designated: 12 November 2010
- Reference no.: 1966

Bear Island (Norwegian: Bjørnøya, pronounced [ˈbjø̀ːɳœʏɑ]) is the southernmost island of the Norwegian Svalbard archipelago. The island is located at the limits of the Norwegian and Barents seas, approximately halfway between Spitsbergen and the North Cape. Bear Island was discovered by Dutch explorers Willem Barentsz and Jacob van Heemskerck on 10 June 1596. It was named after a polar bear that was seen swimming nearby. The island was considered terra nullius until the Spitsbergen Treaty of 1920 placed it under Norwegian sovereignty.

Despite its remote location and barren nature, the island has seen commercial activities in past centuries, such as coal mining, fishing and whaling. However, no settlements have lasted more than a few years, and Bear Island is now uninhabited except for personnel working at the island's meteorological station Bjørnøya radio. Along with the adjacent waters, it was declared a nature reserve in 2002.

== History ==
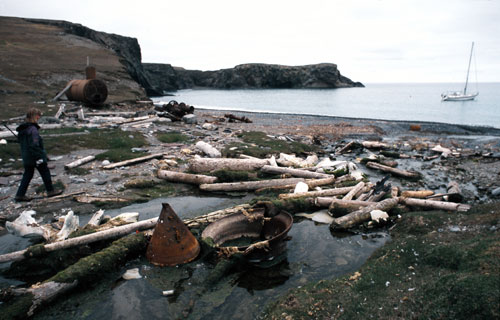
Remnants of a whaling station at Kvalrossbukta, Bear Island

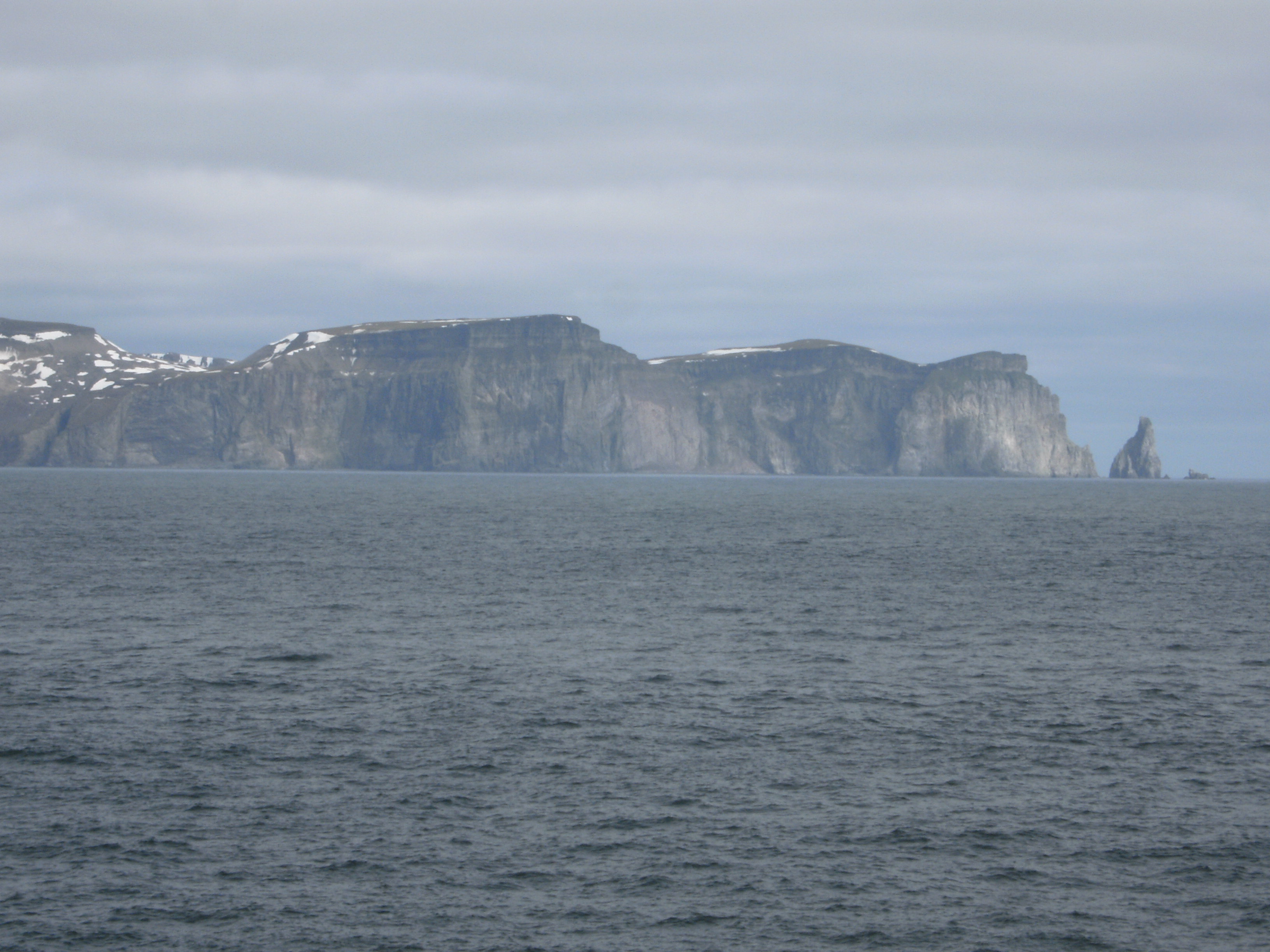
Bear Island (Norway)

Seafarers of the Viking era may have known Bear Island, but the documented history begins in 1596, when Willem Barentsz sighted the island on his third expedition. He named this island "Vogel Eylandt", "Bird Island" in English. Steven Bennet conducted further exploration in 1603 and 1604 and noted the then rich population of walrus. Starting in the early 17th century, the island was used mainly as a base for the hunting of walrus and other species of seals. Also, the eggs of seabirds were harvested from the large bird colonies until 1971.

The Muscovy Company claimed Bear Island for the English Crown in 1609, but it abandoned the site when walrus-hunting declined. A Russian settlement existed in the 18th century and its remains were later used as a basis for territorial claims by Imperial Russia in 1899 and again by the Soviet Union in 1947.

Bear Island has never been extensively settled. The remnants of a whaling station from the early 20th century can be seen at Kvalrossbukta ("walrus bay") in the southeast. From 1916 through 1925, coal was mined at a small settlement named Tunheim on the northeastern coast, but then the mining was given up as unprofitable. Due to the cold climate, the remains of the settlement, including a half-destroyed jetty and a steam locomotive, are relatively well-preserved.

The strategic value of Bear Island was recognised in the late 19th century, when Imperial Russia and Imperial Germany demonstrated their interests in the Barents Sea. The German journalist and adventurer Theodor Lerner visited the island in 1898 and 1899 and claimed rights of ownership. In 1899, the German fishery association Deutscher Seefischerei-Verein (DSV) started investigations of whaling and fishery in the Barents Sea. The DSV was secretly in contact with the German naval command and considered the possibility of an occupation of Bear Island. In reaction to these advances, the Russian Navy sent out the protected cruiser Svetlana to investigate, and the Russians hoisted their flag over Bear Island on 21 July 1899. Although Lerner protested the action, no violence occurred and the matter was settled diplomatically with no definitive claims of sovereignty over Bear Island by any nation.

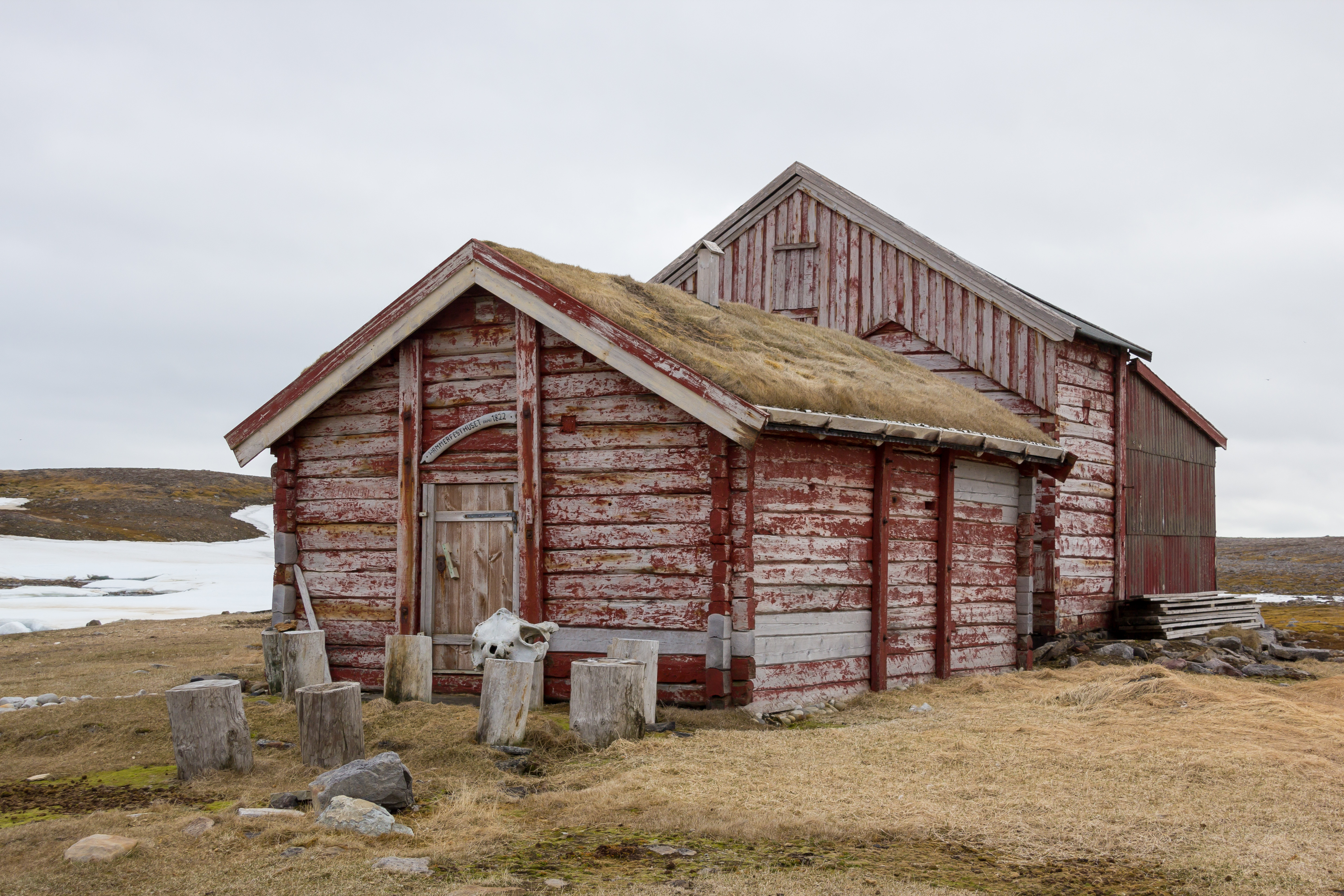
Hammerfest house from 1822

The whole island was privately owned by the coal mining company of Bjørnøen AS from 1918 to 1932, when the Norwegian state took over the shares. Bjørnøen AS now exists as a state-owned company, and it is jointly managed with Kings Bay AS, the company that runs the operations of Ny-Ålesund on Spitsbergen. A Norwegian radio station (Bjørnøya Radio, callsign: LJB) was established in Herwighamna on the northern coast in 1919. It was later extended to include a meteorological station.

In 1932 and 1933, the island was a site of the first Polish polar expedition, related to the second International Polar Year. Three researchers—Czesław Centkiewicz (who later recounted the expedition in his book Wyspa Mgieł i Wichrów), Władysław Łysakowski and Stanisław Siedlecki stayed there for an entire winter conducting meteorological and geophysical observations.

Since the shipping routes from the Atlantic Ocean to the ports of the arctic White Sea pass through the Barents Sea, the waters near Bear Island were of some strategic importance during World War II as well as during the Cold War. Although Svalbard was not occupied by Germany, the Kriegsmarine built several weather stations there as part of Operation Haudegen. An automated radio station was deployed on Bjørnøya in 1941. German forces attacked several arctic convoys with military supplies bound for the Soviet Union in the waters surrounding Bear Island. They inflicted heavy losses upon Convoy PQ 17 of June/July 1942, but they were ineffective in the Battle of the Barents Sea on New Year's Eve 1942. The waters southeast of Bear Island were the scene of more naval battles in 1943.

In November 1944, the Soviet Union proposed to annul the Spitsbergen Treaty with the intention of gaining sovereignty over Bear Island. Negotiations with Trygve Lie of the Norwegian government-in-exile did not lead to an agreement by the end of World War II, and the Soviet proposals were never carried out. The Soviet Union (and later, Russia) maintained some presence on Spitsbergen, however.

In 2002 a nature reserve was established that covers all of the island, except 1.2 square kilometres (0.46 sq mi) around the meteorological station. The reserve also includes the adjacent waters of a four-nautical-mile (seven-kilometre) radius from the coast. In 2008, the decision was made to extend the reserve to a radius of 12 nautical miles (22 kilometres) from the coast covering 177 square kilometres (68 sq mi) on land and 2,805 square kilometres (818 sq nmi) of sea area. Today, the island's only inhabitants are the nine staff members of the Norwegian meteorological station and radio station at Herwighamna. This station carries out meteorological observations and provides logistic and telecommunication services, including a radio watch on the HF channels 2182/2168 and the VHF channels 16/12. Weather forecasts are transmitted from the station twice daily, announced on HF 2182/VHF 16 at 10:05 am/pm UTC. A non-directional beacon at 74°30'7.0"N 019°5'10.2"E, identification BJO transmits on 316 kHz (Morse identifier - . . . . - - - - - -). The station also has landing platforms for use by helicopters of the Norwegian Coast Guard, the Norwegian 330 Squadron, and the Governor of Svalbard. The Norwegian Polar Institute conducts annual expeditions to Bear Island, mostly concerned with ornithological research. Several other research projects, mostly pertaining to geography and climatology, are carried out less regularly. There are very few opportunities for individual travel to Bjørnøya.

Amateur radio operators occasionally conduct DXpeditions on the island during the summer months.

The first recorded case of the COVID-19 pandemic in Svalbard occurred on Bear Island on 6 October 2021. A Russian fisherman had been confirmed to have contracted the disease and was transported via helicopter to Longyearbyen to be treated at its hospital, where he made a full recovery. There have been 0 confirmed deaths from COVID-19 in Svalbard as of 2023.

== Geography ==
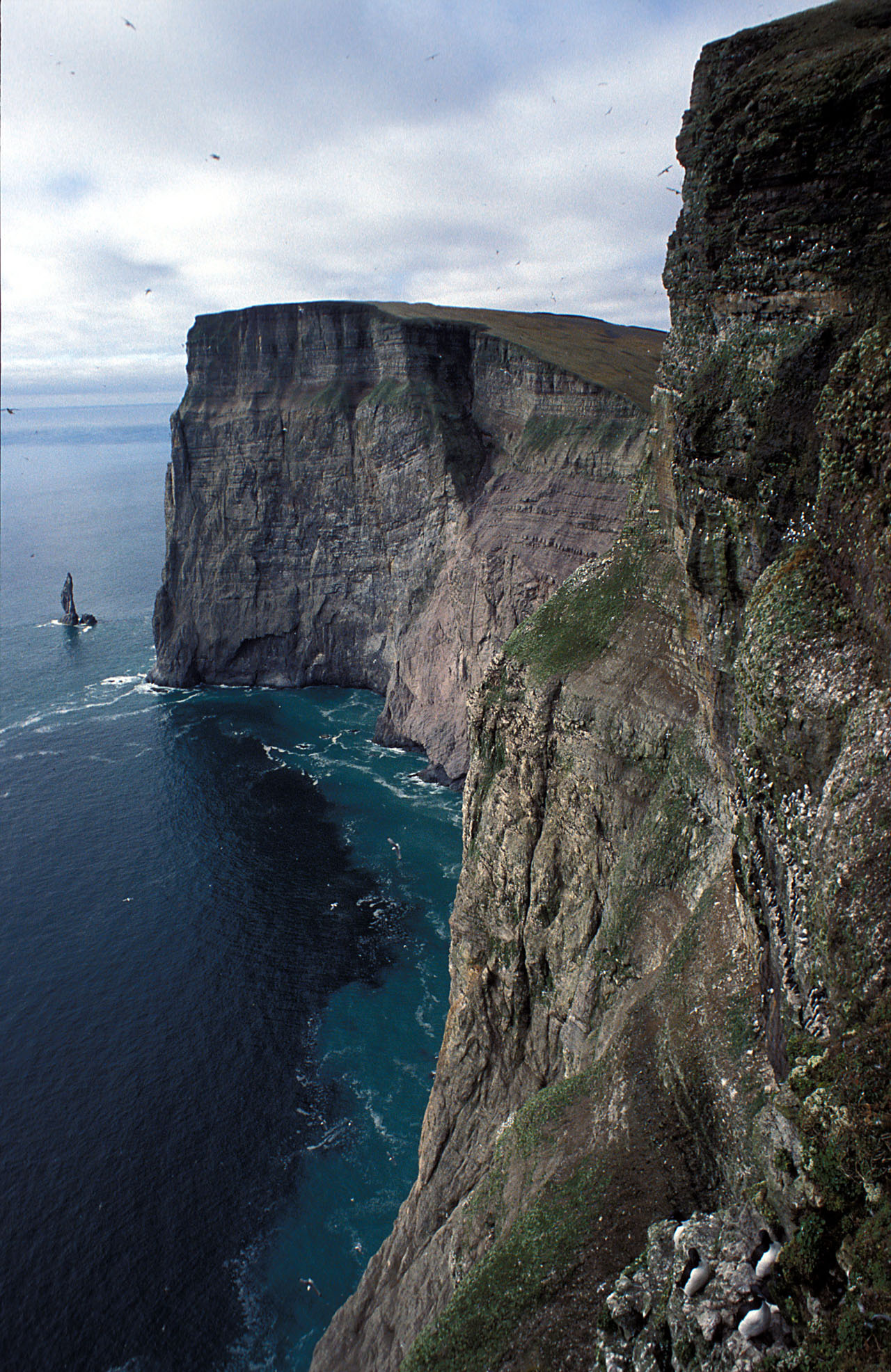
Stappen bird cliffs

Bear Island lies about 235 kilometres (127 nmi) south of mainland Spitsbergen and 397 kilometres (214 nmi) north-northwest of Ingøy in mainland Norway. It is located at the limits of the Norwegian and Barents Seas on Spitsbergen Bank, which extends southward from Spitsbergen and Edgeøya, forming a part of the continental shelf.

The island's outline is an approximate triangle pointing south with a greatest north–south extension of 20 kilometres (12 mi) and a greatest east-west extension of 15.5 kilometres (9 3/4 mi). Its surface area is 178 square kilometres (69 sq mi). The southern part of Bjørnøya is mountainous, the highest top being Miseryfjellet on the southeast coast at about 536 metres (1,759 ft) above sea level.

Other notable mountains are Antarcticfjellet in the southeast, and Fuglefjellet, Hambergfjellet and Alfredfjellet in the southwest. The northern part of the island forms a rocky, lowland plain that covers some two thirds of the surface area.

Apart from a few sandy beaches, the coast is mostly steep, with high cliffs and notable signs of erosion such as caverns and isolated rock pillars. A number of anchorages and landing points exist, as well as a small harbor at Herwighamna on the north coast.

=== Geology and palaeontology ===
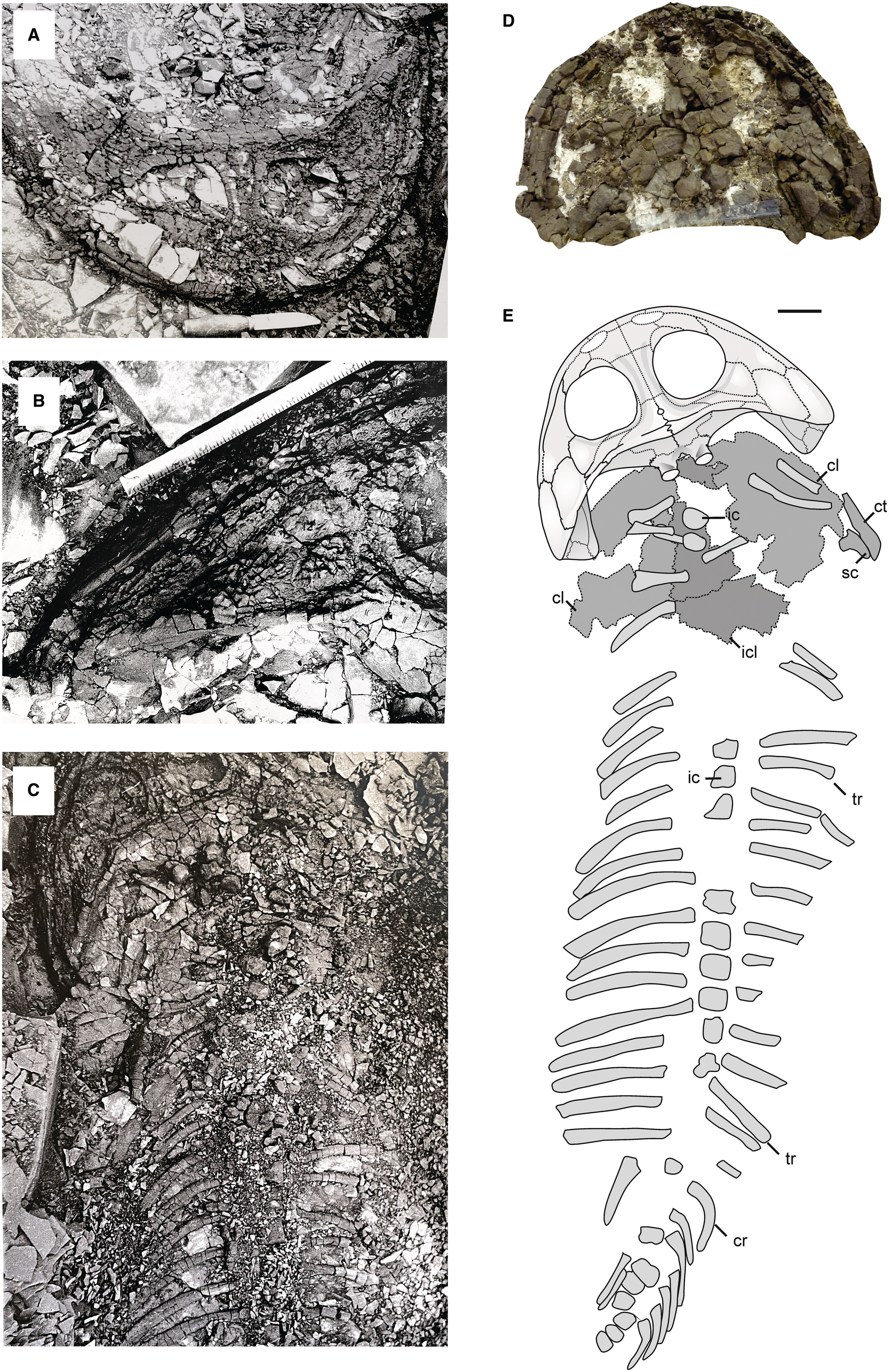
Skeleton of Arctobatrachus a giant over 2 metres (6 ft 7 in) long amphibian known from Triassic strata on Bear Island

Bear Island is primarily composed of mid-late Palaeozoic aged sedimentary rocks spanning from the Devonian to Permian, unconformably overlying an Ordovician-late Precambrian aged basement of dolomite ("Hecla Hoek"), which forms the immediate below-soil bedrock on the southern part of the island. These mid-late Palaeozoic sedimentary rocks include from the oldest to youngest, the Billefjorden Group, including coal-bearing siliciclastic sedimentary rock deposited in terrestrial alluvial fans and floodplains spanning the late Devonian (Famennian)-early Carboniferous (Viséan), the Gipsdalen Group, which includes predominantly carbonate rocks deposited in a shallow marine setting and evaporites, spanning the early-mid Carboniferous boundary (Serpukhovian/Bashkirian) to earliest Permian (Asselian), as well as the Bjarmeland and Tempelfjorden groups, spanning the Permian, which include siliciclastics and carbonates, showing increasing water depth relative to earlier periods. A small area of Triassic aged rocks, predominantly shale, is also exposed on the east of the island, spanning the Early-Middle Triassic. This strata, which was deposited in shallow marine-deltaic environments, is fossiliferous, including the remains of fish, ammonoids, echinoderms, brachiopods, gastropods, bivalves, as well as the giant amphibian Arctobatrachus, which had a body length well over 2 metres (6.6 ft).

=== Hydrography ===
Norwegian government agencies have conducted hydrographic surveys of Svalbard waters throughout the 20th century. The responsibility fell to the Norges Svalbard- og Ishavsundersøkelser in 1928, its successor, the Norwegian Polar Institute from 1948, and the Norwegian Hydrographic Service from 1984. Land surveying and mapping are the responsibilities of the Polar Institute.

Water depths near the island and to the north and east do not much exceed 100 metres (328 ft), but become much greater to the south, and especially some 55 kilometres (30 nautical miles) to the west, where the continental shelf slopes into the deep water of the Norwegian Sea and Greenland Sea.

The lowland is strewn with shallow freshwater lakes that cover about 19 square kilometres (7.3 sq mi) in all. Several streams flow into the ocean, often via waterfalls along the steeper parts of the coast.

=== Climate ===
Bear Island, located well south of the main islands in the Svalbard Archipelago, has the mildest climate in Svalbard. A branch of the North Atlantic current carries warm water to the west of Svalbard, passing Bear Island on its way. This influences climate, making it much warmer than other polar regions at similar latitude. Bear Island's climate is maritime and polar (Köppen ET) with relatively high temperatures during the winter, and a large amount of precipitation. The large winter precipitation is very unusual in a high polar region, a result of Atlantic Lows sometimes going this far northeast due to open sea southwest of Bear Island. The record high 23.6 °C (74.5 °F) was recorded June 1953. The record low −31.6 °C (−24.9 °F) is from March 1927. The annual mean temperature was −0.4 °C (31.3 °F) in the period 1991–2020, thus threatening to melt permafrost on the island; by comparison, the annual mean temperature was −2.4 °C (27.7 °F) in the period 1961–1990.

While winters are very long, the maritime moderation and the delay of salt water ice formation makes Bear Island have far fewer cold winters than a lot of mid-latitude climates on the larger continental landmasses. In summer, the maritime influence causes seasonal lag. This means that August is slightly milder than July, which is extremely uncommon at high latitudes. The seasonal lag is extreme in the winter with the coldest month being March, and April being colder than November.

The weather can be quite stable during summer months, although foggy conditions are common, occurring during 20% of all days in July. Fog develops when the warm air of the Atlantic Ocean, from farther south, passes over cold water. The average monthly precipitation is lowest in May, and highest in September and October.

Because Bear Island lies at a boundary between cold water of polar origin and warmer Atlantic water, water temperatures within a few dozen nautical miles of the island are quite variable, sometimes reaching 10 °C (50 °F) in summer. During the winter fast ice develops on the coast, but it is rare on the open sea around Bear Island. The Barents Sea carries pack ice to Bjørnøya every winter, but a significant amount of ice is not common before February.

The polar night lasts from about November 8 through February 3, and the period of midnight sun from about May 2 through August 11. With just 595 hours of bright sunshine per year, Bear Island has the lowest average yearly sunshine in Europe.

Climate data for Bear Island 1991–2020 (16 m, extremes 1910–2020)
Month	Jan	Feb	Mar	Apr	May	Jun	Jul	Aug	Sep	Oct	Nov	Dec	Year
Record high °C (°F)	5.3 (41.5)	5.0 (41.0)	6.2 (43.2)	8.1 (46.6)	16.5 (61.7)	23.6 (74.5)	22.8 (73.0)	22.5 (72.5)	15.5 (59.9)	11.6 (52.9)	8.4 (47.1)	6.4 (43.5)	23.6 (74.5)
Mean daily maximum °C (°F)	−2.3 (27.9)	−2.8 (27.0)	−3.0 (26.6)	−1.4 (29.5)	1.5 (34.7)	4.5 (40.1)	7.2 (45.0)	7.3 (45.1)	5.5 (41.9)	2.2 (36.0)	0.2 (32.4)	−1.2 (29.8)	1.5 (34.7)
Daily mean °C (°F)	−4.6 (23.7)	−5.1 (22.8)	−5.4 (22.3)	−3.5 (25.7)	−0.2 (31.6)	2.9 (37.2)	5.3 (41.5)	5.7 (42.3)	4.1 (39.4)	0.7 (33.3)	−1.4 (29.5)	−3.4 (25.9)	−0.4 (31.3)
Mean daily minimum °C (°F)	−7.3 (18.9)	−7.7 (18.1)	−8.0 (17.6)	−5.7 (21.7)	−1.7 (28.9)	1.5 (34.7)	3.8 (38.8)	4.2 (39.6)	2.7 (36.9)	−1.0 (30.2)	−3.5 (25.7)	−5.7 (21.7)	−2.4 (27.7)
Record low °C (°F)	−29.8 (−21.6)	−29.1 (−20.4)	−31.6 (−24.9)	−25.6 (−14.1)	−17.7 (0.1)	−8.4 (16.9)	−4.7 (23.5)	−2.4 (27.7)	−10.4 (13.3)	−22.2 (−8.0)	−25.1 (−13.2)	−28.1 (−18.6)	−31.6 (−24.9)
Average precipitation mm (inches)	48.0 (1.89)	41.7 (1.64)	41.6 (1.64)	31.7 (1.25)	25.0 (0.98)	19.7 (0.78)	27.4 (1.08)	32.4 (1.28)	47.2 (1.86)	40.2 (1.58)	46.0 (1.81)	50.4 (1.98)	451.3 (17.77)
Source 1: yr.no/Norwegian Meteorological Institute/eklima (means, precipitation, extremes)
Source 2: Meteostat (average high/low)

Earlier climate normal for Bear Island with sunhours

Climate data for Bear Island, Norway 1961-1990
Month	Jan	Feb	Mar	Apr	May	Jun	Jul	Aug	Sep	Oct	Nov	Dec	Year
Mean daily maximum °C (°F)	−5.0 (23.0)	−4.7 (23.5)	−4.8 (23.4)	−2.9 (26.8)	0.3 (32.5)	3.6 (38.5)	6.6 (43.9)	6.3 (43.3)	4.2 (39.6)	1.2 (34.2)	−1.7 (28.9)	−4.3 (24.3)	−0.1 (31.8)
Daily mean °C (°F)	−7 (19)	−7 (19)	−7 (19)	−4 (25)	0 (32)	2 (36)	4 (39)	4 (39)	3 (37)	0 (32)	−3 (27)	−6 (21)	−2 (29)
Mean daily minimum °C (°F)	−11.4 (11.5)	−10.9 (12.4)	−10.5 (13.1)	−8.0 (17.6)	−3.0 (26.6)	0.4 (32.7)	2.8 (37.0)	3.0 (37.4)	1.3 (34.3)	−2.3 (27.9)	−6.0 (21.2)	−9.9 (14.2)	−4.5 (23.8)
Average precipitation mm (inches)	30 (1.2)	33 (1.3)	28 (1.1)	21 (0.8)	18 (0.7)	23 (0.9)	30 (1.2)	36 (1.4)	44 (1.7)	44 (1.7)	33 (1.3)	31 (1.2)	371 (14.5)
Average precipitation days	9	9	9	6	5	6	7	7	10	10	9	9	96
Average relative humidity (%)	87	88	88	87	88	90	92	91	89	86	87	88	88
Mean monthly sunshine hours	0	6	57	105	116	105	79	70	42	15	0	0	595
Source 1: http://www.theweathernetwork.com/index.php?product=statistics&pagecontent=C00009
Source 2: met-no/met.no/eklima

=== Flora and fauna ===
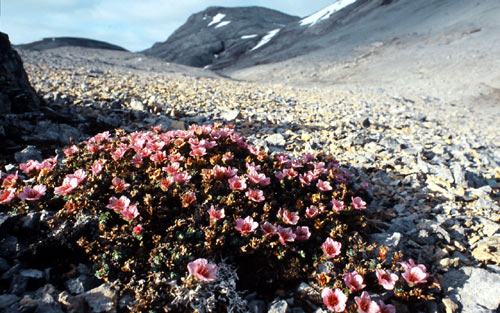
Purple saxifrage is well-suited to Bjørnøya's climate

Victor Summerhayes and Charles Elton visited Bear Island during the 1921 Oxford University Spitsbergen expedition and the location formed the basis of their pioneering ecological study which produced one of the first food web diagrams. There is a little plant growth, consisting mostly of moss and some scurvy grass, but no trees.

The only indigenous land mammals are a few Arctic foxes. Despite its name, Bear Island is not a permanent residence of polar bears, although many arrive with the expanding pack ice in the winter. Occasionally, a bear will stay behind when the ice retreats in spring and remain through the summer months. Moreover, the sub-population of polar bears found here is a genetically distinct set of polar bears associated with the Barents Sea region.

Ringed seal and bearded seal, prey of the polar bear, live in the waters near Bjørnøya, but the formerly common walruses have nowadays become guests. Bear Island's freshwater lakes host a population of Arctic char.

==== Birds ====
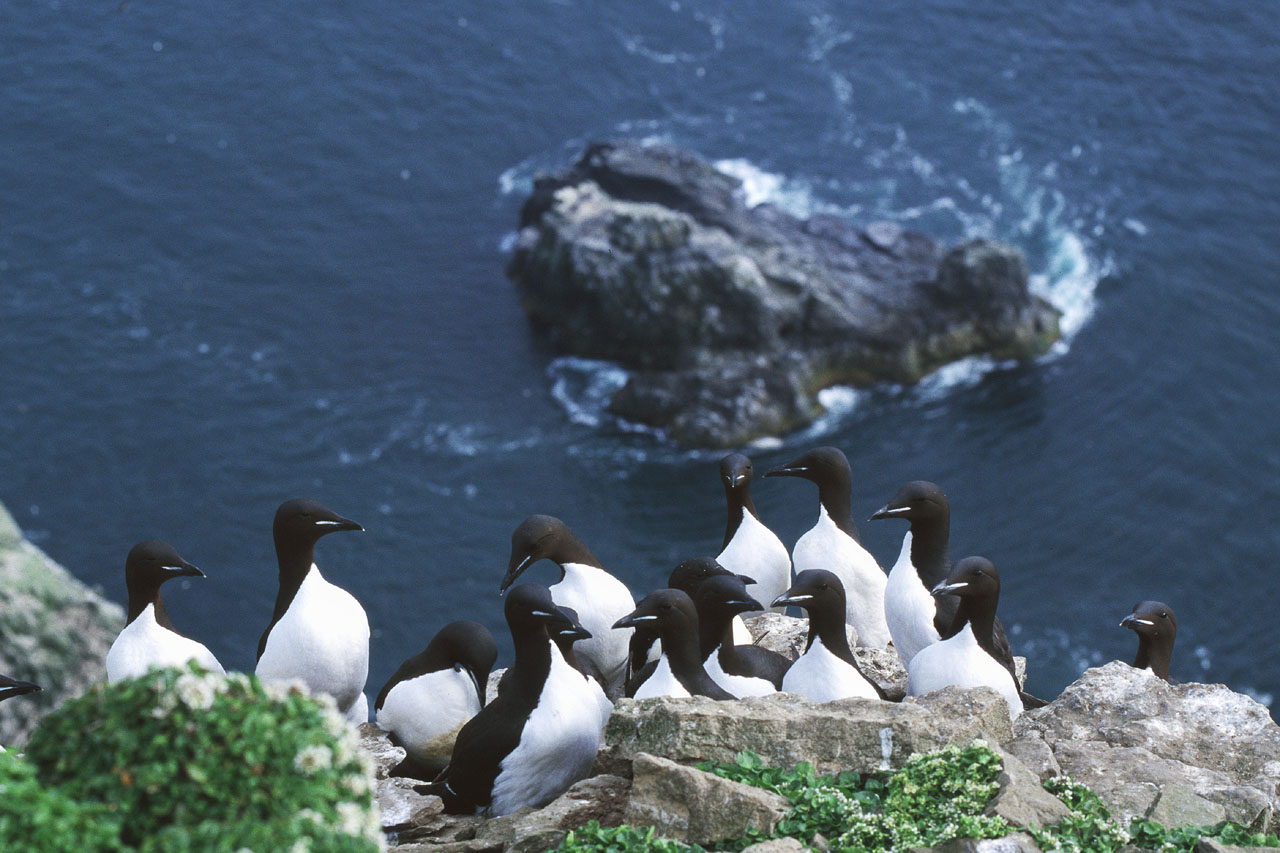
Sea birds on Bear Island

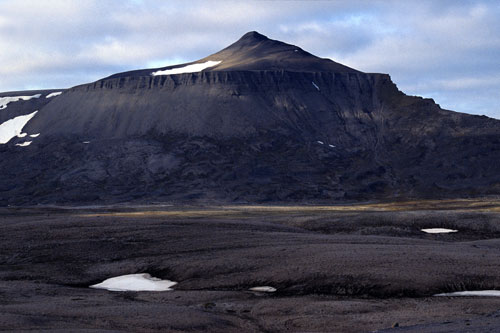
Miseryfjellet, the tallest peak at 536 metres (1,759 ft)

The only land bird of significant numbers on the island is the snow bunting which arrive in the early spring to breed. However, the island is rich in seabirds nesting on the southern cliffs. Other species visit the island during their seasonal migration between Svalbard's northern islands and mainland Europe. The only permanent resident appears to be the northern fulmar.

Bear island has been identified as an Important Bird Area (IBA) by BirdLife International. It supports breeding populations of northern fulmars (50,000–60,000 pairs), purple sandpipers, red phalaropes (10 pairs), glaucous gulls (2000 pairs), black-legged kittiwakes (100,000 pairs), little auks (10,000–100,000 pairs), common guillemots (50,000 pairs), thick-billed guillemots (190,000 individuals) and black guillemots (1000 pairs).

It also supports migratory populations of pink-footed geese (30,000 individuals), barnacle geese and long-tailed ducks.

== Environmental concerns ==
Although there are currently no industrial activities on Bjørnøya or in its immediate vicinity, pollution by toxic and radioactive substances remains a threat to the island's virtually untouched nature. Exploration in the Barents sea and the recent development of the Snøhvit gas field off the northern coast of Norway shows that the ecologically sensitive polar and subpolar sea areas of the Norwegian and Barents Sea have come into the focus of the petrol and gas industry. The environmental organisation Bellona has criticised the Norwegian government for licensing these activities without sufficient studies of their ecological impact. Organic toxins, specifically PCBs, have been found in high concentrations in biological samples from Bear Island, especially in Arctic char of the freshwater lake Ellasjøen. The Soviet nuclear submarine Komsomolets sank on 7 April 1989, some 135 nautical miles (250 km) southwest of Bear Island. Leakage of radioactive material from the reactor and nuclear warheads currently poses a problem, and severe pollution of the surrounding waters remains possible.

== Culture ==
Surfing has been documented in the movie Bjørnøya – følg drømmen.

== Books ==
The Last Bear, a storybook by Hannah Gold, features Bear Island and Svalbard. The story depicts a girl named April who must, with her father, go to the Arctic to research for a duration of 6 months. During these 6 months, April secretly helps a wounded bear to escape the island to Svalbard.

Bear Island is a thriller novel by Scottish author Alistair MacLean, originally published in 1971. The book is a murder mystery set on the island, tying into its World War II history. In 1979 it was adapted into a film bearing the same name, starring Donald Sutherland, Vanessa Redgrave and Richard Widmark.

In Tom Clancy's second bestselling novel Red Storm Rising, Bear Island gets a brief mention as one of many locations where invading Soviet forces battle NATO defenders, in this case to more easily move naval forces into the Atlantic Ocean.

== See also ==
- List of islands of Norway
