= List of shipwrecks in April 1944 =

The list of shipwrecks in April 1944 includes ships sunk, foundered, grounded, or otherwise lost during April 1944.

== 1 April ==
List of shipwrecks: 1 April 1944
Ship	State	Description
Dahomian	United Kingdom	World War II: The cargo ship (5,277 GRT) was torpedoed and sunk in the South Atlantic 10 nautical miles (19 km) west south west of Cape Point, South Africa (34°25′S 18°19′E) by U-852 (Kriegsmarine) with the loss of two of her 51 crew. Survivors were rescued by HMSAS Krugersdorp and HMSAS Natalia (both South African Navy).
Jared Ingersoll	United States	World War II: Convoy UGS 36: The Liberty ship was torpedoed and damaged in the Mediterranean Sea west of Algiers, Algeria by Luftwaffe aircraft. She was abandoned by her crew, who were rescued by USS Mills (United States Navy). USS Mills and the tug HMS Mindfull (Royal Navy) towed the ship to Algiers where she was beached. Later repaired and returned to service.
Mantai	Japan	World War II: The coaster was sunk by gunfire and demolition charges in the Strait of Malacca by HMS Truculent (Royal Navy).
Minami Maru	Japan	World War II: The cargo ship (2,398 GRT) was torpedoed and sunk in the Pacific Ocean (25°59′N 131°19′E) by USS Flying Fish (United States Navy).
UJ 2127 Theodoros	Kriegsmarine	World War II: The auxiliary submarine chaser was bombed and sunk off Kalamata, Greece (37°01′N 22°05′E) by British aircraft with the loss of four lives.

== 2 April ==
List of shipwrecks: 2 April 1944
Ship	State	Description
Akebono Maru No. 3	Japan	World War II: The transport ship was sunk in an air raid on Truk by Consolidated B-24 Liberator and North American B-25 Mitchell aircraft of the United States Seventh Air Force.
Kejserinde Dagmar	Denmark	World War II: The cargo ship struck a mine and sank in the Ems. She was on a voyage from Copenhagen to Bremen, Germany.
HMS LCA(HR) 672	Royal Navy	The landing craft assault (8.5/11.5 t, 1943) foundered during an exercise off Great Britain.
HMS LCA(HR) 811	Royal Navy	The landing craft assault (8.5/11.5 t, 1943) foundered during an exercise off Great Britain.
U-360	Kriegsmarine	World War II: The Type VIIC submarine was depth charged and sunk in the Norwegian Sea south west of Bear Island, Norway (72°28′N 13°04′E) by HMS Keppel (Royal Navy) with the loss of all 51 crew.

== 3 April ==
List of shipwrecks: 3 April 1944
Ship	State	Description
Fagerstrand I	Germany	World War II: The factory ship (191 GRT, 1923) was set on fire and severely damaged in Kåfjord following an Allied attack on Tirpitz (Kriegsmarine). The wreck was laid up, and scuttled in October 1944 by German forces. Raised in 1947, extended and returned to service in 1950 as Sande.
I-O-78	Kriegsmarine	The Siebelgefäß landing craft was sunk on this date.
PiLB 425	Kriegsmarine	The PiLB 40 type landing craft (30 GRT) was wrecked when a storm threw it ahsore near Akkerman, Ukrain.
StuBo 1033	Kriegsmarine	The StuBo42 type landing craft/motor launch (8 GRT) was wrecked when a storm threw it ahsore near Balaklava, Crimea.
Suiten Maru	Imperial Japanese Navy	The auxiliary guard boat was lost on this date.
Tosei Maru	Japan	World War II: Convoy Higashi-Matsu ("East Pine") No. 4: The cargo liner was torpedoed and sunk in the Pacific Ocean off the Nanpō Islands (30°14′N 139°45′E) by USS Pollack (United States Navy). One passenger died.
U-288	Kriegsmarine	World War II: The Type VIIC submarine was depth charged and sunk in the Barents Sea (73°44′N 27°12′E) by Fairey Swordfish aircraft of 819 Squadron, Fleet Air Arm, based on HMS Activity and Grumman TBM Avenger and Grumman F4F Wildcat aircraft of 846 Squadron, Fleet Air Arm based on HMS Tracker (both Royal Navy) with the loss of all 49 crew.

== 4 April ==
List of shipwrecks: 4 April 1944
Ship	State	Description
Choun Maru	Imperial Japanese Army	World War II: The transport was sunk in an air raid on Rabaul, New Guinea by Consolidated B-24 Liberator and North American B-25 Mitchell aircraft of the United States Thirteenth Air Force.
I-169	Imperial Japanese Navy	World War II: The Kaidai-class submarine was sunk in a diving accident north-west of Dublon Island, Truk, during an air raid by Consolidated PBY-4 Liberator aircraft. All aboard died. 32 bodies were recovered in the following weeks.
Iwakuni Maru	Imperial Japanese Army	World War II: The transport was sunk in an air raid on Rabaul by Consolidated B-25 Liberator and North American B-25 Mitchell aircraft of the United States Thirteenth Air Force. 32 crew members were killed.
I-O-10	Kriegsmarine	The Siebelgefäß landing craft was sunk on this date.
Sperrbrecher 157	Kriegsmarine	World War II: The Sperrbrecher struck a mine and was severely damaged off Brest, Finistère, France.

== 5 April ==
List of shipwrecks: 5 April 1944
Ship	State	Description
CHa-46	Imperial Japanese Navy	World War II: The CHa-1-class auxiliary submarine chaser was sunk at Wake Island by Consolidated B-24 Liberator aircraft of VB-109, United States Navy.
R-261	Kriegsmarine	World War II: The Type R-218 minesweeper was sunk off Boulogne, Pas-de-Calais, France by Allied aircraft.
Tenryu Maru	Imperial Japanese Army	World War II: The transport was sunk in an air raid on Rabaul by Consolidated B-25 Liberator and North American B-25 Mitchell aircraft of the United States Thirteenth Air Force with the loss of 28 lives.
UJ 6070 Cetonia	Kriegsmarine	The armed yacht/submarine chaser was lost on this date.
USS YT-247	United States Navy	The harbor tug was swamped and foundered 425 nautical miles (787 km) south west of Oahu, Hawaii (14°14′N 158°59′E) while under tow from Pearl Harbor to Palmyra Island.

== 6 April ==
List of shipwrecks: 6 April 1944
Ship	State	Description
F 450	Kriegsmarine	The Type C2 Marinefährprahm was sunk on this date.
F 519	Kriegsmarine	World War II: The Type B Marinefährprahm was heavily damaged by Allied fighter-bombers off Piombino and grounded. One crew was killed and four wounded. The wreck was then sunk in Piombino by another air attack either on 7 or 19 April.
Hsing Yun Maru	Japan	World War II: The transport ship struck a mine and sank in the Yangtze-kiang.
HMS LCP(S) 9	Royal Navy	The landing craft personnel (small) (3/5.5 t, 1943) was wrecked at Weymouth, England.
R-192	Kriegsmarine	World War II: The Type R-151 minesweeper was sunk in the Tyrrhenian Sea off Cecina, Tuscany, Italy during a battle with Royal Navy motor torpedo boats.
Ruth I	Norway	World War II: Convoy SC 156: The cargo ship (3,531 GRT, 1900) was torpedoed and sunk in the Atlantic Ocean (45°05′N 35°11′W) by U-302 (Kriegsmarine) with the loss of three of her 39 crew. Survivors were rescued by HMS Chelmer (Royal Navy).
South America	Norway	World War II: Convoy SC 156: The tanker (6,246 GRT, 1931) was torpedoed and sunk in the Atlantic Ocean (45°04′N 35°22′W) by U-302 (Kriegsmarine). All 42 crew were rescued by Goodwin (United Kingdom).
U-302	Kriegsmarine	World War II: The Type VIIC submarine was depth charged and sunk in the Atlantic Ocean (45°05′N 35°11′W) by HMS Swale (Royal Navy) with the loss of all 51 crew.
U-455	Kriegsmarine	World War II: The Type VIIC submarine struck a mine and sank in the Ligurian Sea off Portofino, Genoa, Italy with the loss of all 51 crew.
Wesergau	Germany	World War II: The cargo ship was torpedoed and sunk in the Norwegian Sea off Stad, Norway by Ula (Royal Norwegian Navy).

== 7 April ==
List of shipwrecks: 7 April 1944
Ship	State	Description
Asien	Germany	World War II: The cargo ship was torpedoed and sunk in the North Sea off Lista, Norway (58°08′N 06°32′E) by HMS Unshaken (Royal Navy). All her crew were saved by an escort ship.
I-2	Imperial Japanese Navy	World War II: The Type J1 submarine was depth charged and sunk in the Bismarck Sea 50 nautical miles (93 km) west north west of New Hanover, off Emirau Island (02°17′S 149°14′E) by USS Saufley (United States Navy). Lost with all 111 hands.
Rion	Soviet Union	World War II: The barge struck a mine and sank in the Black Sea (42°11′N 41°38′E).
U-856	Kriegsmarine	World War II: The Type IX submarine was depth charged, shelled, rammed and sunk in the Atlantic Ocean (40°18′N 62°22′W) by USS Champlin and USS Huse (both United States Navy) with the loss of 27 of her 55 crew.

== 8 April ==
List of shipwrecks: 8 April 1944
Ship	State	Description
Aratama Maru	Imperial Japanese Navy	World War II: The Aratama Maru-class ammunition ship was torpedoed in the Pacific Ocean 7 nautical miles (13 km) east of Guam (13°16′N 145°11′E) by USS Seahorse (United States Navy). Her cargo of gasoline exploded damaging Asakaze (Imperial Japanese Navy). She drifted on fire for three days before coming to rest on a reef, and sinking partially submerged in shallow water, in Talafofo Bay on 11 April. Four crewmen were killed. She eventually sank completely post-war after damage from many typhoons over a number of years.
Enco	Italy	World War II: The cargo ship was sunk at Venice during an Allied air raid.
Nebraska	United Kingdom	World War II: The cargo ship (8,261 GRT, 1920) was torpedoed and sunk in the South Atlantic (11°55′S 19°52′W) by U-843 (Kriegsmarine) with the loss of two of the 68 people on board. Survivors were rescued by Kindat (United Kingdom) or reached land in their lifeboat.
U-2	Kriegsmarine	The Type IIA submarine collided with the trawler Helmi Söhle (Germany) in the Baltic Sea near Pillau, East Prussia and sank with the loss of seventeen of her 35 crew.
U-962	Kriegsmarine	World War II: The Type VIIC submarine was depth charged and sunk in the Atlantic Ocean north west of Cape Finisterre, Spain (45°43′N 19°57′W) by HMS Crane and HMS Cygnet (both Royal Navy) with the loss of all 50 crew.
V 622 Almuth	Kriegsmarine	World War II: The Vorpostenboot struck a mine and sank off Saint-Nazaire, Loire-Inférieure.

== 9 April ==
List of shipwrecks: 9 April 1944
Ship	State	Description
F 552	Kriegsmarine	The Type C2 Marinefährprahm was sunk on this date.
Hokurei Maru	Japan	World War II: The cargo ship struck a mine and sank in the South China Sea south of Hainan, China.
Honan Maru	Japan	World War II: The Type 1K Standard Merchant-class ore carrier was torpedoed and sunk in the East China Sea (33°50′N 128°01′E) by USS Whale (United States Navy) with all crew.
HMS LCP(S) 1026	Royal Navy	World War II: The landing craft personnel (small) was wrecked at Weymouth, England.
Mimasaka Maru	Japan	World War II: Convoy Higashi-Matsu ("East Pine") No. 4: The cargo ship was torpedoed and damaged in the Pacific Ocean off the Mariana Islands (15°30′N 145°00′E) by USS Seahorse (United States Navy). She sank the next day. Seven troops and eleven crewmen were killed.
PiLB 510	Kriegsmarine	The PiLB 41 type landing craft was lost on this date.
USS SC-984	United States Navy	The SC-497-class submarine chaser grounded on Cook's Reef, off Mai Island, New Hebrides, and sank the next day.
TKA-212	Soviet Navy	World War II: The A-2 (Higgins 78')-class motor torpedo boat was shelled and sunk by UJ-1219 (Kriegsmarine) in the Barents Sea during an attack on a German convoy. Two crewmen were made prisoners of war and 11 were killed.
U-515	Kriegsmarine	U-515 World War II: The Type IXC submarine was depth charged and damaged in the Atlantic Ocean by USS Chatelain, USS Flaherty, USS Pillsbury and USS Pope (all United States Navy). She surfaced, and was then bombed, shelled and sunk by the four destroyers and by Grumman TBF Avenger and Grumman F4F Wildcat aircraft based on USS Guadalcanal (United States Navy) with the loss of sixteen of her 60 crew.

== 10 April ==
List of shipwrecks: 10 April 1944
Ship	State	Description
M-459	Kriegsmarine	World War II: The minesweeper was bombed by Soviet aircraft and sunk in the Baltic Sea off Aseri, Estonia (59°30′N 27°05.09′E).
Oldham	United States	World War II: Convoy SC 156: The cargo ship suffered a broken propeller shaft and was abandoned by her 51 crew. They were rescued by Goodwin (United Kingdom). Oldham was towed to St. John's, Newfoundland.
Sperrbrecher 193 Albrecht Durer	Kriegsmarine	World War II: The river Sperrbrecher was bombed by Soviet aircraft in the Black Sea and had to be run aground north of Sulina. She was then abandoned.
U-68	Kriegsmarine	World War II: The Type IXC submarine was sunk in the Atlantic Ocean (33°24′N 18°59′W) by Grumman TBF Avenger and Grumman F4F Wildcat aircraft based on USS Guadalcanal (United States Navy) with the loss of 56 of her 57 crew.

== 11 April ==
List of shipwrecks: 11 April 1944
Ship	State	Description
AF 24	Kriegsmarine	World War II: The Type A Artilleriefährprahm was sunk at Stettin, Pomerania during an American air raid.
Akigumo	Imperial Japanese Navy	World War II: The Kagerō-class destroyer was torpedoed and sunk in the Moro Gulf 30 nautical miles (56 km) south east of Zamboanga (6°43′N 122°23′E) by USS Redfin (United States Navy). One hundred and thirty-seven people were killed, including her commanding officer.
Emily	Denmark	World War II: The cargo ship was sunk at Stettin during an American air raid.
F 300	Kriegsmarine	World War II: The Type B Marinefährprahm was sunk at Stettin during an American air raid.
F 389	Kriegsmarine	World War II: The Marinefährprahm was sunk at Stettin during an American air raid.
USS Holder	United States Navy	World War II: The Edsall-class destroyer escort was torpedoed and damaged in the Mediterranean Sea off Algiers, Algeria by Luftwaffe aircraft. Her crew lost 17 killed and 12 wounded. She was towed to Oran and then to New York, where she was condemned. A 95-foot (29 m) section of her stern was used to repair USS Menges (United States Navy).
M 6022 Enseigne	Kriegsmarine	World War II: The minesweeper was torpedoed and sunk in the Mediterranean Sea (43°22′N 07°00′E) by HMS Untiring (Royal Navy). 14 crew members were killed and 3 of the 12 survivors were wounded.
Mars	Kriegsmarine	World War II: The artillery training ship was bombed and destroyed by fire at Stettin in an American air raid.
Nino Padre	Germany	The cargo ship was sunk in an Allied air raid on Genoa, Italy.
R-27	Kriegsmarine	World War II: The Type R-25 minesweeper was sunk in the Pilava-Konigsberg Canal by mines.
R-204	Kriegsmarine	World War II: The Type R-151 minesweeper was sunk by Soviet aircraft at Feodosija, Soviet Union. Raised, repaired, and put into Soviet Navy service as BO-51.
Stör	Germany	World War II: The cargo ship was torpedoed and sunk in the Barents Sea off Kirkenes, Norway.
U-108	Kriegsmarine	World War II: The Type IXB submarine was bombed and sunk at Stettin in an American air raid. She was raised on 17 July and decommissioned. Scuttled on 24 April 1945.
U-902	Kriegsmarine	World War II: The Type VIIC submarine was sunk at Stettin during an American air raid.
UJ 2143 Aghios Trias	Kriegsmarine	The auxiliary submarine chaser was lost on this date.
Usambara	Kriegsmarine	World War II: The accommodation ship was bombed and set afire at Stettin. She was repaired and returned to service.

== 12 April ==
List of shipwrecks: 12 April 1944
Ship	State	Description
USS ATR-98	United States Navy	The rescue tugboat was sunk in a collision with the tugboat USS Abnaki (United States Navy) off The Azores (44°04′N 24°08′W). The whole crew was rescued by USS Moffett (United States Navy)
Cerere	Germany	World War II: The tanker was torpedoed and sunk in the Mediterranean Sea by HMS Untiring (Royal Navy).
Diana	Germany	World War II: The cargo ship was torpedoed and sunk in the Mediterranean Sea (43°25′N 06°51′E) south of Oneglia, Italy by HMS Untiring (Royal Navy).
I-174	Imperial Japanese Navy	World War II: The Kaidai-class submarine was depth charged and sunk in the Pacific Ocean east of Truk, South Pacific Mandate (10°05′N 152°29′E) by a Consolidated PB4Y Liberattor aircraft of United States Navy squadron VB-108. Lost with all 107 hands.
Narita Maru	Japan	World War II: The cargo ship was bombed and sunk in the Pacific Ocean off Hollandia, New Guinea by Douglas A-26 Invader, Consolidated B-24 Liberator, North American B-25 Mitchell and Martin B-26 Marauder aircraft of the United States Fifth Air Force.
USS PT-135	United States Navy	World War II: The ELCO 80'-class PT boat was scuttled after running aground north of Crater Point, New Britain (05°21′S 152°09′E). The whole crew was rescued.
StuBo 1045	Kriegsmarine	The StuBo42 type landing craft/motor launch was destroyed by fire in Braila, Rumania.
Taichu Maru	Japan	World War II: The cargo liner was torpedoed and sunk in the Pacific Ocean east of Okinawa, Japan (08°08′N 128°57′E) by USS Halibut (United States Navy).

== 13 April ==
List of shipwrecks: 13 April 1944
Ship	State	Description
F 565	Kriegsmarine	World War II: The Type C2 Marinefährprahm was sunk in the Black Sea by Soviet aircraft.
Ikazuchi	Imperial Japanese Navy	World War II: The Fubuki-class destroyer was torpedoed and sunk in the Pacific Ocean 200 nautical miles (370 km) south south east of Guam (10°13′N 143°51′E) by USS Harder (United States Navy). Lost with all hands.
Solvoll	Norway	World War II: The fishing vessel (10 GRT) was shelled and sunk in the Norwegian Sea 150 nautical miles (280 km) west of the Lofoten Islands by U-711 (Kriegsmarine). All eight people on board were taken on board U-711 as prisoners and were held by the Gestapo until the end of the war.

== 14 April ==
List of shipwrecks: 14 April 1944
Ship	State	Description
Bärenfels	Germany	World War II: The cargo ship was sunk by a mine, placed by the British mini-submarine X-24, while at the coal-dock at Bergen. 11 men were killed. The wreck was refloated in 1947 and scrapped.
Baroda	United Kingdom	One of the ships damaged in the Bombay Explosion World War II: Bombay Explosion: The cargo liner (3,172 GRT, 1911) was set afire and burnt out as a result of the explosion of Fort Stikine (United Kingdom) at Bombay, India. She was beached on Green Island. Consequently sold for scrap in December.
HMHS Chantilly	United Kingdom	World War II: Bombay Explosion: The hospital ship (9,986 GRT, 1923) was severely damaged by the explosion of Fort Stikine (United Kingdom) at Bombay. She was subsequently repaired and returned to service.
HMIS El Hind	Royal Indian Navy	World War II:Bombay Explosion: The landing ship infantry (large) (5,319 GRT, 1938) was burned out as a result of the explosion of Fort Stikine (United Kingdom) at Bombay. Refloated in 1945 and towed to Mandapam and resunk as a breakwater.
Empire Confidence	United Kingdom	World War II: Bombay Explosion: The cargo ship was damaged by the explosion of Fort Stikine (United Kingdom). She remained in service, and was sent to Australia for a cargo of grain to alleviate a local famine caused by the explosion.
Empire Indus	United Kingdom)	World War II: Bombay Explosion: The cargo ship was set afire and severely damaged by the explosion of Fort Stikine (United Kingdom). Subsequently repaired and returned to service.
Fort Crevier	United Kingdom	World War II: Bombay Explosion: The Fort ship (7,131 GRT, 1943) was severely damaged by the explosion of Fort Stikine (United Kingdom) at Bombay. She was subsequently used as a hulk until scrapped in 1948. A crewman was killed.
Fort Stikine	United Kingdom	World War II: Bombay Explosion: The Fort ship (7,142 GRT, 1942) exploded and sank at Bombay. The explosion resulted in the loss of many more ships.
Graciosa	Norway	World War II: Bombay Explosion: The cargo ship (1,173 GRT, 1917) was severely damaged by the explosion of Fort Stikine (United Kingdom) and was declared a total loss. She was sold for scrap in July 1944.
Generaal Van Der Heyden	Netherlands	World War II: Bombay Explosion: The ship (1,213 GRT, 1929) was lost as a result of the explosion of Fort Stikine (United Kingdom) at Bombay. 15 of the people aboard were killed.
Generaal Van Swiete	Netherlands	World War II: Bombay Explosion: The ship (1,300 GRT, 1928) was lost as a result of the explosion of Fort Stikine (United Kingdom) at Bombay. Two crew members were killed.
Iran	Panama	World War II: Bombay Explosion: The cargo ship was severely damaged by the explosion of Fort Stikine (United Kingdom) and was declared a total loss. The wreck was scrapped.
Jalapadna	India	World War II Bombay Explosion: The ship (3,935 GRT, 1929) was lifted by the tsunami caused by the explosion of Fort Stikine (United Kingdom) and broke in two when slammed down on a dock at Bombay. The wreck was subsequently scrapped in situ.
Kingyuan	United Kingdom	World War II: Bombay Explosion: The ship (2,653 GRT, 1921) was lost as a result of the explosion of Fort Stikine (United Kingdom) at Bombay.
HMS LCP(L) 323	Royal Navy	World War II: Bombay Explosion: The landing craft personnel (large) (6/8 t, 1943) was destroyed by the explosion of Fort Stikine (United Kingdom).
HMS LCP(R) 866	Royal Navy	World War II: Bombay Explosion: The landing craft personnel (ramp) (6/8 t, 1943) was burnt out as a result of the explosion of Fort Stikine (United Kingdom) at Bombay.
Maician	United Kingdom	World War II: The cargo ship was driven ashore at Craig Ewen Point, 2 nautical miles (3.7 km) north of Peterhead, Aberdeenshire (57°31′30″N 1°48′00″W). She was a total loss.
Norse Trader	Panama	World War II: Bombay Explosion: The cargo ship was severely damaged by the explosion of Fort Stikine (United Kingdom) and was declared a total loss.
Rod El Farag	Egypt	World War II: Bombay Explosion: The ship (6,842 GRT, 1910) was lost as a result of the explosion of Fort Stikine (United Kingdom) at Bombay. She was sunk for use as a jetty.
Tinombo	Netherlands	World War II: Bombay Explosion: The ship was burnt out as a result of the explosion of Fort Stikine (United Kingdom) at Bombay. Eight of the people aboard were killed. Declared a total loss, she was sunk for use as a jetty.
U-448	Kriegsmarine	World War II: The Type VIIC submarine was depth charged and sunk in the Atlantic Ocean north east of the Azores, Portugal (46°22′N 19°35′W) by HMS Pelican (Royal Navy) and HMCS Swansea (Royal Canadian Navy) with the loss of nine of her 51 crew.
Vesper	Kriegsmarine	World War II: The fishing cutter (93 GRT, 1891) was bombed and sunk in the Barents Sea off Makkaur, Norway by Soviet aircraft.

== 15 April ==
List of shipwrecks: 15 April 1944
Ship	State	Description
F 564	Kriegsmarine	The Type C2 Marinefährprahm was sunk on this date.
F 569	Kriegsmarine	World War II: The Type C2M minelaying Marinefährprahm was sunk in the Black Sea by Soviet aircraft.
Friedrichshafen	Germany	World War II: The cargo ship was torpedoed and sunk in the North Sea off Egersund, Norway by HMS Venturer (Royal Navy).
Hakuo Maru	Imperial Japanese Navy	The auxiliary guard boat was lost on this date.
Rapel	Chile	The cargo ship struck a rock in the Guia Narrows and was beached (58°45′S 74°25′W). She was declared a total loss.
Solveig	Kriegsmarine	World War II: The naval trawler was bombed and sunk in the Barents Sea off Makkaur, Norway by Soviet aircraft.
Sumida Maru	Japan	World War II: The cargo ship struck a mine and sank in the Pacific Ocean off Honshu.
UJ 2141	Kriegsmarine	World War II: The submarine chaser was bombed and sunk in the Mediterranean Sea by British aircraft.
W-7	Imperial Japanese Navy	World War II: The No.7-class minesweeper was torpedoed and sunk in the Indian Ocean off the Nicobar Islands (11°34′N 93°08′E) by HMS Storm (Royal Navy).

== 16 April ==
List of shipwrecks: 16 April 1944
Ship	State	Description
AF 1	Kriegsmarine	World War II: The Type A Artilleriefährprahm was bombed and sunk at Boulogne, Pas-de-Calais, France by Allied aircraft.
Dordogne	Germany	World War II: The lighter was sunk by a mine in the Black Sea.
F 402	Kriegsmarine	The Type C Marinefährprahm was sunk on this date.
Hino Maru No.1	Japan	World War II: Convoy H-22: The cargo ship was torpedoed and sunk in the Philippine Sea by USS Paddle (United States Navy). Nineteen troops and nineteen crewmen were killed.
Meyer London	United States	World War II: Convoy UGS 37: The Liberty ship was torpedoed and sunk in the Mediterranean Sea off Derna, Libya (32°38′N 23°08′E) by U-407 (Kriegsmarine) All 72 crew were rescued by HMS La Malouine (Royal Navy).
Mito Maru	Japan	World War II: Convoy H-22: The cargo ship was torpedoed and sunk in the Philippine Sea (2°02′S 127°20′E) by USS Paddle (United States Navy). A total of 280 troops, nine gunners and 29 crewmen were killed.
PiLB 379	Kriegsmarine	The PiLB 40 type landing craft was lost on this date.
Pan-Pennsylvania	United States	World War II: Convoy CU 21: The Type T3 tanker was torpedoed and damaged in the Atlantic Ocean 200 nautical miles (370 km) east of New York (40°05′N 69°40′W) by U-550 (Kriegsmarine) with the loss of ten gunners and fifteen of her 56 crew. Survivors abandoned ship and were rescued by USS Joyce and USS Peterson (both United States Navy). Some of the shells fired by USS Gandy, Joyce and Peterson (all United States Navy) in sinking U-550 hit Pan-Pennsylvania setting her on fire (40°09′N 69°44′W). Pan-Pennsylvania was scuttled by bombing and sank on 18 April at 40°24′N 69°37′W by Allied aircraft.
R-108	Kriegsmarine	World War II: The Type R-41 minesweeper was sunk in the North Sea off Terschelling, Friesland, Netherlands in a collision with R-229 (Kriegsmarine).
Shinyu Maru	Japan	World War II: The cargo liner was torpedoed and sunk in the Philippine Sea by USS Redfin (United States Navy).
Thomas G. Masaryk	United States	World War II: Convoy UGS-37: The Liberty ship was torpedoed and damaged in the Mediterranean Sea 17 nautical miles (31 km) off Derna (32°51′N 23°00′E) by U-407 (Kriegsmarine). All 70 crew abandoned ship and were rescued by HMS La Malouine (Royal Navy). Thomas G. Masaryk was taken in tow by HMS Captive (Royal Navy) and beached in Maneola Bay. She was shelled and sunk in order to extinguish the fire that had started when she was torpedoed. She was refloated on 28 August and towed by HMS Captive to Port Said, Egypt but was declared a constructive total loss.
U-550	Kriegsmarine	U-550 World War II: The IXC/40 submarine was depth charged, shelled, rammed and sunk in the Atlantic Ocean (40°09′N 69°44′W) by USS Gandy, USS Joyce and USS Peterson (all United States Navy) with the loss of 44 of her 56 crew. Survivors were taken as prisoners of war by USS Joyce.
Yamagata Maru	Imperial Japanese Army	World War II: Convoy M-27: The Akita Maru-class auxiliary transport was torpedoed and sunk in the Philippine Sea (06°51′N 123°37′E) by USS Redfin (United States Navy). 28 passengers and 5 crewmen killed.

== 17 April ==
List of shipwrecks: 17 April 1944
Ship	State	Description
Alba Julia	Romania	World War II: The cargo ship was bombed and set afire in the Black Sea by Soviet aircraft. She was a total loss.
GR 02	Kriegsmarine	World War II: The guard ship was torpedoed and sunk at Kos, Greece by Royal Navy motor torpedo boats.
GR 94	Kriegsmarine	World War II: The guard ship was torpedoed and sunk at Kos by Royal Navy motor torpedo boats.
James Guthrie	United States	World War II: The Liberty ship struck a mine and was damaged in the Mediterranean Sea off Salerno, Italy. She was beached at Naples but broke in two and was declared a constructive total loss.
M 3860	Kriegsmarine	World War II: The minesweeper struck a mine and sank in the German Bight.
Matsue Maru	Japan	World War II: The cargo ship was torpedoed and sunk in the Pacific Ocean by USS Harder (United States Navy).
Noshiro Maru No. 2	Imperial Japanese Navy	World War II: The auxiliary minesweeper was torpedoed and sunk in the Pacific Ocean by USS Searaven (United States Navy).
U-342	Kriegsmarine	World War II: The Type VIIC submarine was depth charged and sunk in the Atlantic Ocean (60°32′N 29°20′W) by a Consolidated PBY Catalina aircraft of 162 Squadron, Royal Canadian Air Force with the loss of all 51 crew.
U-986	Kriegsmarine	World War II: The Type VIIC submarine was depth charged and sunk in the Atlantic Ocean south west of Iceland (50°09′N 12°51′W) by USS PC-619 and USS Swift (both United States Navy) with the loss of all 50 crew.

== 18 April ==
List of shipwrecks: 18 April 1944
Ship	State	Description
DB-35	Soviet Navy	The No. 1-class landing boat was lost on this date.
USS Gudgeon	United States Navy	World War II: The Tambor-class submarine was bombed and sunk in the Pacific Ocean off Iwo Jima (22°52′N 143°32′E) by a Mitsubishi G3M "Nell" bomber aircraft of the 901 Air Group, Imperial Japanese Navy.
Koga Maru	Imperial Japanese Navy	World War II: The Choko Maru-class auxiliary transport (909 GRT, 1941) struck a naval mine and flooded at Penang. The vessel was refloated 40 days later.
L-6	Soviet Navy	World War II: The Leninets-class submarine was sunk in the Black Sea east of Constanta, Romania (43°28′N 31°32′E) by UJ-104 (Kriegsmarine).
Ya-26	Soviet Navy	The Ya-5-class mortar motor boat was lost on this date.
Ya-27	Soviet Navy	The Ya-5-class mortar motor boat was lost on this date.

== 19 April ==
List of shipwrecks: 19 April 1944
Ship	State	Description
Embla	Sweden	Red Cross: World War II: The Red Cross-marked cargo ship was bombed and sunk in the Mediterranean Sea off Sète, Hérault, France by Bristol Beaufighter aircraft of Royal Air Force. All 21 crew survived the attack.
F 622	Kriegsmarine	World War II: The Type C2 Marinefährprahm was sunk by Allied fighter-bomber aircraft off Piombino, Italy.
F 4760	Kriegsmarine	World War II: The MZ-A landing craft was sunk by Allied fighter-bomber aircraft off Piombino, Italy. One crew was killed.
Haruno Maru	Japan	World War II: Operation Cockpit: The transport was sunk at Sabang, Sumatra, Netherlands East Indies by aircraft from HMS Illustrious (Royal Navy) and USS Saratoga (United States Navy). A crewman was killed.
John Straub	United States	World War II: During a voyage from Port Townsend, Washington, to Dutch Harbor, Territory of Alaska, with a cargo of highly flammable cargo of fuel, the Liberty ship, operating as a cargo ship for the United States Army was torpedoed by I-180 (Imperial Japanese Navy) and broke in two in the Pacific Ocean at 54°22′N 163°24′W, approximately 20 nautical miles (37 km; 23 mi) southeast of Sanak Island in the Fox Islands subgroup of the Aleutian Islands. The bow section sank. The stern section was scuttled by the patrol frigate USS Albuquerque (United States Navy). A passenger, 14 embarked personnel of the United States Navy Armed Guard, and 40 crewmen were killed. Her 15 survivors were rescued by the cargo ship FP 41 (United States Army).
José Illucea	Spain	World War II: The coaster was bombed and sunk in the Gulf of Lyon by Bristol Beaufighter aircraft of Royal Air Force. Two crew were killed.
Kampung Besar	Japan	World War II: The tug was torpedoed and sunk in the Strait of Malacca by HMS Tantalus (Royal Navy).
Kunitsu Maru	Imperial Japanese Navy	World War II: Operation Cockpit: The Kamitsu-class transport was sunk at Sabang, Sumatra, Netherlands East Indies by aircraft from HMS Illustrious (Royal Navy) and USS Saratoga (United States Navy). The ship was refloated on 2 January 1945 and towed to Singapore.
RTShch-37	Soviet Navy	World War II: The K-15/M-17-class river minesweeping launch was sunk by a mine in the Black Sea. The crew was saved.
Tärnan	Sweden	World War II: The cargo ship struck a mine and sank off Warnemünde, Germany. Two crew were killed.
U-974	Kriegsmarine	World War II: The Type VIIC submarine was torpedoed and sunk in the North Sea off Karmsund, Norway (59°08′N 5°23′E) by Ula (Royal Norwegian Navy) with the loss of 42 of her 50 crew.
V 1233 Vooruit	Kriegsmarine	World War II: The Vorpostenboot was sunk in the North Sea by British aircraft.
V 1236 Augusta	Kriegsmarine	World War II: The Vorpostenboot was sunk in the North Sea by British aircraft.
V 1237 Notre Dame de Dunes	Kriegsmarine	World War II: The Vorpostenboot was sunk in the North Sea by British aircraft.

== 20 April ==
List of shipwrecks: 20 April 1944
Ship	State	Description
El Biar	Free France	World War II: Convoy CAF 31: The passenger/cargo ship was torpedoed and sunk in the Mediterranean Sea off Algeria by aircraft of the Luftwaffe. One gunner was killed.
Krosdøl	Norway	Bergen explosion: The coaster (177 GRT, 1918) was sunk at Bergen, Norway, by the explosion of Voorbode (Kriegsmarine). One killed.
USS Lansdale	United States Navy	World War II: Convoy UGS 38: The Benson-class destroyer was torpedoed and sunk in the Mediterranean Sea off Algiers, Algeria by Junkers Ju 88 aircraft of III Staffeln Kampfgeschwader 26 and Heinkel He 111 aircraft of I & II Staffeln, Kampfgeschwader 77, Luftwaffe with the loss of 47 of her 279 crew. Survivors were rescued by USS Menges and USS Newell (both United States Navy).
Musca	Norway	Bergen explosion: The vessel was lifted onto the pier at Bergen by the wave created by the explosion of Voorbode (Kriegsmarine). Her captain was killed. The vessel was refloated and towed to Leirvik, Stord for repairs.
No. 42	Soviet Navy	The No. 11-class landing tender was lost on this date.
Paul Hamilton	United States	Paul Hamilton exploding World War II: Convoy UGS 38: The Liberty ship was torpedoed, blew up and sank in the Mediterranean Sea off Algiers (37°00′N 3°20′E) by aircraft of III Staffeln, Kampfgeschwader 26 and I & II Staffeln, Kampfgeschwader 77, Luftwaffe. All 504 troops, 29 gunners and 47 crewmen aboard were killed.
Royal Star	United Kingdom	World War II: Convoy UGS 38: The cargo ship (7,900 GRT, 1919) was torpedoed and sunk in the Mediterranean Sea northeast of Algiers, Algeria (37°02′N 3°41′E) by aircraft of the Luftwaffe with the loss of one of her 79 crew.
Schute	Netherlands	Bergen explosion: The vessel was lifted onto the pier at Bergen by the wave created by the explosion of Voorbode (Kriegsmarine).
Sperrbrecher 102 Condor	Kriegsmarine	World War II: The Sperrbrecher was torpedoed and sunk in the North Sea off Schiermonnikoog, Friesland, Netherlands, by Allied aircraft.
UIT-5	Kriegsmarine	World War II: The submarine was sunk at Monfalcone, Friuli-Venezia Giulia, Italy, in an Allied air raid.
UJ 203	Kriegsmarine	World War II: The submarine chaser, a former Gabbiano-class corvette, was sunk at Monfalcone by Allied aircraft. She was further attacked and destroyed on 19 July 1944.
Voorbode	Kriegsmarine	Bergen explosion: The trawler/cargo ship, transporting explosives, blew up and sank at Bergen by an accidental explosion. One hundred and fifty-eight people were killed. About 4,800 were wounded.

== 21 April ==
List of shipwrecks: 21 April 1944
Ship	State	Description
M 553	Kriegsmarine	World War II: The torpedo recovery vessel, a former Jan van Amstel-class minesweeper, struck a mine and sank in the Baltic Sea off the coast of East Prussia. The wreck was raised 20 July 1944 and towed to Gotenhafen for decommissioning. Afterwards, the wreck was towed to Stettin where it was set ablaze by bombs on 30 August 1944 near the Gollnowwerft.
Munsterland	Germany	World War II: The cargo ship ran aground off Cap Gris Nez, Pas-de-Calais, France. She was shelled by British shore-based artillery and was a total loss.
NB-7 Enare-II	Yugoslav Partisans	World War II: The gunboat was damaged in a collision with NB-8 Kornat ( Yugoslav Partisans) and was scuttled to prevent capture in the area of Mljet and Korčula.
P A F #27	United States	The 70-gross register ton, 65-foot (19.8 m) scow sank in the Gulf of Alaska approximately 120 nautical miles (220 km; 140 mi) off Cape Spencer on the coast of the Territory of Alaska.
Roland	Kriegsmarine	World War II: The auxiliary minelayer struck a mine and sank in the Gulf of Finland, west of the Kurgalsky Peninsula (59°43.2′N 27°28.2′E).

== 22 April ==
List of shipwrecks: 22 April 1944
Ship	State	Description
Bahia	Germany	World War II: The cargo ship was torpedoed and sunk in the North Sea off Lista, Norway (58°07′N 6°27′E) by Ula (Royal Norwegian Navy).
Erling Brøvig	Norway	World War II: Convoy PA 69: The tanker was torpedoed and severely damaged by U-510 (Kriegsmarine). She was towed in to Massowah, Eritrea and laid up. Repaired in 1946 and returned to service as Bramora.
Hokuan I-Go	Japan	World War II: The salvage vessel was torpedoed and sunk in the Strait of Malacca by HMS Taurus (Royal Navy).
Jylland	Germany	World War II: The coaster (539 GRT, 1887) struck a mine and sank in the Baltic Sea off Stralsund, Mecklenburg-Vorpommern.
Kainan Maru No. 15	Japan	World War II: The tug was torpedoed and sunk in the Strait of Malacca by HMS Taurus (Royal Navy).
Koryu Maru	Imperial Japanese Navy	World War II: Convoy SHISA-17: The Kumagawa Maru-class auxiliary collier/oiler (6,680 GRT, 1931) was bombed and sunk in the South China Sea 2 nautical miles (3.7 km) north east of Cape St. Jacques Lighthouse, French Indochina (10°19′N 107°05′E), by Consolidated B-24 Liberator aircraft of the 308th Bomb Group, United States Fourteenth Air Force. Thirty-eight troops and 43 crewmen were killed.
London Maru	Imperial Japanese Army	World War II: Convoy SHISA-17: The London Maru-class transport was bombed and sunk in the South China Sea two nautical miles (3.7 km; 2.3 mi) north east of Cape St. Jacques Lighthouse, French Indochina (10°19′N 107°05′E), by Consolidated B-24 Liberator aircraft of the 308th Bomb Group, United States Fourteenth Air Force. Two crewmen were killed.
Nagata Maru	Imperial Japanese Navy	World War II: Convoy SHISA-17: The Ikuta Maru-class transport (2,969 GRT, 1937) was bombed and sunk in the South China Sea 2 nautical miles (3.7 km) north east of Cape St. Jacques Lighthouse, French Indochina, by Consolidated B-24 Liberator aircraft of the 308th Bomb Group, United States Fourteenth Air Force. Nineteen troops, 27 other passengers, and seven crewmen were killed.
Pavlin Vinogradov	Soviet Union	World War II: During a voyage with a cargo of acetone from Portland, Oregon, to Vladivostok in the Soviet Union via Akutan in the Aleutian Islands, the 2,864-gross register ton cargo liner was sunk by an unidentified submarine – almost certainly I-180 (Imperial Japanese Navy) – in the North Pacific Ocean approximately 250 nautical miles (460 km; 290 mi) southeast of Dutch Harbor, Territory of Alaska. She exploded and sank in less than a minute, with 13 crewmen killed. The other 29 crewmen abandoned ship in a lifeboat, but only nine of them remained alive when the steamer Ola (Soviet Union) rescued them six days later. Pavlin Vinogradov's master did not survive.
Roland	Kriegsmarine	World War II: The auxiliary minelayer struck a mine and sank in the Baltic Sea.
Shonan Maru No. 7	Imperial Japanese Navy	World War II: The submarine chaser was torpedoed and sunk in the Strait of Malacca by HMS Sea Rover (Royal Navy).
U-311	Kriegsmarine	World War II: The Type VIIC submarine was depth charged and sunk in the Atlantic Ocean south west of Iceland (52°09′N 19°07′W) by HMCS Matane and HMCS Swansea (both Royal Canadian Navy) with the loss of all 51 crew.
Yamamizu Maru No. 3	Imperial Japanese Navy	World War II: Convoy SHISA-17: The tanker was bombed and sunk in the South China Sea 2 nautical miles (3.7 km) north east of Cape St. Jacques Lighthouse, French Indochina, by Consolidated B-24 Liberator aircraft of the 308th Bomb Group, United States Fourteenth Air Force. Eighteen crewmen were killed.

== 23 April ==
List of shipwrecks: 23 April 1944
Ship	State	Description
Amagiri	Imperial Japanese Navy	World War II: The Fubuki-class destroyer was sunk in the Makassar Strait 50 nautical miles (93 km) south of Balikpapan Borneo by a mine. Thirteen crewmen were killed. Survivors were rescued by the heavy cruiser Aoba and the light cruiser Ōi (both Imperial Japanese Navy).
Daiju Maru	Japan	World War II: The cargo ship was torpedoed and sunk in the Seto Inland Sea by the submarine USS Seadragon (United States Navy).
S 54	Kriegsmarine	World War II: The E-boat was badly damaged by a mine off Lefkada Island, Greece. Three crew were killed and five wounded. SHe was subsequently decommissioned on 31 October 1944 and scrapped.
V 6109 Nordwind	Kriegsmarine	World War II: The Seeteufel-class naval whaler/Vorpostenboot was torpedoed and damaged by Soviet aircraft. She was taken under tow, but later that day was bombed and sunk off Vardo by Soviet aircraft. 17 of her 54 crew were killed.

== 24 April ==
List of shipwrecks: 24 April 1944
Ship	State	Description
Barmbek	Germany	The cargo ship broke in two in the Atlantic Ocean (62°00′25″N 5°10′01″E). the bow section sank. The stern section was beached at Måløy, Norway. It was refloated in 1949 and towed to Flensburg, West Germany. A new bow section was constructed and she returned to service as Kate Grammerstorf.
H. H. Conway	United States	The trawler sank south of Marathon Key, Florida at 24°40′N 81°04′W.
HMS LST-407	Royal Navy	The Mk 2 landing ship tank (1,625/4,080 t, 1942) was run aground off Naples, Italy and was not repaired. Returned to the United States Navy in May 1945.
HMS MTB 671	Royal Navy	World War II: The Fairmile D motor torpedo boat (102/118 t, 1943) was shelled and sunk in the English Channel off Cape Barfleur, France by Kriegsmarine destroyers.
HMS Roode Zee	Royal Navy	World War II: The rescue tug (468 GRT, 1938) was torpedoed and sunk in the English Channel off Dungeness, Kent, United Kingdom by S 100 (Kriegsmarine).

== 25 April ==
List of shipwrecks: 25 April 1944
Ship	State	Description
F 350	Kriegsmarine	World War II: The Type A Marinefährprahm (155 GRT) was sunk off Elba by gunfire of LCG 14 19 and 20 (Royal Navy). 17 crew members were killed.
F 423	Kriegsmarine	World War II: The Type C Marinefährprahm (155 GRT) was sunk off San Vincenzo, Tuscany by a mixed formation of US Navy and Royal Navy coastal force ships. 11 crewmen were killed.
F 515	Kriegsmarine	World War II: The Type C Marinefährprahm (155 GRT) was sunk off San Vincenzo, Tuscany by a mixed formation of US Navy and Royal Navy coastal force ships. 5 crewmen were killed.
F 610	Kriegsmarine	World War II: The Type C2 Marinefährprahm (155 GRT) was sunk off Elba by gunfire of LCG 14 19 and 20 (Royal Navy). 17 crew members were killed.
F 621	Kriegsmarine	World War II: The Type C2 Marinefährprahm (155 GRT) was sunk off San Vincenzo, Tuscany by a mixed formation of US Navy and Royal Navy coastal force ships. 12 crewmen were killed.
No. 41	Soviet Navy	The No. 11-class landing tender was lost on this date.
O 22 S	Kriegsmarine	World War II: The tug was sunk in an Allied air raid on Kiel, Schleswig-Holstein. She was subsequently salvaged, repaired and returned to service.
T27	Kriegsmarine	World War II: The torpedo boat was shelled and damaged in the English Channel in a battle with HMS Ashanti, HMS Black Prince (both Royal Navy), HMCS Haida and HMCS Huron (both Royal Canadian Navy). She was beached at Morlaix, Manche, France on 27 April. T 27 was further damaged in an air attack on 3 May and was torpedoed and sunk by HMMTB 673 on 7 May.
T29	Kriegsmarine	World War II: The torpedo boat was shelled and sunk in the English Channel by HMCS Haida (Royal Canadian Navy) with the loss of 62 of her 135 crew. Survivors were rescued by Kriegsmarine Vorpostenboote.
TA23	Kriegsmarine	World War II: The Ciclone-class torpedo boat was damaged by a mine off Capraia, Italy (43°02′N 10°12′E). Scuttled by TA29 (Kriegsmarine) when attacked by Royal Navy motor torpedo boats.
Tetsuyo Maru	Japan	World War II: The cargo ship was torpedoed and sunk in the Pacific Ocean north west of Chichi-jima by USS Guavina (United States Navy).
UJ 206	Kriegsmarine	World War II: The submarine chaser, a former Gabbiano-class corvette, was scuttled at Venice, Italy after being damaged by Allied aircraft. Raised, repaired and returned to Italian service post-War.

== 26 April ==
List of shipwrecks: 26 April 1944
Ship	State	Description
Colin	Panama	World War II: Convoy SC 157: The cargo ship straggled behind the convoy due to steering gear defects. She was torpedoed and sunk in the Atlantic Ocean (54°16′N 31°58′W) by U-859 (Kriegsmarine) with the loss of one of her 55 crew. Survivors were rescued by HMS Affleck and HMS Bentley (both Royal Navy).
Eugenio C.	Germany	World War II: The cargo ship was bombed and sunk by Fleet Air Arm aircraft south of Bodø, Norway. 17 Italian sailors, five German sailors, ten German Flak gunners and the Norwegian pilot were killed. There were 12 survivors.
I-180	Imperial Japanese Navy	World War II: The Kaidai-class submarine was depth charged, hedgehogged and sunk in the Pacific Ocean south west of Chirikof Island (55°09′57″N 155°40′00″W) by USS Gilmore (United States Navy) with the loss of all 86 crew.
Itauri	Germany	World War II: The cargo ship was bombed and sunk by aircraft south of Bodø, Norway.
Jäämeri	Finland	World War II: The cargo ship struck a mine and sank in the Baltic Sea off Darß, Mecklenburg-Vorpommern, Germany.
James H. Reed	United States	The lake freighter sank in a collision with the steamer Ashcroft in Lake Erie 42 miles (67.6 km) west of Long Point, with the loss of 12 of her 36 crew.
Kashiwa Maru	Japan	World War II: The cargo ship was torpedoed and sunk in the Pacific Ocean north of Borneo by USS Crevalle (United States Navy).
KT 3	Kriegsmarine	World War II: The Marinefährprahm was sunk in the North Sea west of Fugloy, Faroe Islands by British aircraft. She was later salvaged and repaired.
Lasbek	Germany	World War II: The cargo ship was torpedoed and sunk at Borkum, or Bergen, Norway, by British carrier-based aircraft.
Lotte Leonhardt	Germany	World War II: The cargo ship was bombed and sunk by Allied aircraft off Fuglo, south of Bodø, Norway.
Miike Maru	Imperial Japanese Army	World War II: Convoy Higashi Matsu No. 5: The Miike Maru-class auxiliary transport was torpedoed and damaged in the Pacific Ocean off Palau by USS Trigger (United States Navy). She caught fire from a fuel leak, was abandoned and sank two days later. Nine passengers, seven gunners and two crew were killed. Survivors were rescued by Manju (Imperial Japanese Navy).
Noshiro Maru No. 1-Go	Japan	World War II: The cargo ship was torpedoed and sunk in the Pacific Ocean north west of Chichi-Jima by USS Guavina (United States Navy).
S 147	Kriegsmarine	World War II: The Schnellboot was sunk by La Combattante (Free French Naval Forces) south of Beachy Head. 13 crew were killed.
Tokiwa Maru	Japan	World War II: The cargo ship was torpedoed and sunk in the Pacific Ocean by USS Bonefish (United States Navy).
U-488	Kriegsmarine	World War II: The Type XIV submarine was depth charged and sunk in the Atlantic Ocean west of the Cape Verde Islands, Portugal (17°54′N 38°05′W) by USS Barber, USS Frost, USS Huse and USS Snowden (all United States Navy) with the loss of all 64 crew.
V 606 Fladengrund	Kriegsmarine	World War II: The Vorpostenboot was sunk in the Bay of Biscay south of Belle Île, Finistère, France in an Allied air raid.
V 1401 Deister	Kriegsmarine	The Vorpostenboot suffered a boiler explosion and sank in the North Sea off IJmuiden, North Holland, Netherlands.
Wazan Maru	Imperial Japanese Navy	World War II: The transport ship was torpedoed and sunk in the Kii Channel (33°30′N 135°27′E) by USS Sargo (United States Navy).
Yoshida Maru No.1	Imperial Japanese Army	World War II: Take Ichi convoy: The transport was torpedoed and sunk in the South China Sea (18°06′N 119°40′E) by USS Jack (United States Navy). 2,586 troops, 2 passengers, and 63 crewmen killed. 860 troops survived, or took down an entire 3,189-man Imperial Japanese Army regiment including its commander.

== 27 April ==
List of shipwrecks: 27 April 1944
Ship	State	Description
Akigawa Maru	Japan	World War II: The Standard Merchant Type 1K ore carrier (a.k.a. Akikawa Maru) was torpedoed and sunk in the Pacific Ocean 150 nautical miles (280 km) west of Saipan (14°46′N 143°22′E) by the submarine USS Seahorse (United States Navy). Two troops and an unknown number of other passengers and crew were killed.
Axel	Germany	World War II: The cargo ship was bombed and sunk by aircraft at the Deutsche Werke yard in Kiel, Germany.
Daisun	Japan	World War II: The trawler was shelled and sunk in the South China Sea by the submarine USS Jack (United States Navy).
USS Etamin	United States Navy	World War II: The Crater-class cargo ship was torpedoed and damaged in Milne Bay, New Guinea, by Japanese aircraft. She consequently became a storage hulk.
Genbu Maru	Japan	World War II: Convoy OKI-509: The cargo ship was torpedoed and sunk in the Pacific Ocean (27°16′N 128°21′E) by the submarine USS Halibut (United States Navy). Two troops and a crewman were killed.
Kamome	Imperial Japanese Navy	World War II: Convoy OKI-509: The Tsubame-class minelayer was torpedoed and sunk in the Pacific Ocean (27°03′N 128°06′E) by the submarine USS Halibut (United States Navy).
M 3668	Kriegsmarine	World War II: The minesweeper, a KFK-class naval drifter, struck a mine and sank in the North Sea off Ostend, West Flanders, Belgium.
TK-332	Soviet Navy	World War II: The G-5-class motor torpedo boat was shelled and sunk by German and Romanian surface ships in the Black Sea.
U-803	Kriegsmarine	World War II: The Type IXC/40 submarine struck a mine and sank in the Baltic Sea off Swinemünde, Pomerania, with the loss of nine of her 44 crew. Salvaged in August 1944 and cannibalized for parts.
UJ 104	Kriegsmarine	World War II: The auxiliary submarine chaser was torpedoed by TK-344 (Soviet Navy) in the Black Sea, losing her stern. 17 crew were killed. She was towed to Sebastopol and was scuttled there on 10 May.
UJ 6075 Clairvoyant	Kriegsmarine	World War II: The submarine chaser was torpedoed and sunk in the Mediterranean Sea (43°01′N 05°58′E) off Toulon, Var, France, by HMS Untiring (Royal Navy). 20 crew members were killed or missing. There were 13 wounded and 49 survivors.
Yūbari	Imperial Japanese Navy	World War II: The Yūbari-class light cruiser was torpedoed and damaged in the Pacific Ocean off Sonsorol Island, southwest of Palau at (5°20′N 132°16′E), by the submarine USS Bluegill (United States Navy). She sank the next day. Nineteen crewmen were killed. Survivors were rescued by the destroyer Yūzuki (Imperial Japanese Navy).

== 28 April ==
List of shipwrecks: 28 April 1944
Ship	State	Description
Helgoland	Kriegsmarine	World War II: The rescue ship struck a mine and sank in the North Sea off Gedser, Denmark.
USS LST-507	United States Navy	World War II: Convoy T-4: Battle of Lyme Bay: The landing ship tank was torpedoed and sunk in Lyme Bay (50°28′N 02°51′W) by S 100, S 130, S 136, S 138. S 140, S 142, S 143. S 145 and S 150 (all Kriegsmarine).
USS LST-531	United States Navy	World War II: Convoy T-4: Battle of Lyme Bay: The landing ship tank was torpedoed and sunk in Lyme Bay (50°28′N 02°51′W) by S 100, S 130, S 136, S 138. S 140, S 142, S 143. S 145 and S 150 (all Kriegsmarine).
Lüneberg	Germany	World War II: The cargo ship was torpedoed and sunk in the Aegean Sea off Heraklion, Greece (39°26′N 25°07′E) by HMS Sportsman (Royal Navy).

== 29 April ==
List of shipwrecks: 29 April 1944
Ship	State	Description
HMCS Athabaskan	Royal Canadian Navy	World War II: The Tribal-class destroyer (1,927/2,675 t, 1943) was torpedoed and sunk in the English Channel off Saint-Brieuc, Côtes-du-Nord, France by T24 (Kriegsmarine) with the loss of 124 of her 219 crew.
I-183	Imperial Japanese Navy	World War II: The Kaidai-class submarine was torpedoed and sunk in the Pacific Ocean 30 nautical miles (56 km) south of Cape Ashizuri, Japan (32°07′N 133°03′E) by USS Pogy (United States Navy).
Maria	United States	The vessel sank south of Marathon Key, Florida at 24°41′N 81°05′W.
USS PT-346	United States Navy	World War II: The ELCO 80'-class PT boat was accidentally sunk in the Bismarck Sea off Cape Lambert, New Britain Island (04°13′S 151°27′E) by Vought F4U Corsair, Grumman F6F Hellcat, Douglas SBD Dauntless, and Grumman TBF Avenger aircraft of the United States Navy. Nine crew were killed. Survivors were rescued by Consolidated PBY Catalina aircraft of the United States Navy.
USS PT-347	United States Navy	World War II: The ELCO 80'-class PT boat was sunk in the Bismarck Sea off Cape Lambert, New Britain Island (04°13′S 151°27′E) by Vought F4U Corsair, Grumman F6F Hellcat, Douglas SBD Dauntless and Grumman TBF Avenger aircraft of the United States Navy. Survivors were rescued by Consolidated PBY Catalina aircraft of the United States Navy.
Pulo Salanama	Japan	World War II: The coaster was shelled and sunk in the Malacca Strait (03°19′N 99°44′E) by HMS Tantalus (Royal Navy).
Sirène	Kriegsmarine	World War II: The hulk of the decommissioned Sirène-class submarine was sunk by U.S. bombers at La Seyne-sur-Mer, France.
Song Giang Go	France	World War II: The cargo ship was torpedoed and sunk in the South China Sea off Cape Varella, French Indochina by USS Flasher (United States Navy).
T-27	Kriegsmarine	World War II: The Elbing-class torpedo boat was sunk with gunfire at Brignogan-Plages, Finistère, France.
Tahure	(France) Vichy French Navy	World War II: The Arras-class aviso was torpedoed and sunk in the South China Sea off the Hon Doi Islands, Cape Varella, French Indochina (13°02′N 109°28′E) by USS Flasher (United States Navy).
Takegawa Maru	Imperial Japanese Army	World War II: Convoy TAMA-17: The Takegawa Maru-class auxiliary transport ship was torpedoed and sunk in the South China Sea west of the Luzon Strait (19°20′N 118°50′E) by USS Bang (United States Navy). Seven crewmen were killed. Lost with the ship are 17 Daihatsu landing barges and two lighters.
U-421	Kriegsmarine	World War II: The Type VIIC submarine was bombed and sunk at Toulon, Var France during an American air raid.

== 30 April ==
List of shipwrecks: 30 April 1944
Ship	State	Description
CHa-38	Imperial Japanese Navy	World War II: The CHa-1-class auxiliary submarine chaser was sunk at Truk by American aircraft.
Hino Maru No. 2	Imperial Japanese Navy	World War II: The Hino Maru No. 2-class auxiliary transport was bombed and heavily damaged at Truk by aircraft from USS Cabot (United States Navy), sinking on 4 May at 07°18′N 151°53′E.
Minsei Maru	Imperial Japanese Navy	World War II: The Minsei Maru-class auxiliary minelayer was bombed and sunk at Truk by US Navy aircraft.
Nittatsu Maru	Japan	World War II: Convoy TAMA-17: The tanker ship was torpedoed and sunk in the Pacific Ocean (19°22′N 118°45′E) by USS Bang (United States Navy). Four crewmen were killed.
Pionier	Germany	World War II: The passenger ship struck a mine off Rixhöft and was damaged. She put in to Kiel. Repaired post-war and returned to her Dutch owners, re-entering service in September 1945 as Oranjefontein.
Ro-45	Imperial Japanese Navy	World War II: The Kaichū type submarine was depth charged and sunk in the Pacific Ocean 40 nautical miles (74 km) south of Truk (06°13′N 151°19′E) by USS Macdonough and USS Stephen Potter (both United States Navy). She was lost with all 74 crew.
VIC 42	United Kingdom	The VIC-type lighter ran aground 4 nautical miles (7.4 km) from Great Yarmouth, Norfolk. She was refloated and resumed her voyage.
William S. Thayer	United States	World War II: Convoy RA 59: The Liberty ship was torpedoed and sunk in the Barents Sea off Bear Island, Norway by U-307 (Kriegsmarine) with the loss of 43 of the 234 people on board. Survivors were rescued by Robert Eden (United States) and HMS Whitehall (Royal Navy), which scuttled the still-floating stern section of the ship.

== Unknown date ==
List of shipwrecks: Unknown date 1944
Ship	State	Description
F 394	Kriegsmarine	World War II: The Type C Marinefährprahm was sunk in the Black Sea by Soviet aircraft between 8 and 16 April.
F 395	Kriegsmarine	World War II: The Type C Marinefährprahm was sunk in the Black Sea by Soviet aircraft between 8 and 16 April.
F 608	Kriegsmarine	The Type C2 Marinefährprahm was sunk sometime in April.
HMS LCM 1313, HMS LCM 1314, HMS LCM 1373 and HMS LCM 1378	Royal Navy	The landing craft mechanized were lost in transit from the United States to India sometime in April.
HMS LCP(R) 738	Royal Navy	World War II: The landing craft personnel (ramped) was lost during an exercise at Mandapam, India.
Shinko Maru No.1 Go	Imperial Japanese Navy	The auxiliary gunboat was lost sometime in April.
U-193	Kriegsmarine	The Type IXC/40 submarine was sunk in the Bay of Biscay on or after 23 April with the loss of all 59 crew. Cause unknown.
U-355	Kriegsmarine	The Type VIIC submarine disappeared in the Barents Sea between 1 and 4 April with the loss of all 52 crew. Cause unknown.
