= K221 =

K221 or K-221 may refer to:

- K-221 (Kansas highway), a former state highway in Kansas
- HMS Chelmer (K221), a former UK Royal Navy ship
