= 1944 Bergen explosion =

Disaster in Bergen, Norway

Coordinates: 60°23′58″N 5°18′59″E

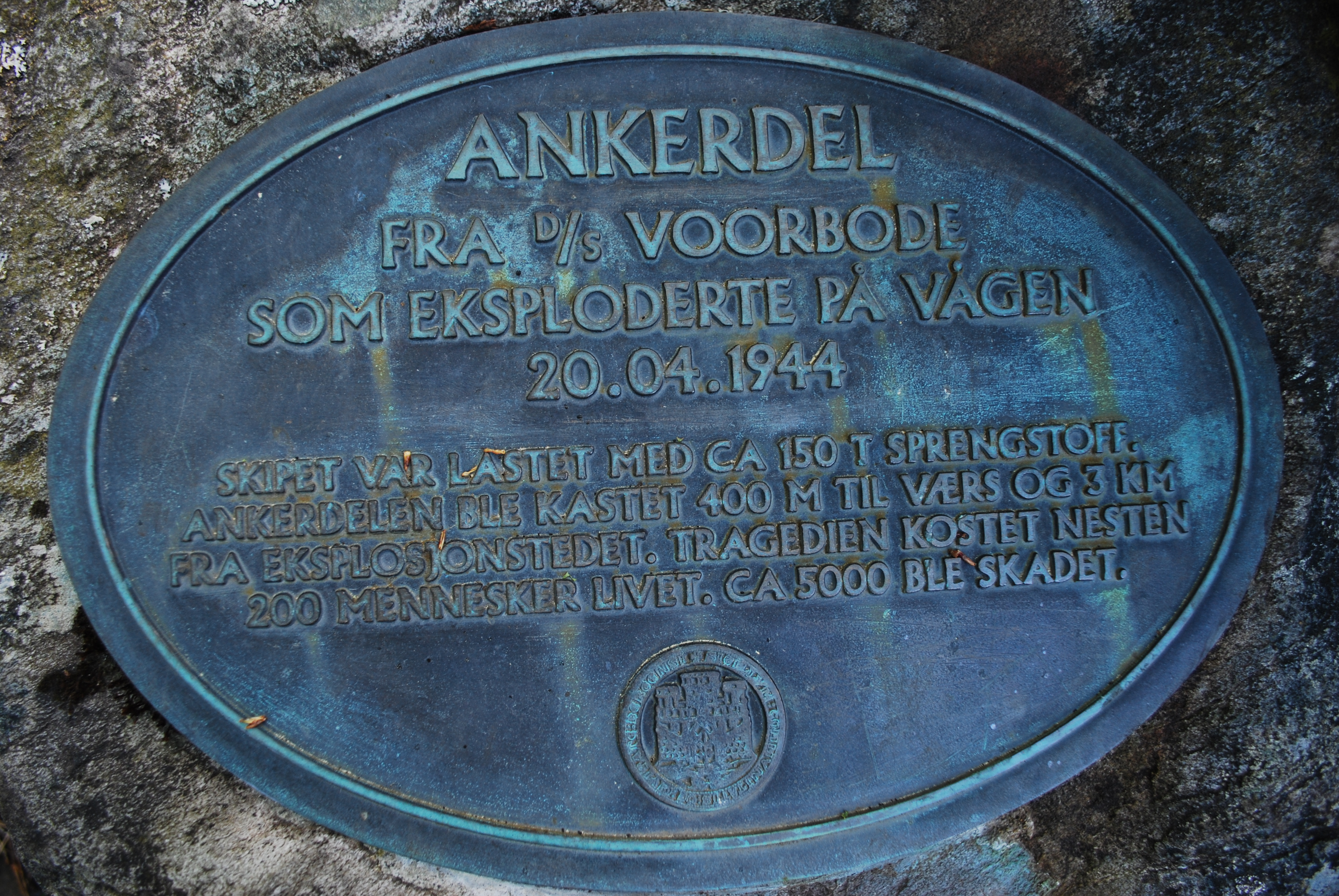
Memorial by Ankerhytten Fjeldly on the mountain Sandviksfjellet This marks where a piece of the anchor belonging to Voorbode landed, 3 km from the explosion area.

An explosion occurred in Bergen, Norway on 20 April 1944.

== History ==
The Dutch vessel ST Voorbode loaded with 273,000 lb of explosives caught fire and exploded by the quay in the center of Bergen Vågen at 08:39. 158 people (including 98 civilians) were killed and some 4,800 wounded. 131 houses were destroyed outright, while 117 were so damaged that they had to be condemned.

== Evacuation ==
Following the explosion 4,260 children were evacuated. Important cultural buildings, including Nykirken, the Customs House, Bryggen, the Rosenkrantz Tower and the Haakon's Hall, were severely damaged, but have later been restored.

== Photos ==
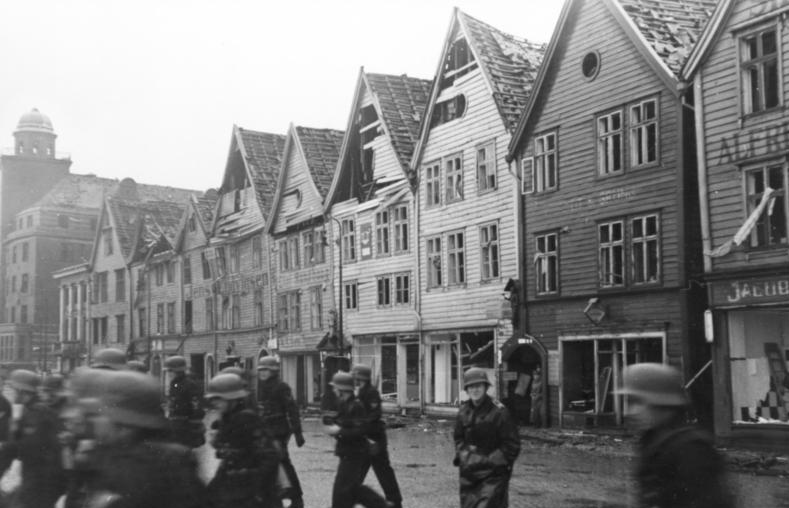
Bryggen after the explosion

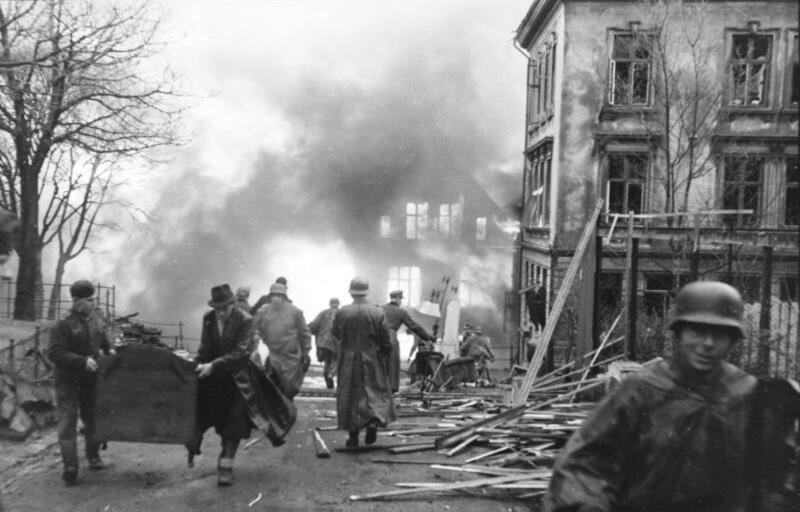
Burning and damaged houses after explosion in Vågen, Bergen on 20 April 1944

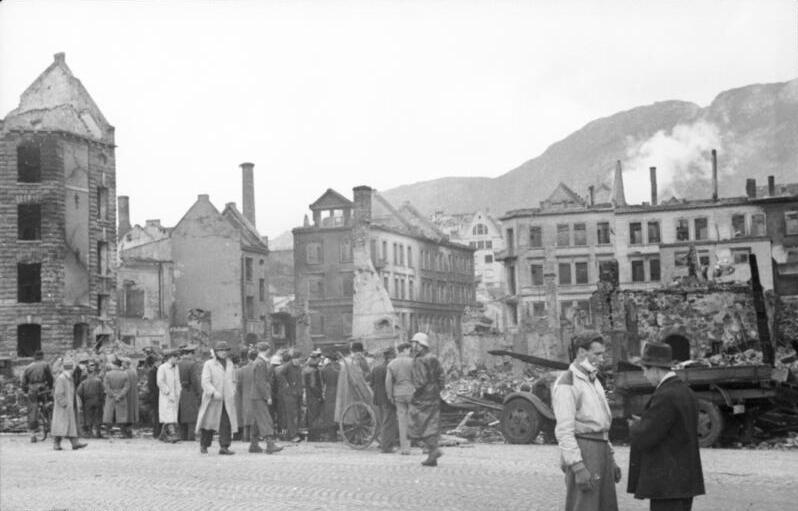
Ruined houses in the center of Bergen

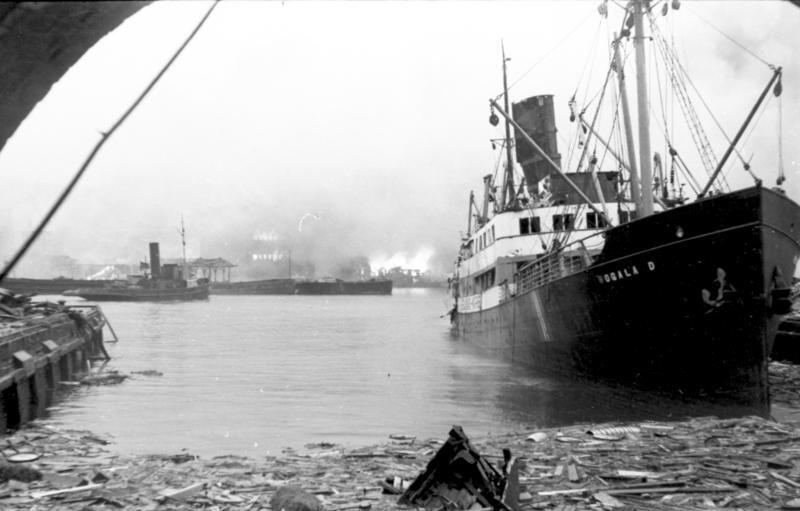
Stavangerskes coaster SS Rogaland sinking by the quay in Dreggen

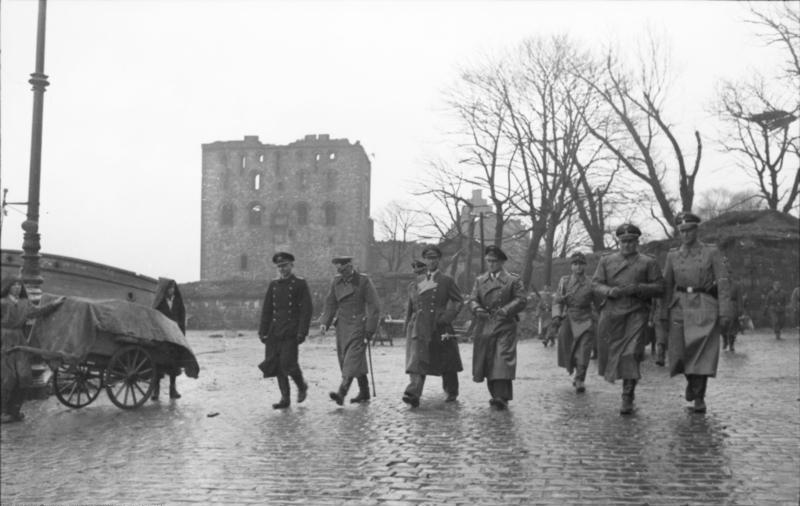
German officers from Kriegsmarine, Heer and on inspection after the accident. Among them Reichskommissar für Norwegen Josef Terboven and Admiral Otto von Schrader. In the background Rosenkrantz Tower and Haakon's Hall
