= HM LST-407 =

LST-1-class tank landing ship

History

United Kingdom
- Name: LST-407
- Ordered: as a Type S3-M-K2 hull, MCE hull 927
- Builder: Bethlehem-Fairfield Shipyard, Baltimore, Maryland
- Yard number: 2179
- Laid down: 2 September 1942
- Launched: 5 November 1942
- Commissioned: 31 December 1942
- Identification: Hull symbol: LST-407
- Fate: Returned to USN custody, 6 May 1945

United States
- Name: LST-407
- Acquired: 6 May 1945
- Stricken: 11 July 1945
- Fate: Sold for scrapping, July 1945

General characteristics
- Class & type: LST-1-class tank landing ship
- Displacement: 4,080 long tons (4,145 t) full load; 2,160 long tons (2,190 t) landing
- Length: 328 ft (100 m) oa
- Beam: 50 ft (15 m)
- Draft: Full load: 8 ft 2 in (2.49 m) forward; 14 ft 1 in (4.29 m) aft; Landing at 2,160 t: 3 ft 11 in (1.19 m) forward; 9 ft 10 in (3.00 m) aft
- Installed power: 2 × 900 hp (670 kW) Electro-Motive Diesel 12-567A diesel engines; 1,700 shp (1,300 kW)
- Propulsion: 1 × Falk main reduction gears; 2 × Propellers
- Speed: 12 kn (22 km/h; 14 mph)
- Range: 24,000 nmi (44,000 km; 28,000 mi) at 9 kn (17 km/h; 10 mph) while displacing 3,960 long tons (4,024 t)
- Boats & landing craft carried: 2 or 6 x LCVPs
- Capacity: 2,100 tons oceangoing maximum; 350 tons main deckload
- Troops: 163
- Complement: 117
- Armament: Varied, ultimate armament; 1 × QF 12-pounder 12 cwt naval gun; 6 × 20 mm (0.79 in) Oerlikon cannon; 4 × Fast Aerial Mine (FAM) mounts

HMS LST-407 was a United States Navy LST-1-class tank landing ship that was transferred to the Royal Navy during World War II. As with many of her class, the ship was never named. Instead, she was referred to by her hull designation.

== Construction ==
LST-407 was laid down on 2 September 1942, under United States Maritime Commission (MARCOM) contract, MC hull 927, by the Bethlehem-Fairfield Shipyard, Baltimore, Maryland; launched 5 November 1942; then transferred to the United Kingdom and commissioned on 31 December 1942.

== Service history ==
LST-407 saw no active service in the United States Navy. LST-407 took part in the landings at Anzio in Italy on 22 January 1944. The tank landing ship was damaged beyond repair on 24 April 1944, and beached off Baiae, Italy. The hulk was accepted by the United States Navy on 6 May 1945. On 11 July 1945, LST-407 was struck from the Navy list. Sometime in July 1945, she was sold to a local Italian firm and scrapped.

== See also ==
- List of United States Navy LSTs

== Notes ==
Citations

== Bibliography ==
Books

- Winser, John de S. (2002). British Invasion Fleets: The Mediterranean and beyond 1942–1945. Gravesend: World Ships Society. ISBN 0-9543310-0-1.

Online resources

- "LST-407". Dictionary of American Naval Fighting Ships. Naval History and Heritage Command. This article incorporates text from this source, which is in the public domain.
- "Bethlehem-Fairfield, Baltimore MD". ShipbuildingHistory.com. 14 August 2008.
- "USS LST-407". NavSource. 15 November 2004.
