= HMS Chelmer (K221) =

1943 River-class frigate of the Royal Navy

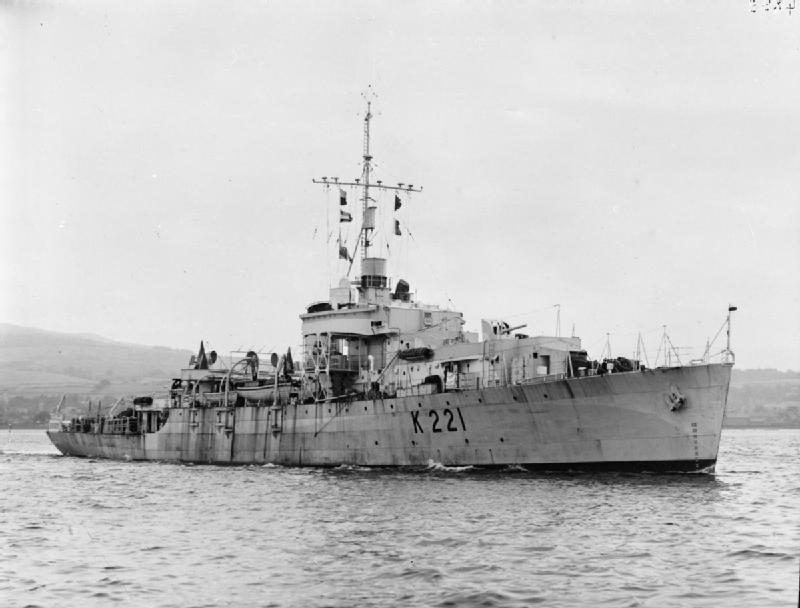
- HMS Chelmer on 14 September 1943

History

United Kingdom
- Name: Chelmer
- Namesake: River Chelmer
- Builder: George Brown & Co., Greenock
- Laid down: 29 December 1941
- Launched: 27 March 1943
- Commissioned: 29 September 1943
- Fate: Scrapped, August 1957

General characteristics
- Class & type: River-class frigate
- Displacement: 1,370 long tons (1,390 t); 1,830 long tons (1,860 t) (deep load)
- Length: 283 ft (86.26 m) p/p; 301.25 ft (91.82 m)o/a
- Beam: 36.5 ft (11.13 m)
- Draught: 9 ft (2.74 m); 13 ft (3.96 m) (deep load)
- Propulsion: Parsons single reduction steam turbines, 6,500 shp (4,800 kW)
- Speed: 20 knots (37.0 km/h)
- Range: 440 long tons (450 t; 490 short tons) oil fuel; 7,200 nautical miles (13,334 km) at 12 knots (22.2 km/h)
- Complement: 107
- Armament: 2 × QF 4-inch (102 mm) Mk.XIX guns, single mounts CP Mk.XXIII; up to 10 × QF 20 mm Oerlikon AA guns on twin mounts Mk.V and single mounts Mk.III; 1 × Hedgehog 24 spigot A/S projector; up to 150 depth charges

HMS Chelmer (K221) was a River-class frigate of the Royal Navy (RN) from 1943 to 1957. She served in convoy defence duties in the North Atlantic during World War II. Chelmer was built to the RN's specifications as a Group I River-class frigate, although Chelmer was one of the few powered by a turbine engine.

The River class was a class of 151 frigates launched between 1941 and 1944 for use as anti-submarine convoy escorts and were named for rivers in the United Kingdom. The ships were designed by naval engineer William Reed, of Smith's Dock Company of South Bank-on-Tees, to have the endurance and anti-submarine capabilities of the Black Swan-class sloops, while being quick and cheap to build in civil dockyards using the machinery (e.g. reciprocating steam engines instead of turbines) and construction techniques pioneered in the building of the Flower-class corvettes. Its purpose was to improve on the convoy escort classes in service with the Royal Navy at the time, including the Flower class.

After commissioning in January 1943, Chelmer participated in anti-submarine warfare exercises off Tobermory, Mull, Larne, and Lough Foyle before being assigned for convoy escort duty in the North Atlantic. On 6 April 1944, Chelmer picked up 36 survivors from the Norwegian merchant vessel SS Ruth I, which had been sunk by the German submarine U-302. In June 1944, Chelmer participated in the Normandy landings.

Chelmer was placed in reserve from 1946. In 1951, she underwent refitting in Leith. In August 1957, she was scrapped at Shipbreaking Industries, Charlestown.
