= Nykirken =

Church in Vestland, Norway

- "New Church"
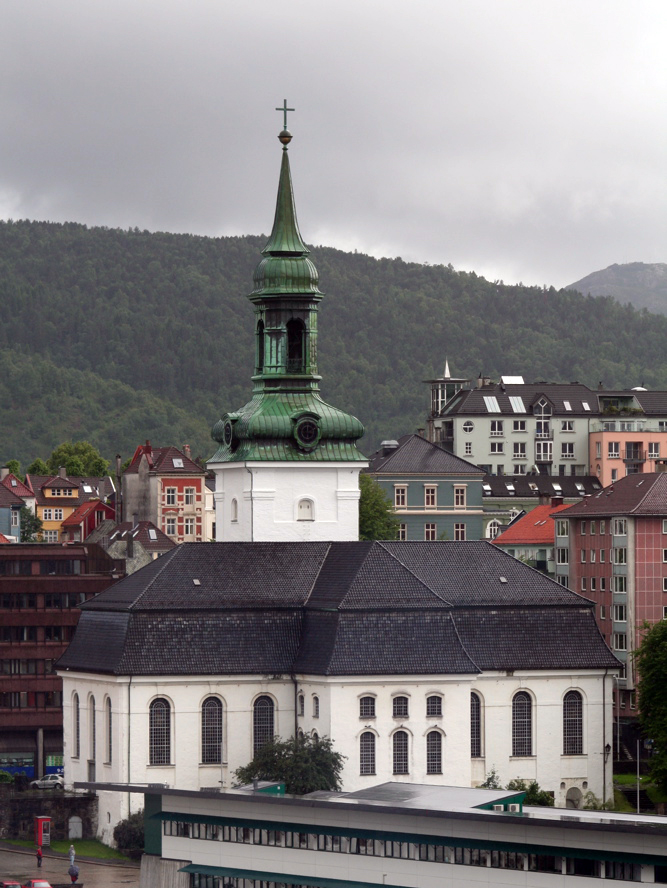
- View of the church
- Nykirken
- 60°23′50″N 5°18′48″E
- Location: Bergen, Vestland
- Country: Norway
- Denomination: Church of Norway
- Churchmanship: Evangelical Lutheran

History
- Status: Parish church
- Founded: 1621
- Consecrated: 23 November 1763

Architecture
- Functional status: Active
- Architect: Johan Joachim Reichborn
- Architectural type: Cruciform
- Completed: 1763 (263 years ago)

Specifications
- Capacity: 750
- Materials: Stone

Administration
- Diocese: Bjørgvin bispedømme
- Deanery: Bergen domprosti
- Parish: Bergen domkirke
- Norwegian Cultural Heritage Site
- Type: Church
- Status: Automatically protected
- ID: 85186

Nykirken (lit. 'The new church') is a parish church of the Church of Norway in Bergen Municipality in Vestland county, Norway. It is located in the Nordnes area of the city of Bergen. It is one of the churches for the Bergen Cathedral parish which is part of the Bergen domprosti (arch-deanery) in the Diocese of Bjørgvin.

The large, white, stone, cruciform church is located at the "Nykirkeallmenningen" square between the Strandgaten road and Vågen bay. Although it is generally known as the Nykirken, it was consecrated in 1622 by Bishop Nils Paaske as "Holy Trinity Church". When the church was originally built in 1622, there were several other churches in Bergen that were already several hundred years old, so this church was nicknamed "the new church", a name which has stuck for centuries. It is also (probably) an appropriate nickname, since the churches on this site have burned down several times and then been rebuilt, so it literally is usually the "newest" church in the central city. The current building dates back to 1764 when it was completely rebuilt and redesigned after a major fire. It has been significantly rebuilt several times since then, too, following various fires.

The church was a parish church for the Nykirken parish in central Bergen from 1622 until 2002. In 2002, several urban parishes in central Bergen were merged to form Bergen Cathedral parish. The Nykirken is still in regular use, but it has been given a special emphasis as a "children's church", putting a special emphasis on children and their families. Since 2002, the parish has started calling the church the "Children's Cathedral".

== History ==
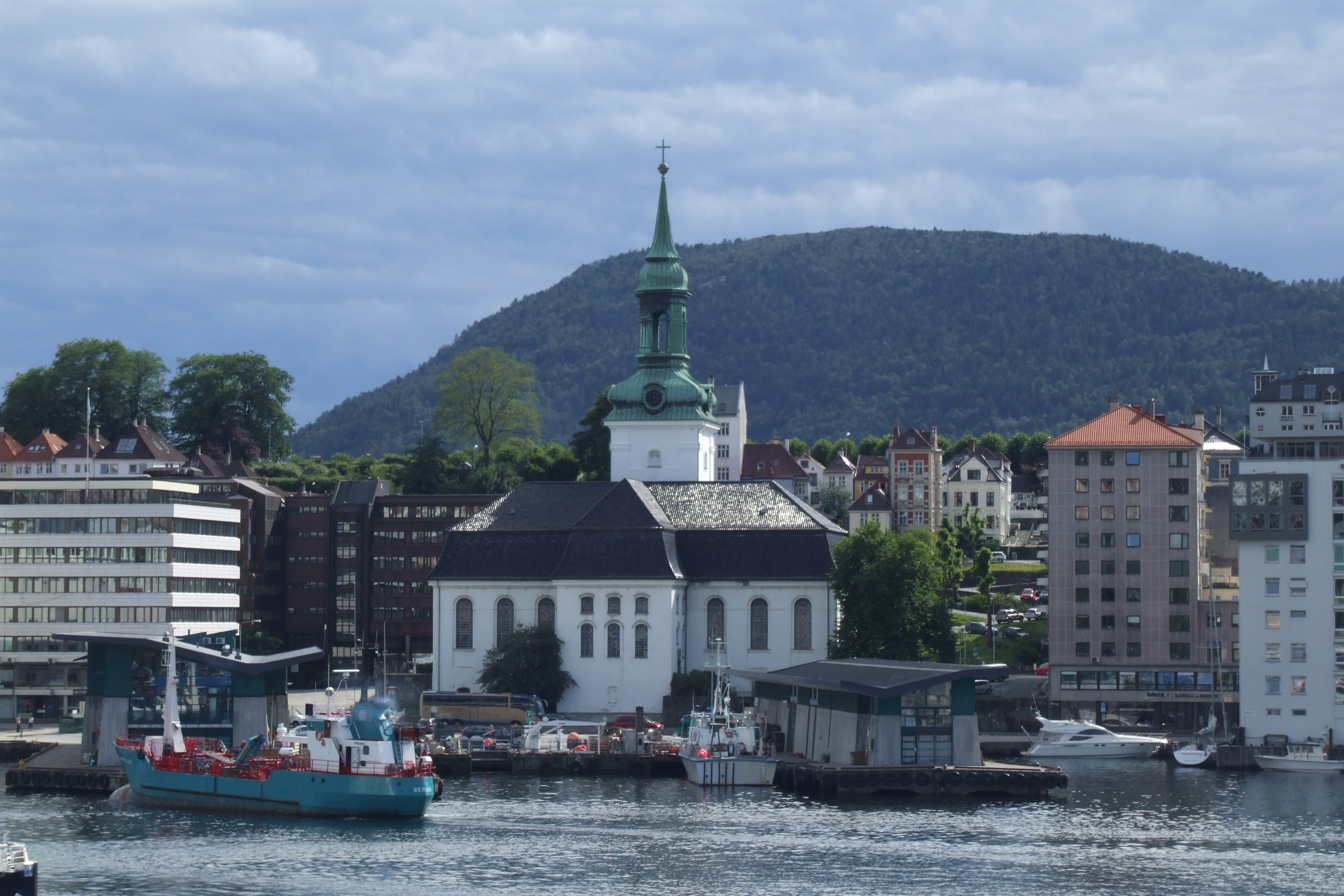
View of the church (along the Vågen shoreline)

Historically, this part of Bergen was part of the Bergen Cathedral parish, but in 1608, a royal decree established a new parish for the Stranden part of Bergen. This decree also granted the people permission to build a church at their own expense. In 1618, the people had collected enough money and land had been acquired, so work on the new church began. The new church was to be built on the site of the ruins of the home of the archbishop, a stone building that was built in the 14th century, and was destroyed by fire. The church was completed in 1621. The first church here was named the "Holy Trinity Church" and it was consecrated on 18 September 1621 by Bishop Nils Paaske. It was a simple, rectangular stone church with a chancel and nave the same width. This building only stood for two years before it burned down in early 1623. It was immediately rebuilt in the same form as the original church on the stie. In 1643, the nave was enlarged as the old chancel was incorporated into the nave and a new chancel was added in the base of the tower. In 1660, the church building was again heavily damaged by fire. It was again rebuilt, being completed in 1670. During this rebuilding project, a transverse wing to the northeast of the nave was constructed to make the church larger.

On 23 and 24 July 1756, a large fire destroyed the building. After the fire, the masonry walls church still stood, but everything else was lost. Except for the "new" wing from 1670, the rest of the church was torn down. A new church was built in 1758–1763 according to drawings by Johan Joachim Reichborn, incorporating the wing from 1670 into the new building. The foundation stone was laid on 7 July 1758. The construction work went on for a number of years, and not all the details are in accordance with Reichborn's drawings, particularly the tower. By 3 October 1759, all the walls had been built. It is a cruciform church where the transept wings are longer than the main axis of the nave. In 1760, the Mansard roof had been built. The new church was consecrated on 23 November 1763. The total cost of the new church was 53,322 rigsdaler. In 1800, another fire heavily damaged the building and the church was rebuilt the following year. The damage was such that most walls could be reused. The church was completed and re-consecrated on 25 November 1801.

In 1814, this church served as an election church (Norwegian: valgkirke). Together with more than 300 other parish churches across Norway, it was a polling station for elections to the 1814 Norwegian Constituent Assembly which wrote the Constitution of Norway. This was Norway's first national elections. Each church parish was a constituency that elected people called "electors" who later met together in each county to elect the representatives for the assembly that was to meet at Eidsvoll Manor later that year.

On 20 April 1944, during World War II, the church was once again significantly damaged by fire when the German ship Voorbode exploded in the nearby Vågen bay leaving large parts of the city of Bergen in ruins. After the fire, the congregation was hoping for a completely new church in a more central location, but the authorities insisted on restoring the old church. In the aftermath of the war, work began on rebuilding the church according to plans by Frederik Konow Lund and Hans W. Rohde. The reconstruction followed the plans of the Baroque/Rococo-style church designed by Reichborn after the fire of 1756. This time, however, the reconstruction included the tower and spire that was part of Reichborn's original drawings from the 1760s, but was never built. The church was re-consecrated on 2 December 1956.

== Internal features ==
The church has 750 seats, somewhat less than before 1944. The great majority are in high-sided box pews, although there are also some painted wooden benches, more suitable for children.

The church is informally known as 'the Children's Church' following the desire of a former Bishop of Bergen to develop this use. In consequence the interior has been largely decorated by local children. These decorations include hand-painted icons, hanging mobiles, and large paintings that have been set into double-glazing panels to form a stained-glass effect at every window in the main church building.

The 'Baptismal Angel' is a massive carved angel which descends from the ceiling of the church by means of a pulley system, bearing in its hand the bowl for infant baptisms. The original was donated in 1794 in memory of Heinrich Pütter, but was destroyed in the 1944 explosion. The replacement was donated by the nearby Bergen Cathedral, who had always been the owners of the matching angel, but kept it unused in storage. The mechanism for the angel is now electrically operated.

== Media gallery ==
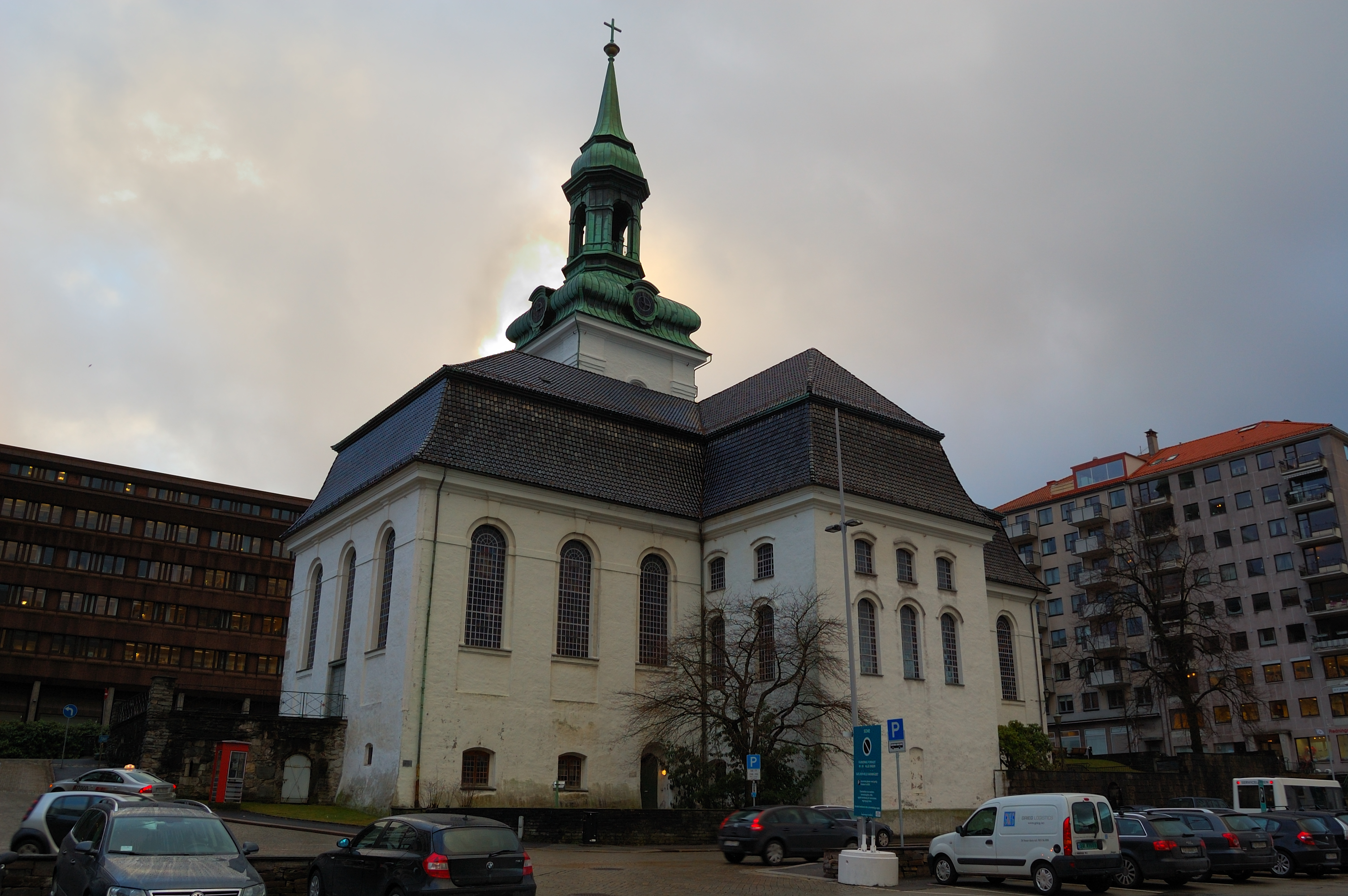

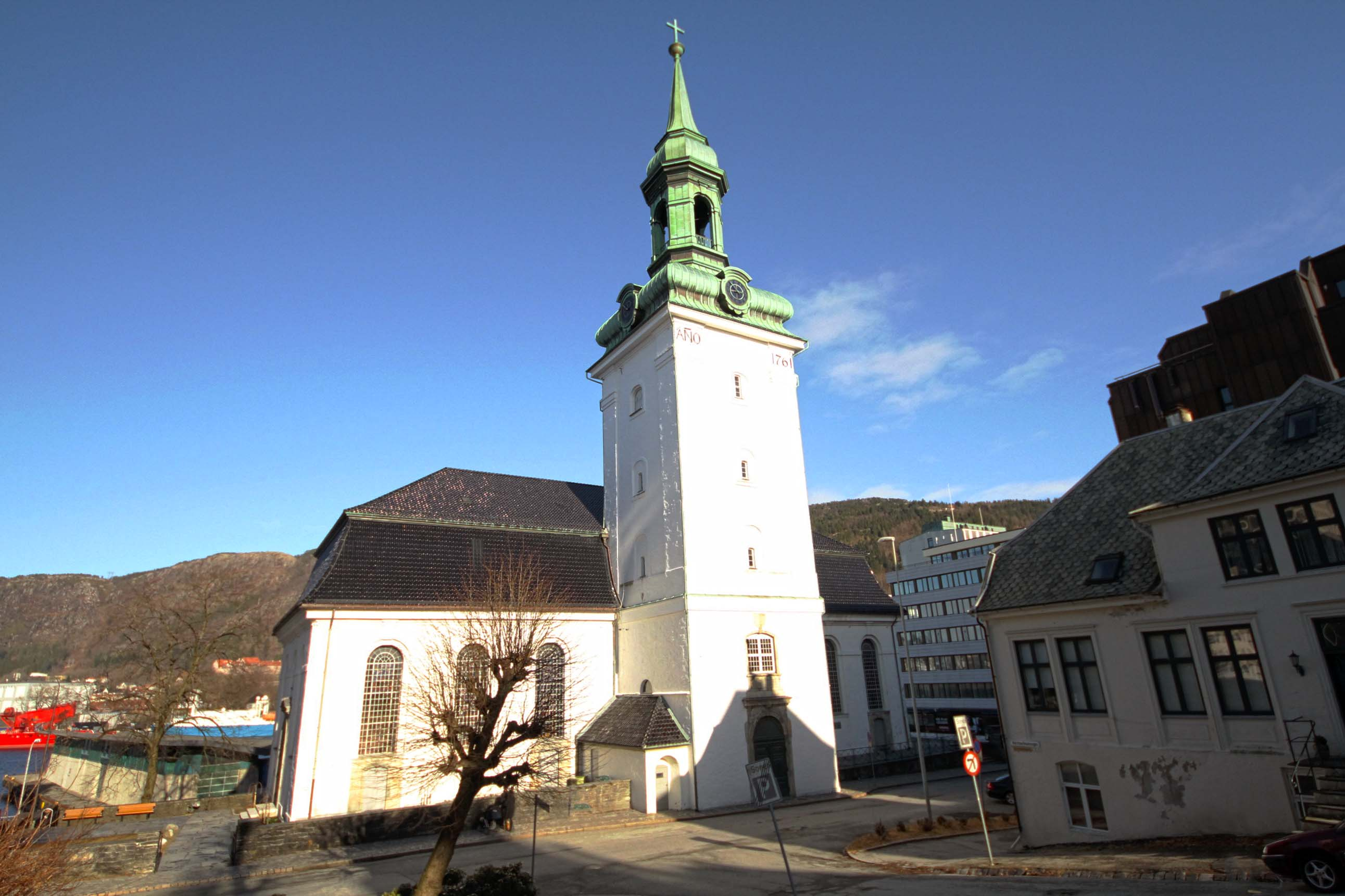

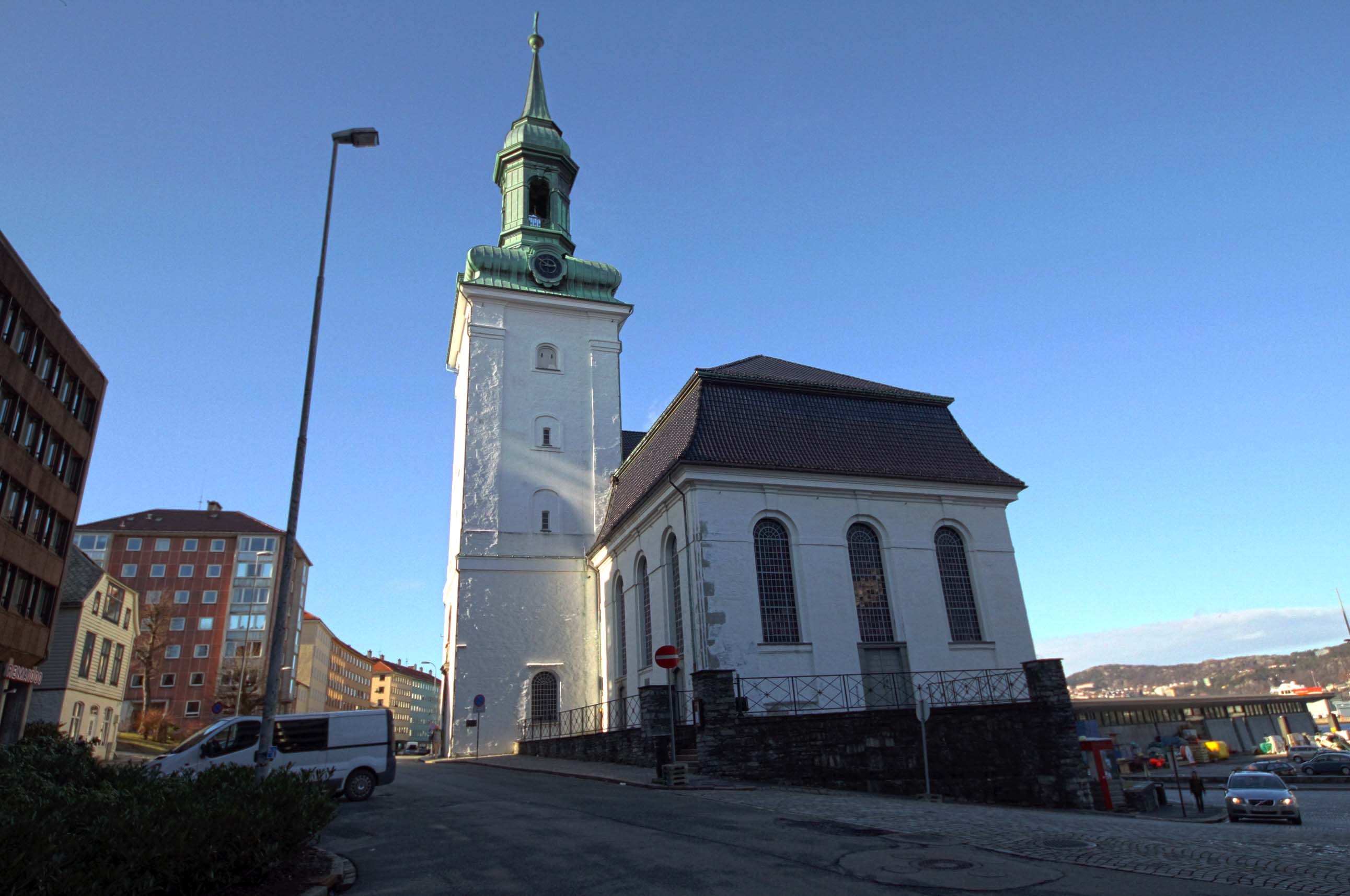

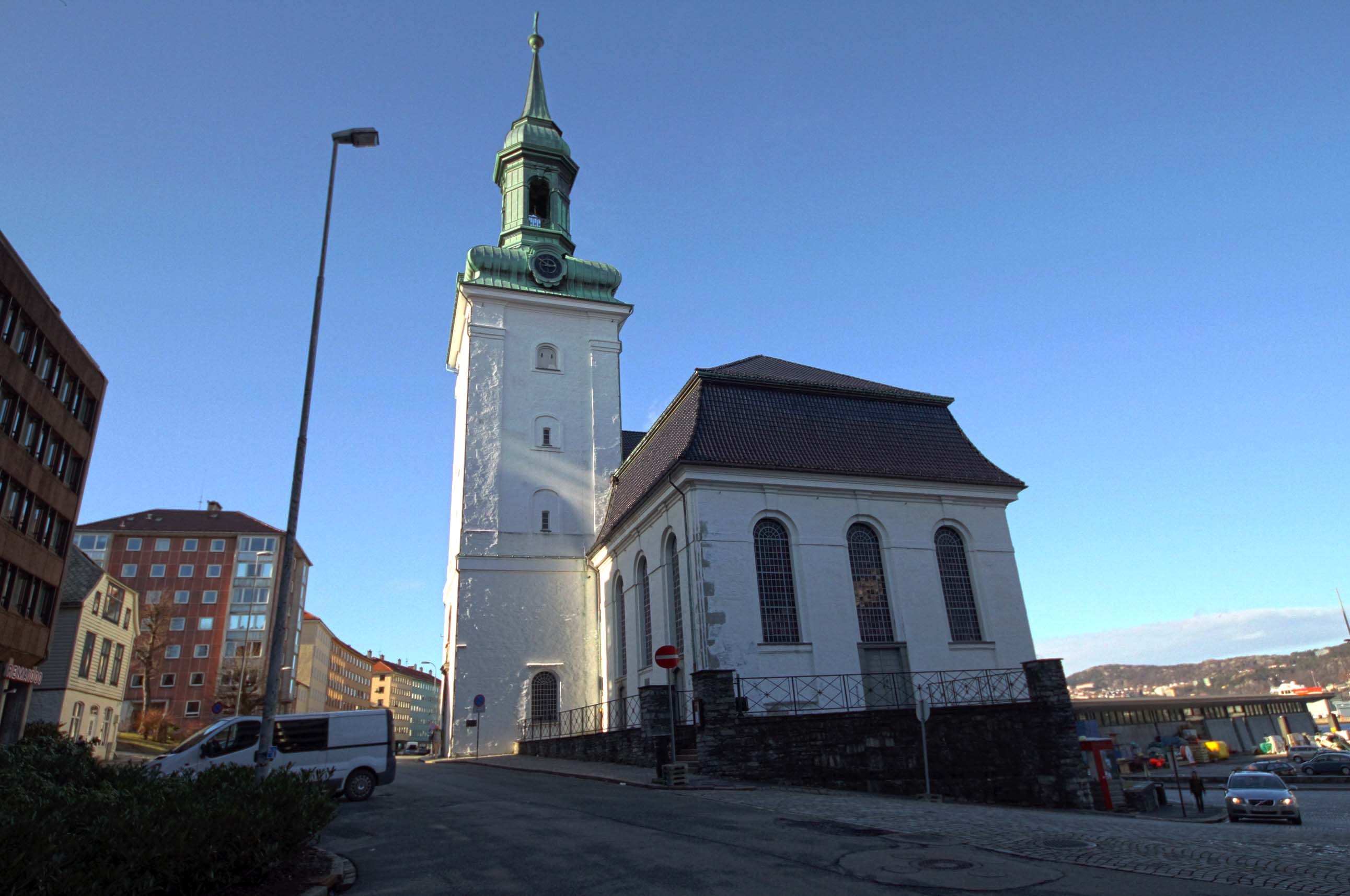

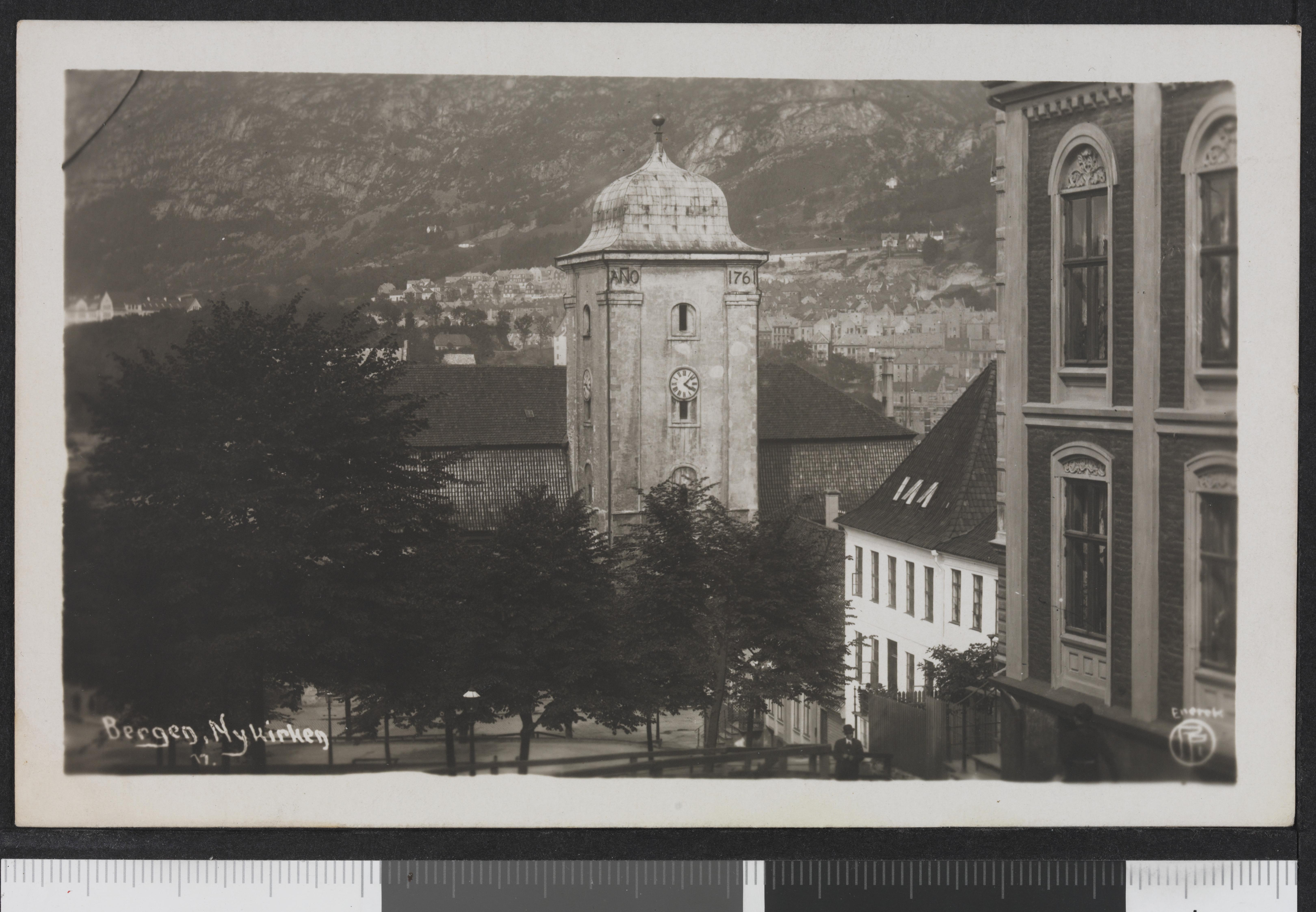
View of the church before World War II

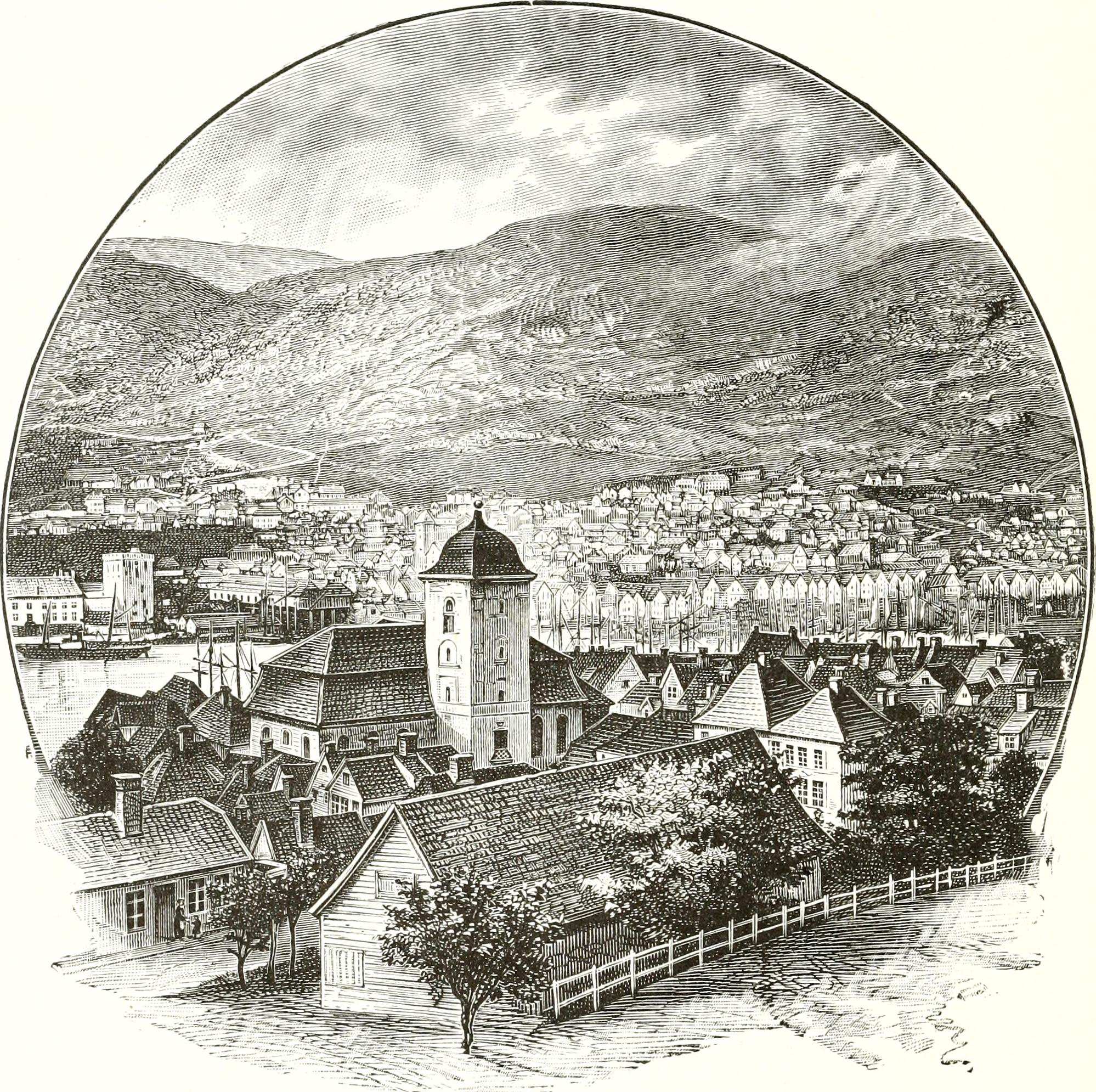
Drawing from the 19th century

== See also ==
- List of churches in Bjørgvin
