= German submarine U-302 =

German World War II submarine

Coordinates: 45°05′N 35°11′W

History

Nazi Germany
- Name: U-302
- Ordered: 6 August 1940
- Builder: Flender Werke, Lübeck
- Yard number: 302
- Laid down: 2 April 1941
- Launched: 25 April 1942
- Commissioned: 16 June 1942
- Fate: Sunk on 6 April 1944

General characteristics
- Class & type: Type VIIC submarine
- Displacement: 769 tonnes (757 long tons) surfaced; 871 t (857 long tons) submerged
- Length: 67.10 m (220 ft 2 in) o/a; 50.50 m (165 ft 8 in) pressure hull
- Beam: 6.20 m (20 ft 4 in) o/a; 4.70 m (15 ft 5 in) pressure hull
- Height: 9.60 m (31 ft 6 in)
- Draught: 4.74 m (15 ft 7 in)
- Installed power: 2,800–3,200 PS (2,100–2,400 kW; 2,800–3,200 bhp) (diesels); 750 PS (550 kW; 740 shp) (electric)
- Propulsion: 2 shafts; 2 × diesel engines; 2 × electric motors.
- Speed: 17.7 knots (32.8 km/h; 20.4 mph) surfaced; 7.6 knots (14.1 km/h; 8.7 mph) submerged
- Range: 8,500 nmi (15,700 km; 9,800 mi) at 10 knots (19 km/h; 12 mph) surfaced; 80 nmi (150 km; 92 mi) at 4 knots (7.4 km/h; 4.6 mph) submerged
- Test depth: 230 m (750 ft); Crush depth: 250–295 m (820–968 ft)
- Complement: 4 officers, 40–56 enlisted
- Armament: 5 × 53.3 cm (21 in) torpedo tubes (four bow, one stern); 14 × torpedoes or 26 TMA mines; 1 × 8.8 cm (3.46 in) deck gun (220 rounds); 1 x 2 cm (0.79 in) C/30 AA gun

Service record
- Part of: 8th U-boat Flotilla; 16 June – 30 November 1942; 11th U-boat Flotilla; 1 December 1942 – 31 May 1943; 13th U-boat Flotilla; 1 June – 31 October 1943; 9th U-boat Flotilla; 1 November 1943 – 6 April 1944
- Identification codes: M 03 384
- Commanders: Kptlt. Herbert Sickel; 16 June 1942 – 6 April 1944
- Operations: 8 patrols: 1st patrol: 2 – 6 January 1942; 2nd patrol: 10 – 29 January 1943; 3rd patrol: 2 – 21 February 1943; 4th patrol: a. 14 – 15 March 1943; b. 17 March – 17 April 1943; c. 18 – 20 April 1943; d. 29 May – 1 June 1943; 5th patrol: a. 9 June – 19 July 1943; b. 25 July 1943; 6th patrol: a. 30 July – 22 September 1943; b. 23 – 25 September 1943; 7th patrol: 6 December 1943 – 30 January 1944; 8th patrol: 11 March – 6 April 1944
- Victories: 3 merchant ships sunk (12,697 GRT)

German submarine U-302 was a Type VIIC U-boat of Nazi Germany's Kriegsmarine during World War II. The submarine was laid down on 2 April 1941 at the Flender Werke yard at Lübeck as yard number 302, launched on 25 April 1942 and commissioned on 16 June under the command of Kapitänleutnant Herbert Sickel.

During her career, the U-boat sailed on eight combat patrols, sinking three ships, before she was sunk on 6 April 1944 in mid-Atlantic by a British frigate.

She was a member of ten wolfpacks.

== Design ==
German Type VIIC submarines were preceded by the shorter Type VIIB submarines. U-302 had a displacement of 769 tonnes (757 long tons) when at the surface and 871 tonnes (857 long tons) while submerged. She had a total length of 67.10 m (220 ft 2 in), a pressure hull length of 50.50 m (165 ft 8 in), a beam of 6.20 m (20 ft 4 in), a height of 9.60 m (31 ft 6 in), and a draught of 4.74 m (15 ft 7 in). The submarine was powered by two Germaniawerft F46 four-stroke, six-cylinder supercharged diesel engines producing a total of 2,800 to 3,200 metric horsepower (2,060 to 2,350 kW; 2,760 to 3,160 shp) for use while surfaced, two Garbe, Lahmeyer & Co. RP 137/c double-acting electric motors producing a total of 750 metric horsepower (550 kW; 740 shp) for use while submerged. She had two shafts and two 1.23 m (4 ft) propellers. The boat was capable of operating at depths of up to 230 metres (750 ft).

The submarine had a maximum surface speed of 17.7 knots (32.8 km/h; 20.4 mph) and a maximum submerged speed of 7.6 knots (14.1 km/h; 8.7 mph). When submerged, the boat could operate for 80 nautical miles (150 km; 92 mi) at 4 knots (7.4 km/h; 4.6 mph); when surfaced, she could travel 8,500 nautical miles (15,700 km; 9,800 mi) at 10 knots (19 km/h; 12 mph). U-302 was fitted with five 53.3 cm (21 in) torpedo tubes (four fitted at the bow and one at the stern), fourteen torpedoes, one 8.8 cm (3.46 in) SK C/35 naval gun, 220 rounds, and a 2 cm (0.79 in) C/30 anti-aircraft gun. The boat had a complement of between forty-four and sixty.

== Service history ==
The boat's service life began with training with the 8th U-boat Flotilla in May 1942. She was then transferred to the 11th flotilla for operations on 1 December. She was reassigned to the 13th flotilla on 1 June 1943 and moved again to the 9th flotilla on 1 November.

The boat made the short journey from Kiel in Germany to Bergen in Norway, arriving on 1 December 1942.

=== First, second, third and fourth patrols ===
The submarine's first patrol began with her departure from Bergen on 2 January 1943.

Her fourth sortie finished in Narvik on 15 March 1943.

None of them was eventful.

The U-boat then made short voyages from Narvik to Trondheim to Hammerfest, (the latter lying in the far north of Norway).

=== Fifth and sixth patrols ===
Her fifth patrol took her around Bear Island, west of Svalbard, then around Bear Island again.

Her sixth effort was successful in that she sank the Soviet Dikson near Mona Island on 22 August 1943.

=== Seventh patrol ===
Leaving Trondheim on 6 December 1943, she passed through the gap between Iceland and the Faroe Islands. She arrived at La Pallice in occupied France, on 30 January 1944.

=== Eighth patrol and loss ===
Her last patrol was her most successful, sinking the Ruth I and the South America on 6 April 1944.

She was sunk later on 6 April 1944 by depth charges. from the British frigate HMS Swale northwest of the Azores.

Fifty-one men died; there were no survivors.

== Summary of raiding history ==
Date	Ship Name	Nationality	Tonnage (GRT)	Fate
28 August 1943	Dikson	Soviet Union	2,920	Sunk
6 April 1944	Ruth I	Norway	3,531	Sunk
6 April 1944	South America	Norway	6,246	Sunk

== Bibliography ==
- Busch, Rainer; Röll, Hans-Joachim (1999). German U-boat commanders of World War II : a biographical dictionary. Translated by Brooks, Geoffrey. London, Annapolis, Md: Greenhill Books, Naval Institute Press. ISBN 1-55750-186-6.
- Busch, Rainer; Röll, Hans-Joachim (1999). Der U-Boot-Krieg, 1939-1945: Deutsche U-Boot-Verluste von September 1939 bis Mai 1945 [German U-boat losses from September 1939 to May 1945] (in German). Vol. IV. Hamburg, Berlin, Bonn: Mittler. ISBN 3-8132-0514-2.
- Gröner, Erich; Jung, Dieter; Maass, Martin (1991). U-boats and Mine Warfare Vessels. German Warships 1815–1945. Vol. II. Translated by Thomas, Keith; Magowan, Rachel. London: Conway Maritime Press. ISBN 0-85177-593-4.
- Kemp, Paul (1999). U-Boats Destroyed – German Submarine Losses in the World Wars. London: Arms & Armour. ISBN 1-85409-515-3.
