= HMS Untiring =

Submarine of the Royal Navy

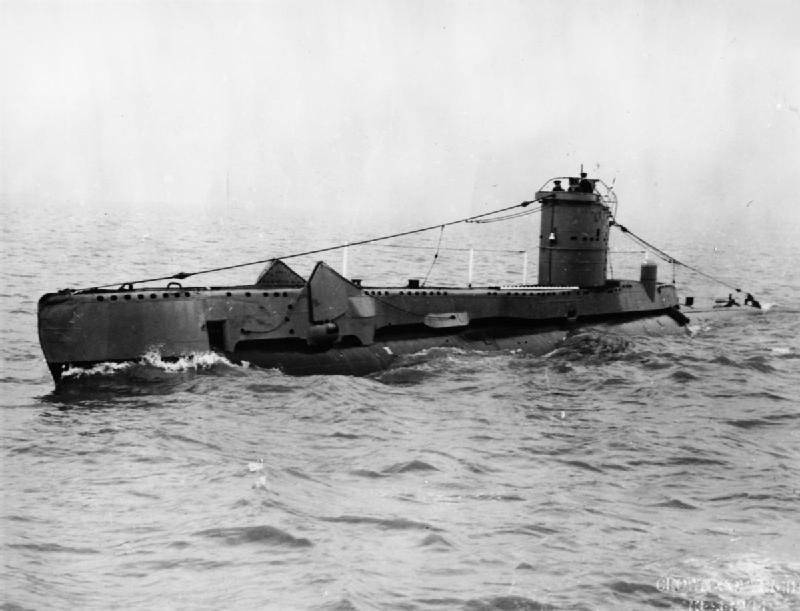

History

United Kingdom
- Name: HMS Untiring
- Builder: Vickers-Armstrongs, Newcastle upon Tyne
- Laid down: 23 December 1941
- Launched: 20 January 1943
- Commissioned: 9 June 1943
- Out of service: Loaned to Greek Navy from July 1945
- Identification: P59
- Fate: Sunk as ASDIC target 25 July 1957
- Badge

Greece
- Name: Xifias
- In service: July 1945
- Identification: Y-10
- Fate: Returned to Royal Navy in 1952

General characteristics
- Class & type: U-class submarine
- Displacement: Surfaced - 540 tons standard, 630 tons full load; Submerged - 730 tons
- Length: 58.22 m (191 ft 0 in)
- Beam: 4.90 m (16 ft 1 in)
- Draught: 4.62 m (15 ft 2 in)
- Propulsion: 2 shaft diesel-electric; 2 Paxman Ricardo diesel generators + electric motors; 615 / 825 hp
- Speed: 11.25 kn (20.84 km/h; 12.95 mph) max surfaced; 10 kn (19 km/h; 12 mph) max submerged
- Complement: 27-31
- Armament: 4 bow internal 21 inch (533 mm)torpedo tubes - 8 - 10 torpedoes; 1 - 3-inch (76 mm) gun

HMS Untiring (P59) was a Royal Navy U-class submarine built by Vickers-Armstrongs. So far she has been the only ship of the Royal Navy to bear the name Untiring. After the war, she was loaned to the Greek Navy and renamed Xifias (Y-10).

== Wartime career ==
After a work up patrol off the Norwegian coast, where she sank the Norwegian fishing vessel Havbris I whilst she was fishing for halibut, Untiring was assigned to operate in the Mediterranean. Here, she went on to sink the German netlayer Netztender 44/Prudente, the German barge F 296, the German ships Jean Suzon/FP 352 and St. Antoine/FP 358, the German auxiliary minesweeper M 6022/Enseigne, the German merchants Diana and Siena (the former French Astrée), the German auxiliary submarine chasers UJ 6075 / Clairvoyant and UJ 6078/La Havraise, and also claimed to have sunk a sailing vessel with gunfire.

She also unsuccessfully attacked the German submarine U-616, the German auxiliary submarine chaser UJ 6073/Nimeth Allah, the German torpedo boat TA18 (the former Italian Solferino), the German merchant Burgas and an unidentified German auxiliary patrol vessel.

== Greek service ==
Untiring survived the war and was loaned to the Greek Navy in July 1945, where she was renamed Xifias. She served with the Greek Navy for seven years, and was returned to the Royal Navy in 1952. She was subsequently sunk as an ASDIC target on 25 July 1957.
