= ST Voorbode =

Fishing vessel used as a transport by the Germans during World War II

History
- Fate: Exploded 1944

General characteristics
- Type: trawler

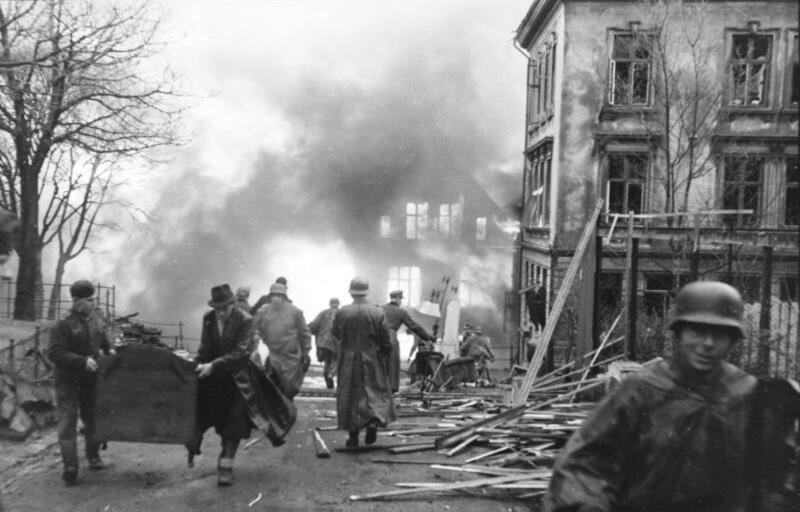
Burning and destroyed houses after the explosion

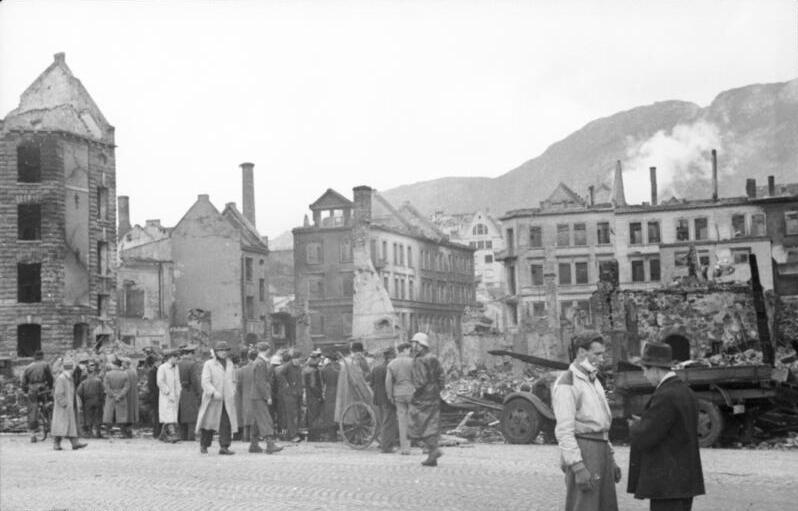
Destroyed houses in the center of Bergen, close to the quay where the ship exploded

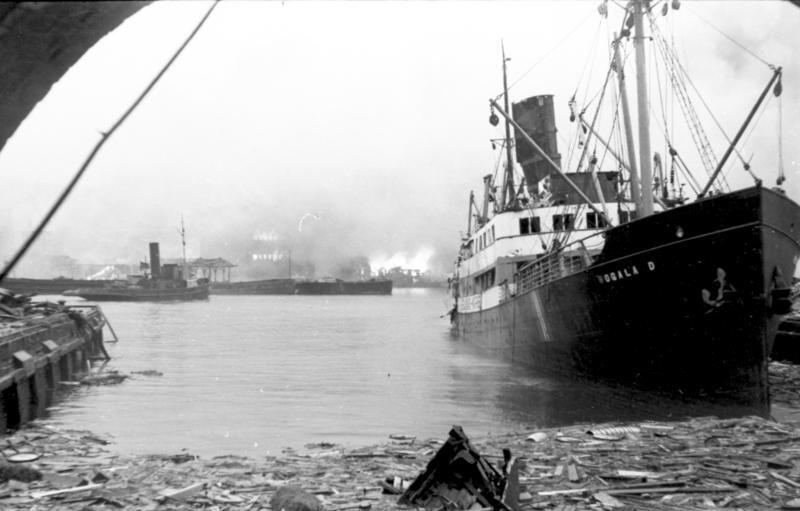
From the harbor in Bergen on the day of the explosion, in front of the vessel (SS Rogaland) there is wreckage in the harbor basin

The Dutch steam trawler Voorbode was a fishing vessel, until it was confiscated by the Germans during World War II and used for military transport. In April 1944, it was on its way from Oslo to Kirkenes when it had mechanical problems, forcing it to seek repairs in Bergen, Norway. The ship was allowed to enter Bergen harbour loaded with 124,000 kg (273,000 lb) of explosives, even though it did not satisfy security regulations and should not have been allowed into a major city with this cargo.

== Resulting damage ==
On 20 April at 8:39, the ship exploded at the quay in the center of Bergen. The force of the explosion caused a water column that was hundreds of metres high, spreading heavy debris. Several ships were thrown on land and Voorbode's anchor was later found on the 417-metre-high (1,368 ft) mountain Sandviksfjellet at 60.41756°N 5.34043°E 3 kilometres (1.9 mi) from the blast area. The air pressure from the explosion and the tsunami that followed flattened whole neighbourhoods near the harbour; then fires broke out and further destroyed the wooden houses, leaving 5,000 people homeless; 160 people were killed and 5,000 wounded, mostly civilians. The Nykirken was among the buildings which were severely damaged.

== Reporting ==
The Germans initially tried to conceal the extent of the catastrophe, probably because it exposed their failure to maintain security regulations. Because the explosion occurred on Adolf Hitler's birthday, there was some suspicion of sabotage, but investigations revealed that the explosion was an accident caused by self-ignition. Rescue efforts after the event were extensive and have been well documented.
