= SS Fort Stikine =

British Fort ship

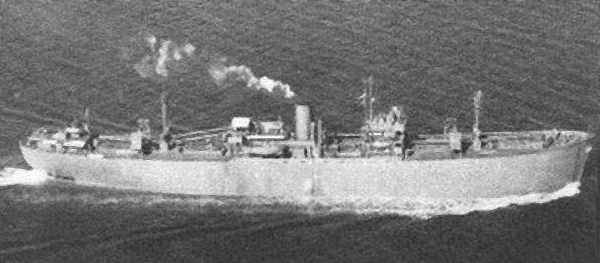
- Fort Stikine

History
- Name: Fort Stikine
- Namesake: Fort Stikine
- Owner: War Shipping Administration, on Lend Lease to the Ministry of War Transport
- Operator: Port Line Ltd
- Port of registry: London, United Kingdom
- Builder: Prince Rupert Drydock & Shipyard
- Yard number: 43
- Launched: 31 July 1942
- Out of service: 14 April 1944
- Identification: United Kingdom Official Number 168351; Code Letters BKLG
- Fate: Exploded and was obliterated 18.9528°N 72.8450°E

General characteristics
- Class & type: Fort ship
- Tonnage: 7,142 GRT; 4,261 NRT
- Length: 424 ft 2 in (129.29 m) pp; 441 ft 5 in (134.54 m) oa
- Beam: 57 ft 2 in (17.42 m)
- Draught: 26 ft 11.5 in (8.22 m)
- Depth: 35 ft 0 in (10.67 m)
- Installed power: Triple expansion steam engine, 505 NHP
- Propulsion: Screw propeller

Fort Stikine was a British Fort ship which was built in Canada in 1942. Owned by the American War Shipping Administration, she was leased under charter to the Ministry of War Transport under the Lend-Lease scheme and operated under the management of the Port Line. Fort Stikine only had a short career, and was destroyed in an explosion at Bombay, India, in April 1944 that caused the loss of a further 13 ships.

== Construction ==
Fort Stikine was 441 feet 5 inches (134.54 m) long, with a beam of 57 feet 2 inches (17.42 m). She had a depth of 35 feet 0 inches (10.67 m) and a draught of 26 feet 11.5 inches (8.22 m). The ship was propelled by a 505-NHP triple expansion steam engine, which was built by the Dominion Engineering Works, Montreal, Quebec, Canada. It had cylinders of 24.5 inches (62 cm), 37 inches (94 cm) and 70 inches (180 cm) bore by 48 inches (120 cm) stroke. Fort and Park ships were the Canadian equivalent of the American Liberty ships. All three shared a similar design by J.L. Thompson and Sons of Sunderland, England. Fort ships had a single screw propeller.

== History ==
Fort Stikine was built by Prince Rupert Drydock & Shipyard, Prince Rupert, British Columbia, Canada as yard number 43. She was built under the auspices of Wartime Merchant Shipping Ltd., a Canadian government corporation coordinating wartime shipbuilding in Canada, and on completion on 31 July 1942 delivered by that corporation to the United States War Shipping Administration (WSA) which then delivered the ship to the Ministry of War Transport under Lend Lease at Vancouver, British Columbia on the same date. Ownership was retained by WSA with the Ministry of War Transport placing her under the management of the Port Line. The United Kingdom Official Number 168351 and Code Letters BKLG were allocated. Her port of registry was London.

Fort Stikine departed from New Westminster, British Columbia, Canada on 7 September 1942 and arrived at Vancouver the next day. She then sailed to Comox, British Columbia, arriving on 10 September. She sailed two days later for Victoria, British Columbia, arriving on 13 September. Fort Stikine sailed that day for Los Angeles, California, United States, where she arrived on 23 September. She sailed five days later for Balboa, Panama, arriving on 10 October. After transiting the Panama Canal, Fort Stikine departed from Cristobal, Panama, on 17 October with Convoy ZG8. The convoy consisted eighteen merchant vessels escorted by six United States Navy warships. It arrived at Guantanamo Bay, Cuba on 21 October.

Fort Stikine departed from Guantanamo Bay on 23 October as a member of Convoy GN 14. The unescorted convoy consisted of 33 merchant ships; she arrived at New York City on 30 October. She departed on 3 November with Convoy HX 214. The convoy consisted of 33 merchant ships, escorted by a total of 17 warships over the duration of the convoy. Fort Stikine carried general cargo and mails. The convoy arrived at Liverpool, Lancashire, United Kingdom, on 14 December. She then sailed to the Clyde, arriving on 16 December.

Fort Stikine departed from the Clyde on 24 December with Convoy KMS 6G. The convoy comprised 60 merchant ships escorted by a total of 22 warships over the duration of the convoy. The CAM ship Empire Darwin also provided some protection to the convoy. Two merchant ships were lost to enemy action and another was damaged. The convoy arrived at Bône, Algeria, on 8 January 1943, but Fort Stikine had split from the convoy the previous day and arrived at Oran, Algeria. She sailed on 21 January to join Convoy MKS 6, which had departed from Philippeville, Algeria, on 19 January and arrived back at Liverpool on 1 February. The convoy consisted of 50 merchant ships escorted by a total of 30 warships over the duration of the convoy, which also included Empire Darwin. One merchant vessel was lost to enemy action. The convoy arrived at Liverpool on 1 February. Fort Stikine had left the convoy off Ireland and arrived at the Clyde on 31 January.

Fort Stikine was a member of Convoy KMS 10G, which departed from the Clyde on 26 February. It consisted of 62 merchant ships, escorted by a total of 19 warships over the duration of the convoy. One merchant ship was sunk and three were damaged by enemy action. On 4 March, U-87 attacked the convoy, but was attacked with depth charges and sunk by HMCS Shediac and HMCS St. Croix. The convoy arrived at Bône on 11 March. As with Convoy KMS 6G, Fort Stikine left the convoy and arrived at Oran a day earlier. She sailed on 31 March to join Convoy ET 16, which had departed from Bône earlier that day. The unescorted convoy included 15 merchant vessels, two of which were sunk by enemy action. ET 16 arrived at Gibraltar on 1 April. Fort Stikine then joined Convoy RS 4, which departed on 14 April. The unescorted convoy, comprising 19 merchant ships, arrived at Freetown, Sierra Leone, on 25 April. Laden with a cargo of iron ore, Fort Stikine departed with Convoy SL 129 on 11 May. The convoy, comprising 47 merchant ships and 9 warships, combined at sea with Convoy MKS 13 on 24 May. The combined convoy arrived at Liverpool on 1 June. Fort Stikine left the convoy before arrival at Liverpool and entered Loch Ewe. She then sailed to Middlesbrough, Yorkshire, via convoys WN 436 and FS 1133.

Fort Stikine departed from Middlesbrough on 20 June to join Convoy FN 1051, which had departed from Southend, Essex the previous day and arrived at Methil on 21 June. She then joined Convoy EN 246 which sailed the next day and arrived at Loch Ewe on 24 June. Fort Stikine joined Convoy ON 190, which had departed from Liverpool on 24 June. The convoy consisted of 85 merchant ships escorted by 23 warships over the duration of the convoy, which arrived at New York on 9 July. Fort Stikine sailed on to Baltimore, Maryland, arriving the next day. She departed from Baltimore on 3 August for the Hampton Roads, off the coast of Virginia. Fort Stikine sailed on 7 August with Convoy UGS 14. The convoy consisted of 106 merchant ships escorted by 31 warships over the duration of the convoy. Two merchant ships were lost to enemy action. The convoy arrived at Alexandria, Egypt on 2 September. Fort Stikine departed from Alexandria on 22 September and sailed via Port Said and Suez to Aden, where she arrived on 30 September.

On 10 October, Fort Stikine departed from Aden with Convoy AKD 3. The unescorted convoy, consisting of 18 merchant vessels, arrived at Durban, South Africa, on 29 October. She left the convoy at Beira, Mozambique, arriving on 26 October. Fort Stikine sailed on 11 November and joined Convoy DKA 6. The unescorted convoy, consisting of 20 merchant ships in total, had departed from Durban five days earlier and arrived at Aden on 28 November, but Fort Stikine had put into Dar es Salaam, Tanganyika, where she arrived on 17 November. She sailed on 20 November for Mombasa, Kenya, arriving the next day. She sailed a week later for Aden, from where she departed on 9 December for Suez and Port Said, arriving at the latter port on 19 December. Fort Stikine was a member of Convoy GUS 25, which departed from Port Said on 16 December. The convoy, consisting of 106 merchant ships escorted by 16 warships over its duration, arrived at the Hampton Roads on 17 January 1944. One merchant vessel was lost to enemy action. Fort Stikine left the convoy at Gibraltar, where she arrived on 28 December 1943.

Laden with copper, sisal, and general cargo, Fort Stikine departed from Gibraltar on 11 January 1944 as a member of Convoy MKS 36G. The convoy, of 20 merchant ships and five escorting warships, made a rendezvous at sea with Convoy SL 145 the next day. The combined convoy arrived at Liverpool on 24 January.

Fort Stikine loaded at Birkenhead, Cheshire. Her cargo was described as general cargo; it consisted 1,396 long tons (1,418 t) of flares and signal rockets, incendiary bombs, mines, shells, and torpedoes. These were bound for Bombay, India. A container with 31 crates each containing four gold bars was loaded in № 2 hold. Each gold bar weighed 28 pounds (12.70 kg). She was also carrying 12 Supermarine Spitfire aircraft, some gliders, and a further quantity of explosives that were destined to be offloaded at Karachi, India.

Fort Stikine joined Convoy OS 69KM, which departed from Liverpool on 23 February 1944. The convoy, consisting of 49 merchant ships escorted by 12 warships, split at sea on 5 March. The two convoys thus formed were OS 69, which arrived at Freetown on 15 March; and Convoy KMS 43G, which arrived at Gibraltar on 6 March. During the voyage to Gibraltar, a stowaway was discovered. He was put to work under the charge of the ship's chief engineer.

Fort Stikine continued her voyage as part of Convoy KMS 43, which departed from Gibraltar that day. The convoy, consisting of 81 merchant ships and four escorting warships, arrived at Port Said on 16 March, having evaded an attack by four Focke-Wulf Fw 200 Condor aircraft. She sailed on to Suez, from where she departed the next day for Aden. The stowaway was offloaded at Port Tawfiq, Suez. Having reached Aden on 23 March, she sailed the same day for Karachi, arriving on 30 March.

To replace the cargo offloaded at Karachi, 8,700 bales of raw cotton were loaded, along with various quantities of fish manure, resin, rice, scrap iron, sulphur, and timber. Added to this were 1,000 barrels of lubricating oil. The ship's captain was concerned about having to take the flammable items, but was told that they had to go. A proposal to add 750 drums of turpentine was refused. The ship's officers also expressed concerns over mixing the cargoes of cotton and the oil and explosives, but were unable to find paperwork that advised against this practice. In 1942, the United States government had published a book that advised against the carriage of raw cotton. A common myth at the time was that wet cotton bales could spontaneously combust. This was not the case, although cotton soaked in oil would readily do so. Before the ship sailed, the crew discovered that the barrels of lubricating oil leaked. Tarpaulins were nailed over the lower hold covers and the firefighting equipment on board was thoroughly tested. Extra fire drills were scheduled during the voyage to Karachi. Fort Stikine sailed on 9 April to join Convoy PB 74, which had departed from Bandar Abbas, Iran on 6 April. The unescorted convoy arrived at Bombay on 12 April.

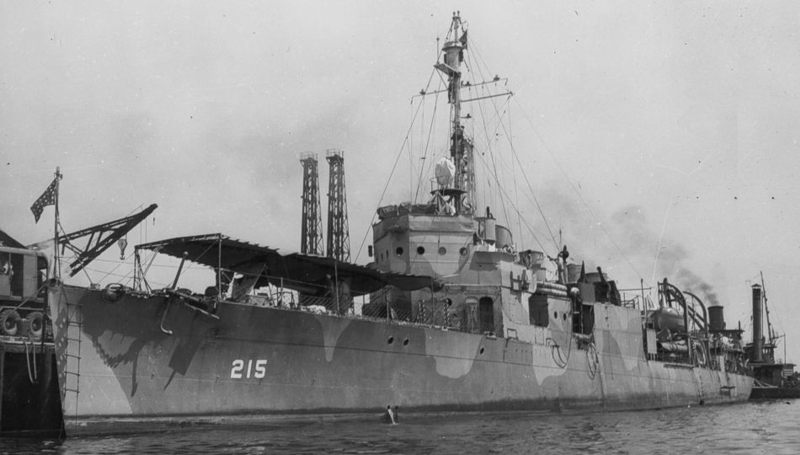
The Clemson-class destroyer USS Borie was one of the six warships that escorted Convoy ZG 8.

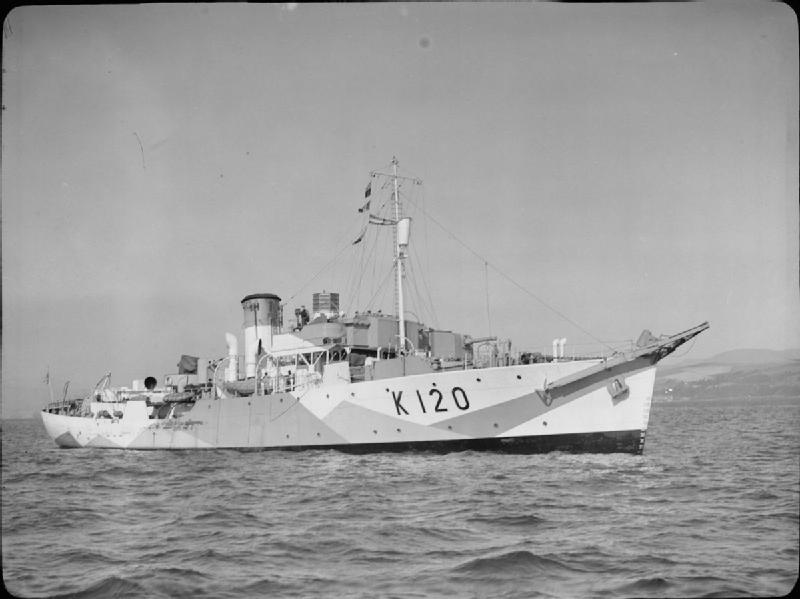
The Flower-class corvette HMS Borage was one of the seventeen escorts of Convoy HX 214.

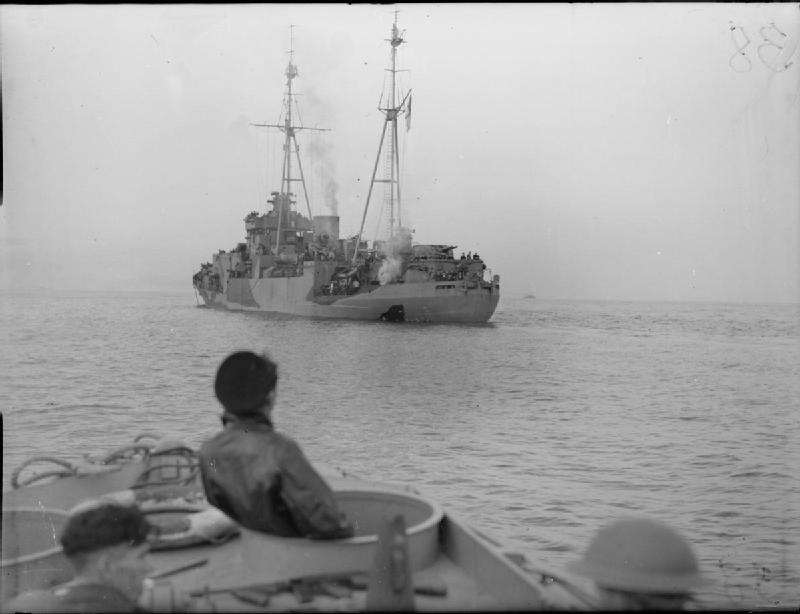
Flak ship HMS Pozarica was one of the 30 escorts of Convoy MKS 6.

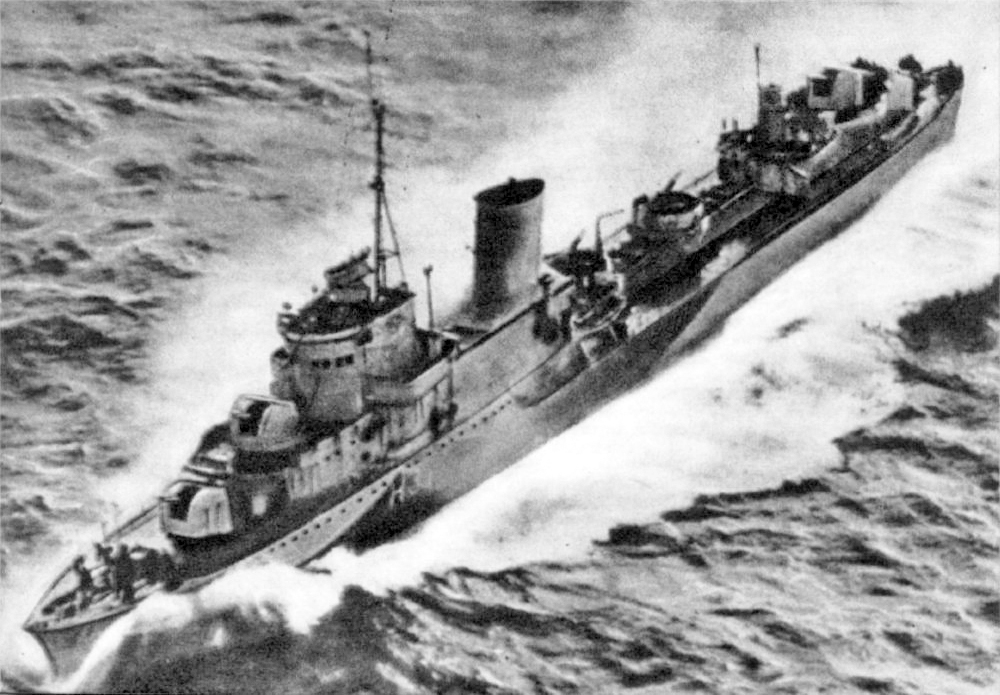
Grom-class destroyer ORP Błyskawica was one of the nine warships that escorted Convoy SL 129.

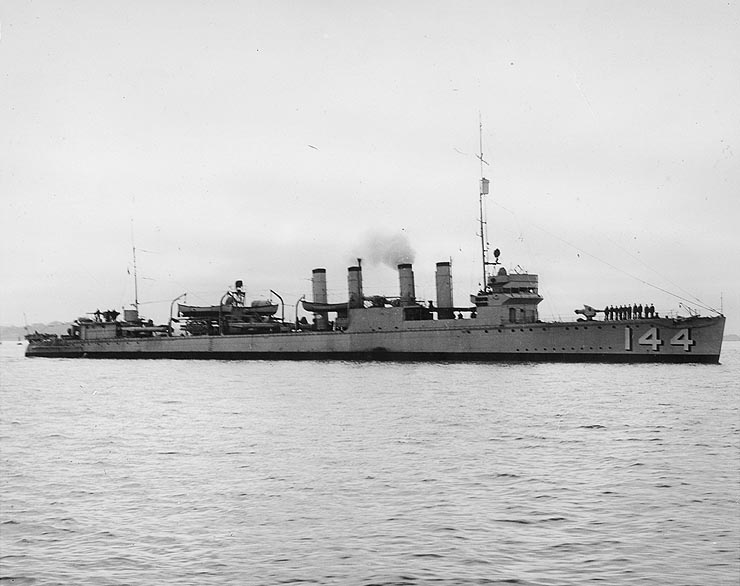
The Wickes-class destroyer USS Upshur was one of 23 warships that escorted Convoy UGS 14.

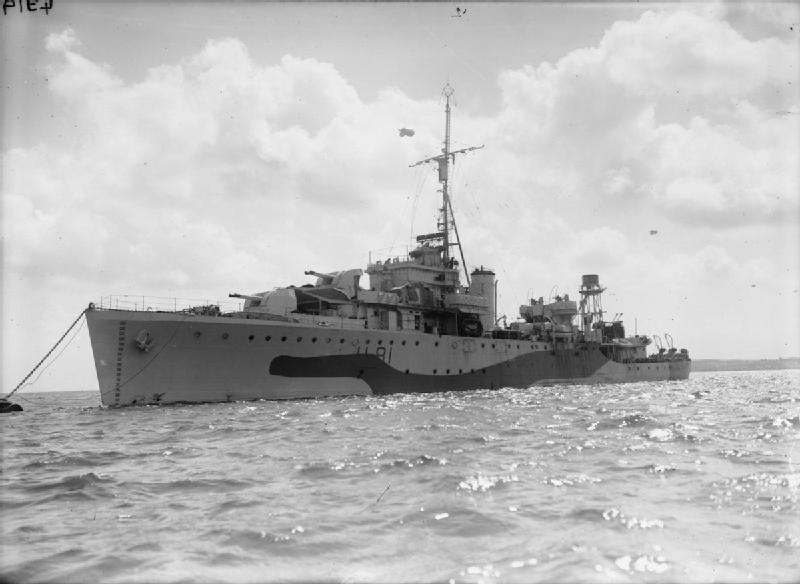
The Bittern-class sloop HMS Stork was one of the sixteen warships that escorted Convoy GUS 25.

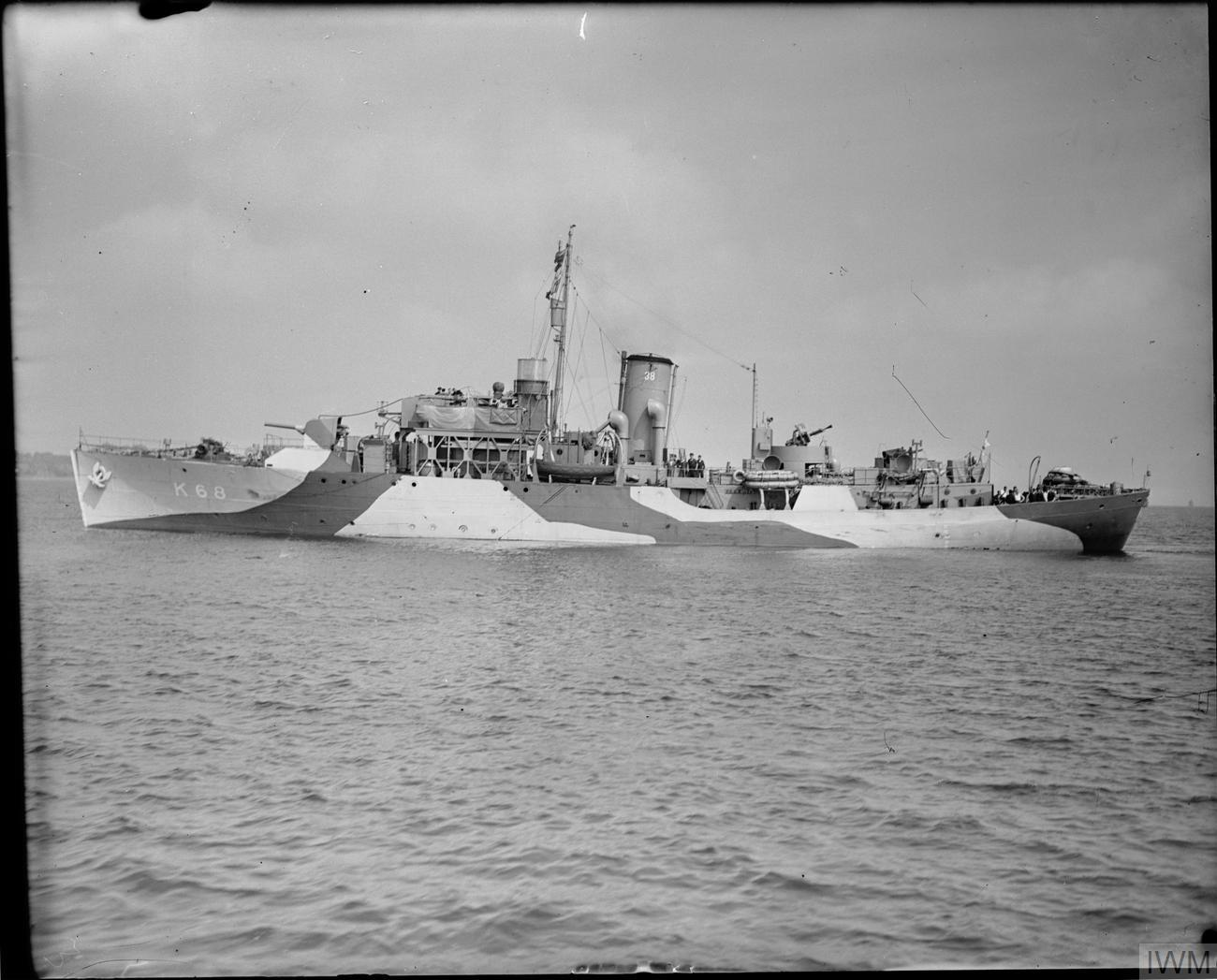
The Flower-class corvette HMS Jonquil was one of the four escorts of Convoy OS 69KM.

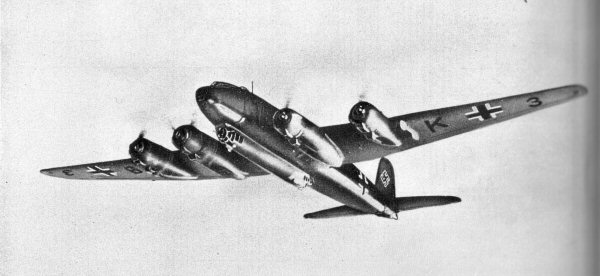
Convoy KMS 43 successfully evaded an attack by Focke-Wulf Fw 200 Condor aircraft.

== Loss ==
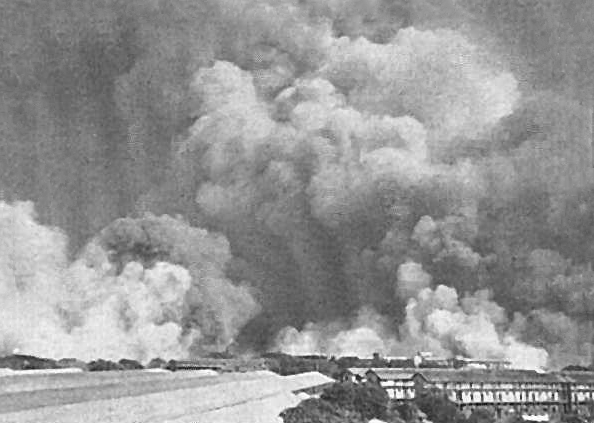
A cloud of smoke was over Bombay following the first explosion on board Fort Stikine.

Fort Stikine arrived at Bombay in the early morning of 12 April. Having taken on a pilot shortly before 10:00, she was docked at the Victoria Dock at midday. The practice of flying a red flag to signify dangerous cargo on board had been discontinued in wartime, as doing so would identify such vessels in the event of an enemy air raid on a port. Also, the practice on unloading such vessels into lighters offshore had also been discontinued due to the war. At the time, explosives were graded as category A, B, or C. Category A explosives, such as those carried on board Fort Stikine, were the most dangerous. These were only allowed to be offloaded onto lighters, and not directly to the quayside.

Unloading of Fort Stikine began with the lubricating oil, followed by the fish manure. An extra gang of stevedores was employed on this task, which continued through the night of 13–14 April. At midday on 13 April, lighters arrived for the explosives. Minor engine repairs also started at that time, rendering the ship unable to move under her own power. At 12:30, the chief officer of Fort Crevier noticed smoke issuing from the ventilators of the № 2 hold of Fort Stikine. This was also seen a short time later by a DEMS gunner on board Iran. Despite being seen by these (and other) witnesses, everyone assumed that the situation was under control. The alarm was not raised until 13:45. The fire pump in the ship's engine room was started and the firefighting operation began.

With crew members and stevedores abandoning ship, the dock authorities realized that there was a problem on board Fort Stikine. A fire crew was sent on board and an order was given for more fire engines to be sent for. Due to difficulties in contacting the fire control centre, initially only two engines were sent. Those on board Fort Stikine were unable to discover the seat of the fire and water was poured blindly into the hold. With the arrival of the two fire appliances, now 11 hoses were in use. Captain Oberst, of the Indian Army Ordnance Corps, arrived a few minutes later to assess the situation. He was in charge of the explosives only after they had been landed. A meeting was held on board between the ship's officers, Oberst, and Commander Longmore of the Royal Indian Navy, the chief salvage officer in Bombay. Oberst stated that Fort Stikine had explosives equivalent to 150 blockbuster bombs on board and that the ship should be scuttled. Her captain countered that the boiler room and engine room could be flooded, but he doubted that the ship would sink in that condition. More fire appliances arrived, bringing the total number of hoses in use to 32. By 14:45, ammunition in № 2 hold was exploding. Colonel Sadler, the general manager of the docks at Bombay, was sent for. He arrived at 14:50 and suggested that Fort Stikine should be removed from the docks, which would have required the use of tugs due to Fort Stikine being disabled. An argument developed and Colonel Sadler's parting remark was that the ship would probably explode before she could be taken out of port.

Shortly after 15:00, two fireboats, Doris and Panwell, arrived. A further nine hoses were played on the ship. Neither of the two people who could have taken overall charge of the situation was contactable, and none of those on board Fort Stikine were willing to take charge. Firefighting continued, but at 15:50, a flame erupted from the hold, reaching higher than the ship's mast. The order was given to abandon ship, with some jumping from the ship onto the quayside, and others into the water. At 16:06, an explosion occurred on board Fort Stikine. The ship was split in two, with her boiler found half a mile (800 m) away. The explosion caused a tsunami within the dock, which deposited one vessel on the quayside. At 16:33, a second explosion occurred. The cargo ship Jalapadma had her stern blown off. It landed about 200 yards (200 m) away. This explosion also wrecked the cargo liner Baroda.

=== Investigation ===
The accident was investigated by the authorities at Bombay. The report released on 11 September 1944 concluded that the fire and subsequent explosion on Fort Stikine was an accident. Sabotage was ruled out. The death toll was given as 231 service and port personnel killed, with 476 injured. Civilian casualties were in excess of 500 killed, with 2,408 treated in hospitals.

=== Ships lost or severely damaged ===
Apart from Fort Stikine, these vessels were sunk or severely damaged:

Ship	Flag or operator	Notes
Baroda	United Kingdom	Baroda was a 3,172 GRT cargo liner owned by the British India Steam Navigation Company. The vessel was burnt out. She was beached on Green Island and consequently sold for scrap in December 1944.
HMHS Chantilly	United Kingdom	Chantilly was a 10,017 GRT hospital ship that was formerly a French passenger ship. She was repaired and was returned to her French owners after the war.
HMIS El Hind	Royal Indian Navy	El Hind was a 5,319 GRT passenger ship used by the Scindia Steam Navigation Company Ltd. for the conveyance of pilgrims. She had been requisitioned by the Royal Indian Navy as a landing ship, infantry. She caught fire and sank.
Empire Confidence	United Kingdom	Empire Confidence was a 5,023 GRT cargo ship. She was damaged by the explosion, but continued in service, sailing to Australia to load a cargo of grain, as the explosion caused a local famine.
Empire Indus	United Kingdom	Empire Indus was a 5,155 GRT cargo ship. She was severely damaged by the explosion, but was repaired, returning to service in November 1945.
Fort Crevier	United Kingdom	Fort Crevier was a 7,142 GRT Fort ship. She was burnt out and declared a constructive total loss. The vessel was used as a hulk until 1948, when she was scrapped.
Generaal van der Heyden	Netherlands	Generaal van der Heyden was a 1,213 GRT cargo ship of the Koninklijke Paketvaart-Maatschappij. She caught fire and sank, with a loss of 15 crew.
Generaal van Sweiten	Netherlands	Generaal van Sweiten was a 1,300 GRT cargo ship of the Koninklijke Paketvaart-Maatschappij; she caught fire and sank, with a loss of two crew.
Graciosa	Norway	Graciosa was a 1,173 GRT cargo ship owned by Skibs A/S Fjeld and operated under the management of Hans Kiær & Co. Severely damaged, she was declared a total loss and was sold for scrap in July 1944.
Iran	Panama	Iran was a 5,677 GRT Standard World War I cargo ship operated by the Iran Steamship Company under the management of Wallem & Co. Ltd. She was severely damaged and was scrapped.
Jalapadma	United Kingdom	Jalapadma was a 3,857 GRT cargo ship of the Scindia Steam Navigation Company. Pushed on shore, she was scrapped.
Kingyuan	United Kingdom	Kingyuan was a 2,653 GRT cargo ship of the China Navigation Company. She caught fire and sank.
HMS LCP 323	(United Kingdom) Royal Navy	The Landing Craft, Personnel was sunk.
HMS LCP 866	(United Kingdom) Royal Navy	The Landing Craft, Personnel was sunk.
Norse Trader	Panama	Norse Trader was a 3,507 GRT cargo ship owned by Wallem & Co., Hong Kong.
Rod El Farag	Egypt	Rod El Farag was a 6,292 GRT cargo liner of the Sociète Misr de Navigation Maritime. She was gutted by fire. Declared a total loss, she was sunk for use as a jetty.
Tinombo	Netherlands	Tinombo was a 872 GRT coaster owned by the Koninklijke Packetvaart Maatschappij. She was heavily damaged and sank, with a loss of eight crew.

== See also ==
- List of Allied convoys during World War II by region
- Port Chicago disaster
- SS Mont-Blanc, the ship destroyed in the Halifax Explosion during World War I
