= SS Mont-Blanc =

French cargo ship

Coordinates: 44.6688°N 63.5973°W

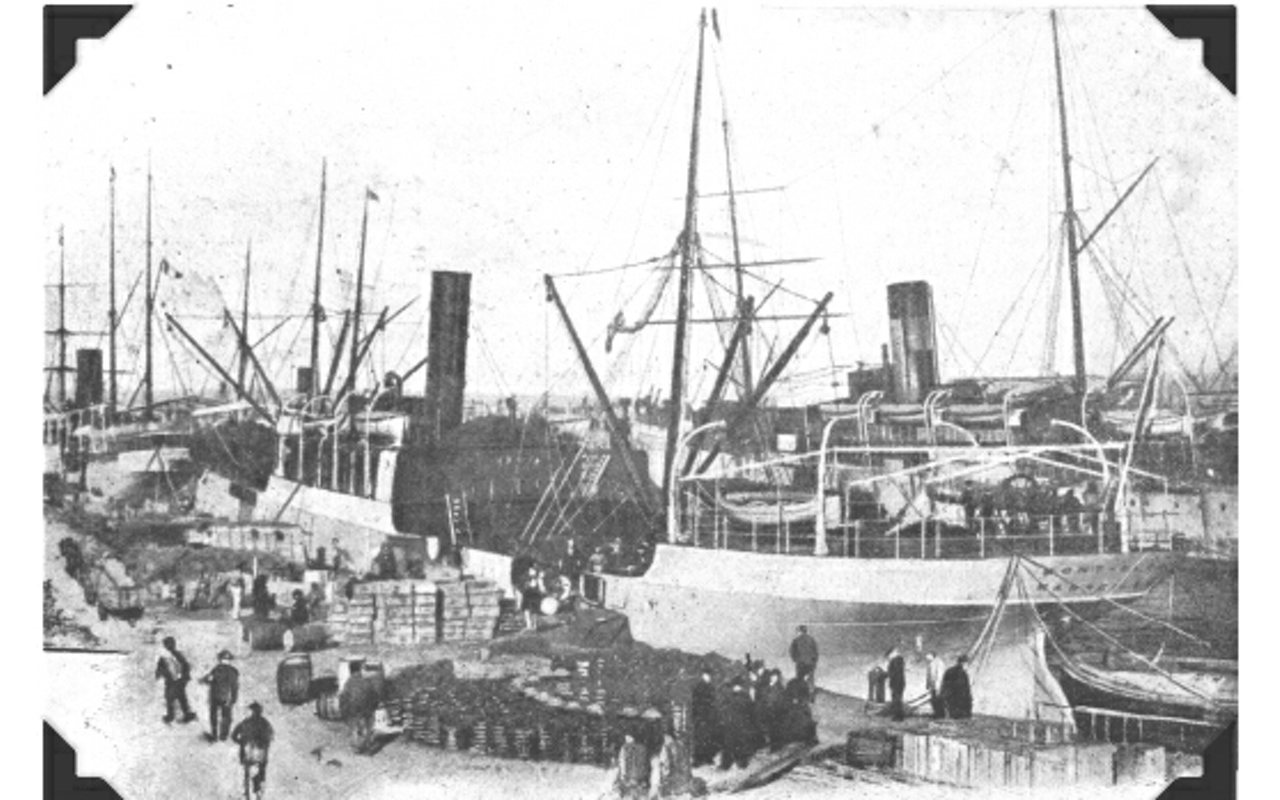
- Mont-Blanc in 1899

History

France
- Name: Mont Blanc
- Namesake: Mont Blanc
- Owner: 1899: Société Générale de Transports Maritimes à Vapeur; 1906: E. Anquetil; 1915: Gaston Petit; 1915: Compagnie Générale Transatlantique
- Port of registry: 1899: Marseille; 1906: Rouen; 1915: Saint-Nazaire
- Builder: Sir Raylton Dixon & Co, Middlesbrough
- Yard number: 460
- Laid down: March 23, 1899
- Launched: March 25, 1899
- Completed: June 1899
- Maiden voyage: November 1900
- Identification: code letters KHTN
- Fate: disintegrated after collision with SS Imo, December 6, 1917

General characteristics
- Type: cargo ship
- Tonnage: 3,279 GRT, 1,919 NRT
- Length: 97.5 m (320.0 ft)
- Beam: 13.7 m (44.8 ft)
- Depth: 4.7 m (15.3 ft)
- Installed power: 247 NHP
- Propulsion: 1 × triple-expansion engine; 1 × screw
- Armament: in WW1: 2 × naval guns

SS Mont-Blanc was a cargo steamship that was built in Middlesbrough, England, in 1899 for a French shipping company. On Thursday morning, December 6, 1917, she entered Halifax Harbour in Nova Scotia, Canada, laden with a full cargo of highly volatile explosives. As she made her way through the Narrows towards Bedford Basin, she was involved in a collision with Imo, a Norwegian ship. A fire aboard the ship ignited her wet and dry cargo - 2,300 tons of picric acid, 500 tons of TNT, and 10 tons of guncotton. The resultant Halifax Explosion killed about 2,000 people and injured about 9,000.

== Building and owners ==
The Raylton Dixon & Co shipyard built Mont-Blanc in Middlesbrough, England, as Yard Number 460 for the Société Générale de Transport Maritime (SGTM). She was a typical three island-style general cargo ship. Mont-Blanc was built to the same set of plans used to build the New Zealand steamship SS Whangape, a sister ship launched a few months after Mont-Blanc. The SGTM registered Mont-Blanc at Marseille. Her code letters were KHTN. She was launched on 25 March 1899 and completed that June.

Mont-Blanc was a tramp steamer. In 1906, a ship-owner called E. Anquetil acquired her and registered her in Rouen. In 1915, she passed to another Rouen ship owner called Gaston Petit. On 28 December 1915, the Compagnie Générale Transatlantique (CGT) acquired her, and registered her in Saint-Nazaire.

== Final voyage to Halifax ==
She was chartered to carry a complete cargo of miscellaneous types of military explosives from New York City to France in November 1917. Mont-Blanc was not an especially old vessel, but was a relatively slow, common tramp steamer, typical of many wartime freighters. She left New York City on December 1 to join a convoy in Halifax, Nova Scotia. She arrived from New York late on 5 December, under the command of Aimé Le Medec. The vessel was fully loaded with the explosives TNT, picric acid, and guncotton in the hold, with barrels on deck containing the high-octane fuel benzole, which itself consisted mainly of the highly volatile and easily ignited hydrocarbons benzene and toluene. She intended to join a slow convoy gathering in Bedford Basin readying to depart for Europe, but was too late to enter the harbour before the submarine nets were raised. Ships carrying dangerous cargo were not allowed into the harbour before the war, but the risks posed by German submarines had resulted in a relaxation of regulations.

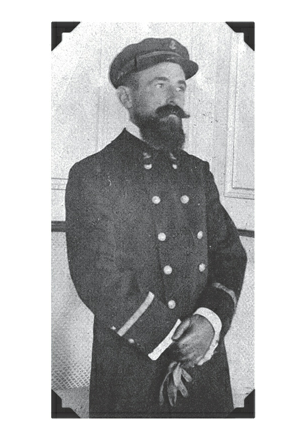
Aime Le Medec, captain of Mont-Blanc

Francis Mackey, an experienced harbour pilot, had boarded Mont-Blanc on the evening of 5 December; he had asked about "special protections" such as a guard ship given the steamer's cargo, but no protections were put in place. Mont-Blanc started moving at 7:30 am on 6 December, heading towards Bedford Basin. Mackey kept his eye on the ferry traffic between Halifax and Dartmouth and other small boats in the area. He first spotted the outbound SS Imo when she was about 1.21 kilometres (0.75 mi) away and became concerned as her path appeared to be heading towards his ship's starboard side, as if to cut him off his own course. Mackey gave a short blast of his ship's signal whistle to indicate that he had the right of way, but was met with two short blasts from Imo, indicating that the approaching vessel would not yield her position. The captain ordered Mont-Blanc to halt her engines and angle slightly to starboard, closer to the Dartmouth side of the Narrows. He let out another single blast of his whistle, hoping the other vessel would likewise move to starboard, but was again met with a double blast in negation.

Sailors on nearby ships heard the series of signals, and realizing that a collision was imminent, gathered to watch as Imo bore down on Mont-Blanc. Though both ships had cut their engines by this point, their momentum carried them right on top of each other at slow speed. Unable to ground his ship for fear of a shock that would set off his explosive cargo, Mackey ordered Mont-Blanc to steer hard to port (starboard helm) and crossed the Norwegian ship's bow in a last-second bid to avoid a collision. The two ships were almost parallel to each other, when Imo suddenly sent out three signal blasts, indicating the ship was reversing its engines. The combination of the cargoless ship's height in the water and the transverse thrust of her right-hand propeller caused the ship's head to swing into Mont-Blanc. Imo's prow pushed into the French vessel's No. 1 hold on her starboard side.

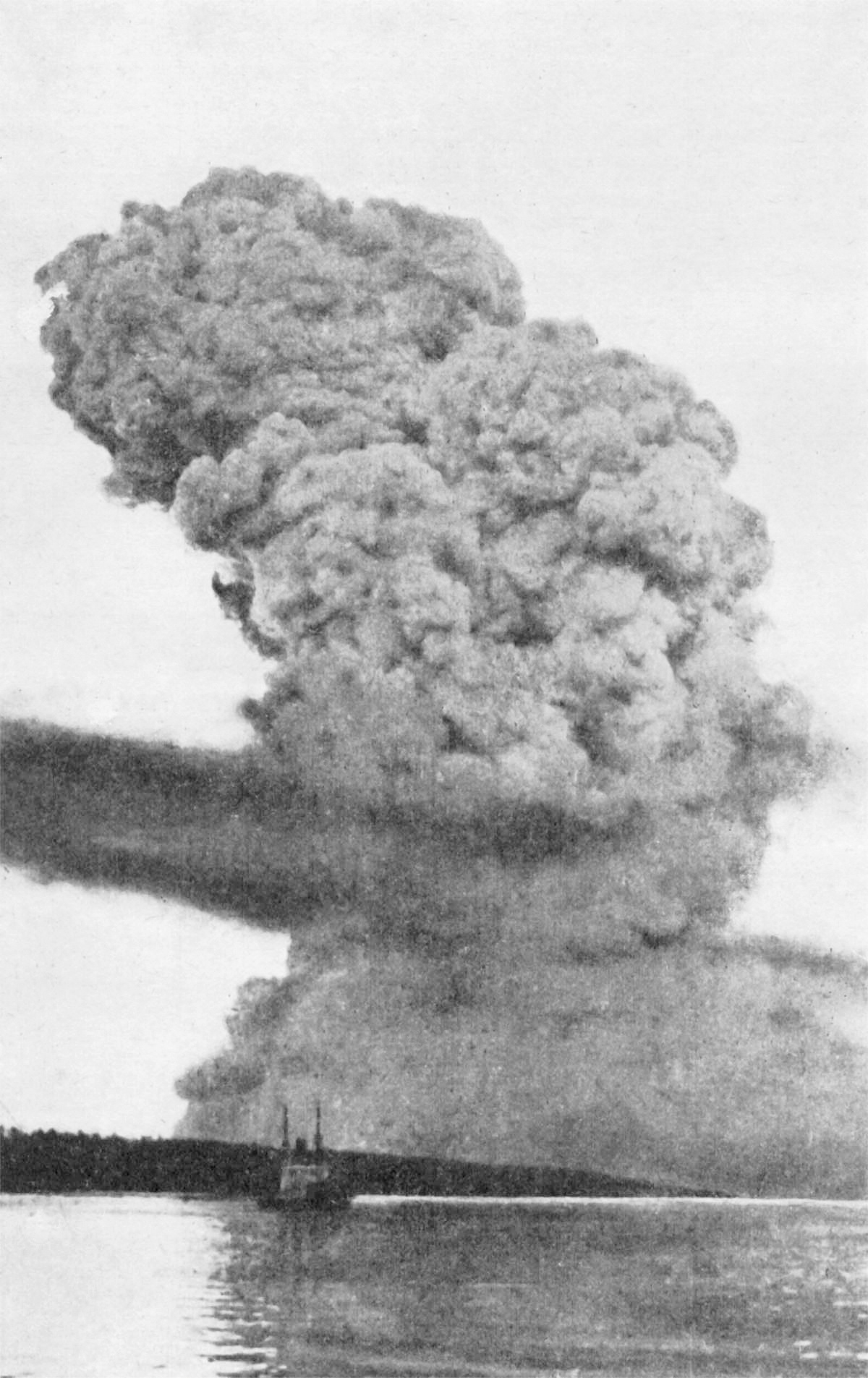
The aftermath of the collision

The collision occurred at 8:45 am. While the damage to Mont-Blanc was not severe, it toppled barrels that broke open and flooded the deck with benzol that quickly flowed into the hold. As Imo's engines kicked in, she quickly disengaged, which created sparks inside Mont-Blanc's hull. These ignited the vapours from the benzol. A fire started at the water line and travelled quickly up the side of the ship as the benzol spewed out from crushed drums on Mont-Blanc's decks. The fire quickly became uncontrollable. Surrounded by thick black smoke, and fearing she would explode almost immediately, the captain ordered the crew to abandon ship. A growing number of Halifax citizens gathered on the street or stood at the windows of their homes or businesses to watch the spectacular fire. The frantic crew of Mont-Blanc shouted from their two lifeboats to some of the other vessels that their ship was about to explode, but they could not be heard above the noise and confusion. As the lifeboats made their way across the harbour to the Dartmouth shore, the abandoned ship continued to drift and beached herself at Pier 6 near the foot of Richmond Street.

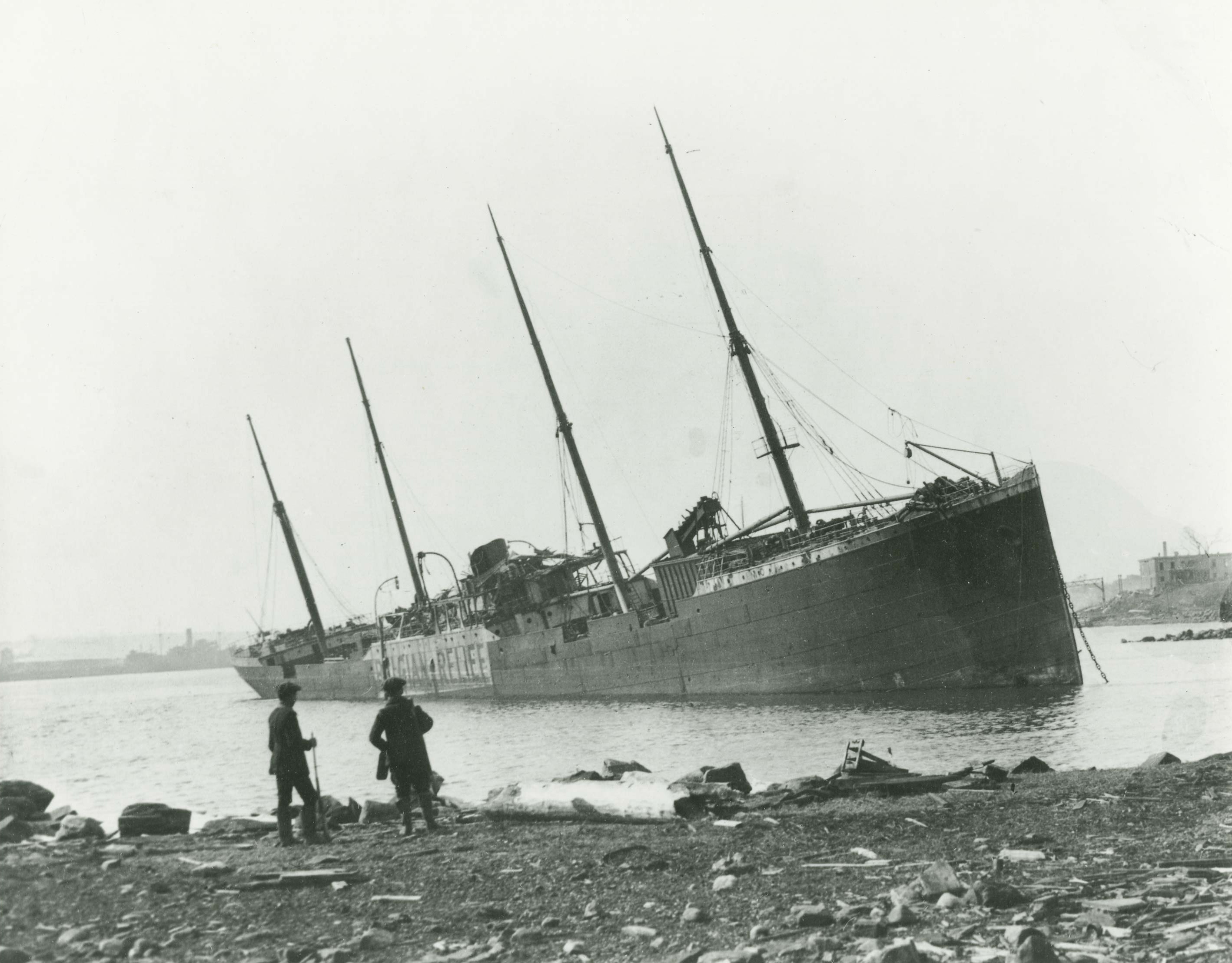
SS Imo aground on the Dartmouth side of the harbour after the explosion

At 9:04:35 am, the out-of-control fire aboard Mont-Blanc finally set off her highly explosive cargo, causing the Halifax Explosion. The ship was obliterated and a powerful blast wave radiated away from the explosion at more than 1,000 metres (3,300 ft) per second. A temperature of 5,000 °C (9,030 °F) and a pressure of thousands of atmospheres occurred at the centre of the explosion.

== Aftermath ==
All of the crew survived, except for one sailor who may have died of blood loss after being hit by debris from the blast, 20-year-old gunner Yves Quequiner. Casualties included about 2,000 known dead and some 9,000 injured. More than 1,600 houses were destroyed by the explosion, with another 12,000 damaged. The explosion blew the Mont-Blanc into shrapnel, which may have injured many people in the blast zone; about 250 people lost an eye to either the shrapnel or in-blown window glass shards, and 37 people were blinded. The blast was regarded as the largest man-made explosion disaster in history until Hiroshima.

A judicial inquiry known as the Wreck Commissioner's Inquiry was formed to investigate the causes of the collision. Proceedings began at the Halifax Court House on 13 December 1917, presided over by Justice Arthur Drysdale. The inquiry's report of 4 February 1918 blamed Mont-Blanc's captain Aimé Le Médec, the ship's pilot Francis Mackey, and Commander F. Evan Wyatt, the Royal Canadian Navy's chief examining officer in charge of the harbour, gates, and antisubmarine defences, for causing the collision. Drysdale agreed with Dominion Wreck Commissioner L.A. Demers' opinion that "it was the Mont-Blanc's responsibility alone to ensure that she avoided a collision at all costs" given her cargo; he was likely influenced by local opinion, which was strongly anti-French, as well as by the "street fighter" style of argumentation used by Imo lawyer Charles Burchell. According to Crown counsel W.A. Henry, this was "a great surprise to most people", who had expected the Imo to be blamed for being on the wrong side of the channel. All three men were charged with manslaughter and criminal negligence at a preliminary hearing heard by Stipendiary Magistrate Richard A. McLeod, and bound over for trial. Mackey's lawyer, Walter Joseph O'Hearn, asked a Nova Scotia Supreme Court justice, Benjamin Russell to issue a writ of habeas corpus. Russell agreed there was no justification for the charges and released the prisoner on 15 March 1918. As the captain had been arrested on the same warrant, he, too, was given a written discharge, though he had not spent any time in jail. Many people were most displeased with Russell's decision, including Attorney General Orlando Tiles Daniels. On 2 April, an attempt by prosecutor Andrew Cluney, on behalf of the attorney general's office to overturn the decision in the Nova Scotia Supreme Court (in banco) failed for lack of jurisdiction (as did two subsequent bids to indict Mackey on 9 April and 2 October 1918). Mr. O'Hearn pointed out the lack of jurisdiction from the outset of the proceedings. Four of the five justices, including Chief Justice Edward Robert Harris, agreed. Justice Arthur Drysdale was the lone dissenter. Ultimately, Justice Russell's decision was final. The case, In re Mackey, was added as a citation to the Criminal Code of Canada beginning in 1919 under Section 262 entitled, Manslaughter defined. Russell also presided over the Commander Wyatt's grand jury hearing (19–20 March 1918) and trial (17 April 1918). The trial proceedings took less than a day and ended with an acquittal on both charges.

In his autobiography, Russell reflected upon these particular proceedings. He stated: "Civium ardor prava jubentium gave me all that I could do in disposing of the cases with which I was bound to deal. One of these concerned the official in charge of the wiring across the mouth of the harbour. To suppose he had anything in the world to do with the disaster was an utterly lunatic notion. Yet, my impression is that the Grand Jury insisted on finding a true bill and placing him on trial. When the bill reached me, I got rid of it in the shortest and easiest way possible. It was simply nonsensical, and the fact a grand jury could find it was symptomatic of the condition of the common feeling."

Drysdale also oversaw the first civil-litigation trial, in which the owners of the two ships sought damages from each other. His decision (27 April 1918) found Mont-Blanc entirely at fault. Subsequent appeals to the Supreme Court of Canada (19 May 1919), and the Judicial Committee of the Privy Council in London (22 March 1920), determined Mont-Blanc and Imo were equally to blame for navigational errors that led to the collision.

== Remains of ship ==
Mont-Blanc was completely blown to pieces, and the remains of her hull were launched nearly 300 metres (1,000 ft) into the air. Steel fragments from her hull and fittings landed all over Halifax and Dartmouth, some traveling over four kilometres. Today, several large fragments, such as one of Mont-Blanc's guns, which landed 5.6 kilometres (3.5 miles) north of the blast site, and her anchor shank, which landed 3.2 kilometres (2 miles) south, are mounted where they landed as monuments to the explosion. Others are on display at the Maritime Museum of the Atlantic in Halifax, which has a large collection of Mont-Blanc fragments; many were recovered from the homes of survivors.

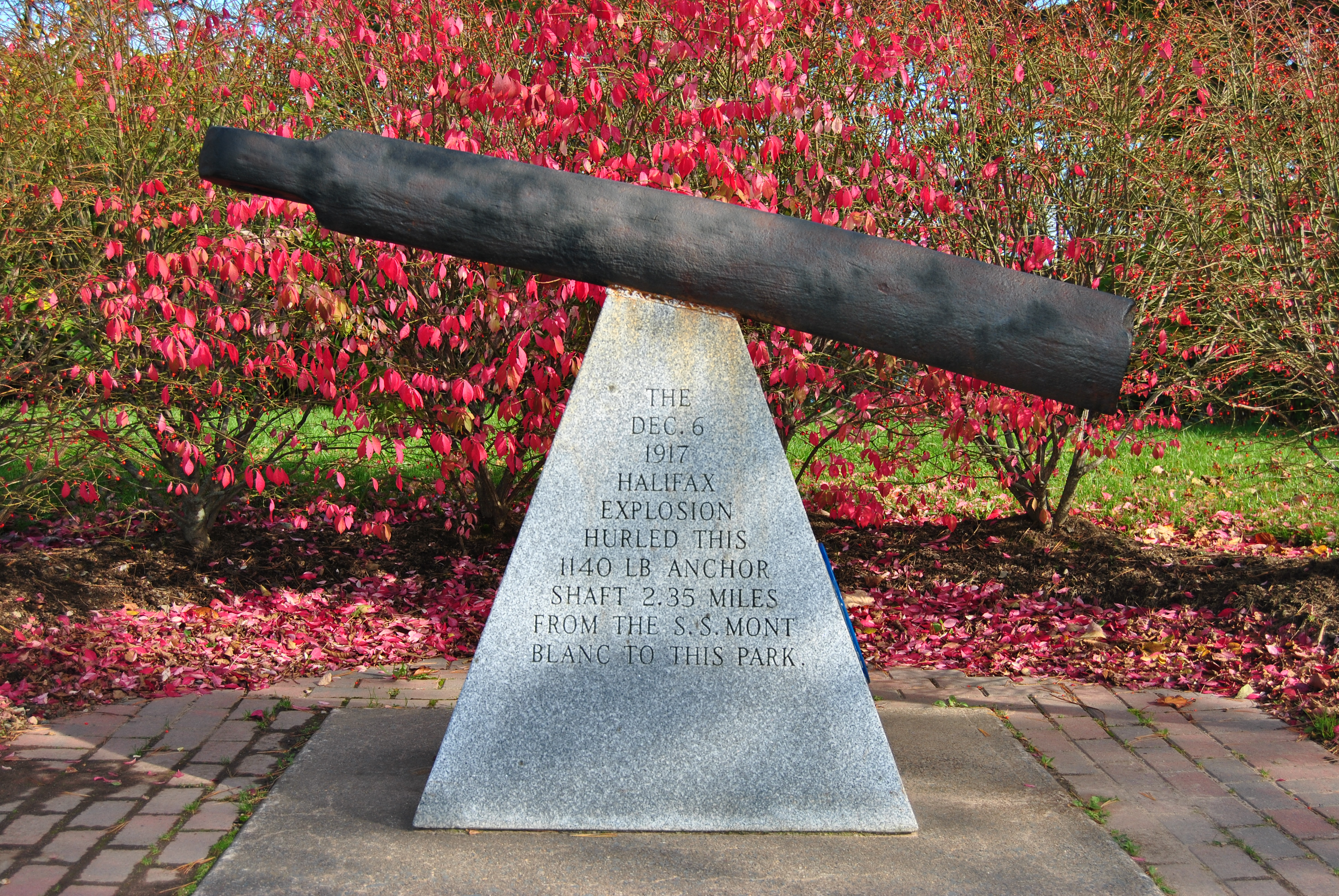
Mont Blanc Anchor Site 1

The wrecked remnants of one of Mont-Blanc's lifeboats were found washed ashore at the foot of Morris Street on 26 December 1917. Name boards from the boat were salvaged and collected by Harry Piers of the Nova Scotia Museum and are today part of the collection of the Maritime Museum of the Atlantic.

== See also ==
- Fort Stikine, the ship destroyed in the Bombay Explosion in World War II

== Bibliography ==
- Armstrong, John Griffith (2002). The Halifax Explosion and the Royal Canadian Navy. UBC Press. ISBN 978-0-7748-0891-0.
- Flemming, David (2004). Explosion in Halifax Harbour. Formac. ISBN 978-0-88780-632-2.
- Kitz, Janet (1989). Shattered City: The Halifax Explosion and the Road to Recovery. Nimbus Publishing. ISBN 978-0-921054-30-6.
- Kitz, Janet; Payzant, Joan (2006). December 1917: Revisiting the Halifax Explosion. Nimbus Publishing. ISBN 978-1-55109-566-0.
- Lloyd's Register of Shipping. Vol. I–Steamers. London: Lloyd's Register of Shipping. 1914.
- MacDonald, Laura (2005). Curse of the Narrows: The Halifax Explosion of 1917. HarperCollins. ISBN 978-0-00-200787-0.
- Ruffman, Alan; Howell, Colin D., eds. (1994). Ground Zero: A Reassessment of the 1917 Explosion in Halifax Harbour. Nimbus Publishing. ISBN 978-1-55109-095-5.
- Zemel, Joel (2014). Scapegoat, the extraordinary legal proceedings following the 1917 Halifax Explosion. New World Publishing. ISBN 978-1-895814-62-0.
