= SS Whangape =

Cargo ship

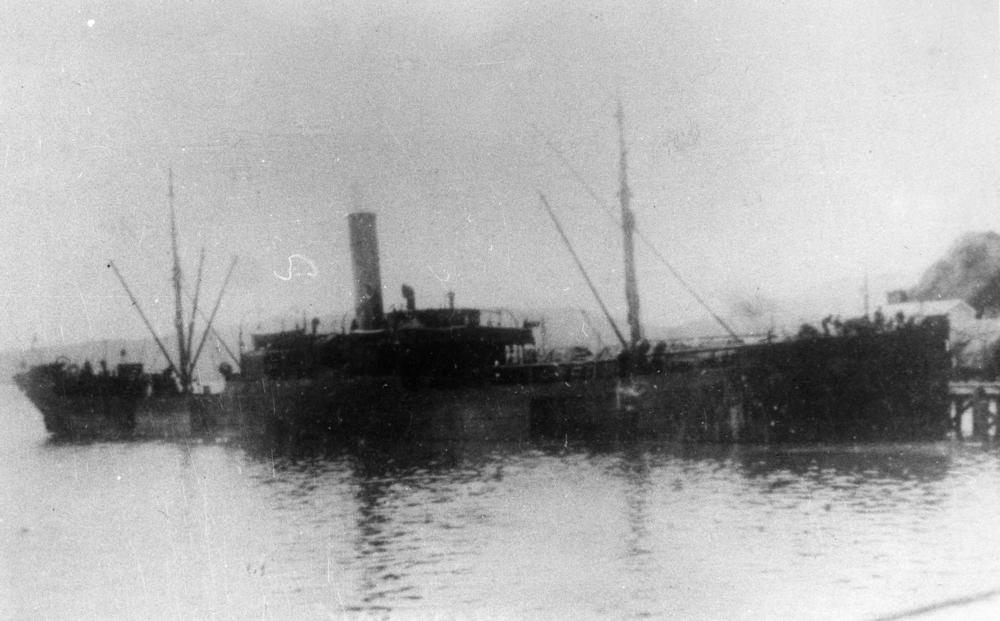
- SS Whangape

History
- Name: Whangape (1899–1928); Nanking (1928–1935)
- Owner: Union Steamship Company of New Zealand (1900–1928); Chun Young Zan (1928–1935)
- Builder: Sir Raylton Dixon & Co., Middlesbrough
- Yard number: 470
- Launched: 16 December 1899
- Completed: 1 March 1900
- Honours and awards: Battle honours: (RAN); Rabaul 1914
- Fate: Scrapped in 1935

General characteristics
- Type: Cargo ship
- Tonnage: 2,931 GRT
- Length: 320 ft (98 m)
- Beam: 44.8 ft (13.7 m)
- Depth: 15.3 ft (4.7 m)
- Installed power: Triple expansion steam engine

Whangape was a cargo ship measured at 2,931 gross register tons (GRT), built in 1899 by Sir Raylton Dixon & Co., Middlesbrough. The vessel was constructed for the British Maritime Trust as Adriana, sold while on the slips to Elder, Dempster & Company and renamed Asaba. Her engine was built by T Richardson & Sons, Hartlepool.

"Whangape" (pronounced: fun gah' pay) is a Māori word meaning "waiting for the inside of the pipi." The pipi is a bivalve mollusk native to New Zealand. Whangape was also the sister ship to SS Mont-Blanc, the munitions vessel under French registry that collided with the Norwegian vessel SS Imo on 6 December 1917 in Halifax Harbour, Nova Scotia, Canada resulting in the devastating Halifax Explosion. Plans used to build Mont-Blanc were slightly adjusted to build and launch Whangape as few months later.

The vessel was completed on 1 March 1900 and sold to the Union Steamship Company of New Zealand. After being chartered by the Royal Australian Navy, she took part in operations against the German colonies in the Pacific with the Australian Naval and Military Expeditionary Force (AN&MEF) during the First World War in 1914 and subsequently returned to her owners. Whangape was sold in 1928 to Chun Young Zan (Moller & Co) and renamed SS Nanking.

== Fate ==
Nanking was scrapped in China in 1935.
