= Cape Carysfort =

Headland on East Falkland, Falkland Islands

Coordinates: 51.4135°S 57.85356°W

Cape Carysfort is a headland in the north east of East Falkland between Macbride Head and Volunteer Point.

== Geography ==
Loch Head Pond, which is 4.8 kilometres (3 mi) long, is just behind the cape to the west. Water from Loch Head Pond enters the sea below Cape Carysfort into Cow Bay. Although Mullet are a marine fish, they have been found in Loch Head Pond.

== History ==
A shanty house was built at Cape Carysfort to cover the farming lease which extended to 2,400 hectares (6,000 acres). The house was later moved to the edge of Loch Head Pond, and it has since been vacated and has been donated to the museum at Port Stanley.

In 1921, Cape Carysfort was the site of the shipwreck of SS Guvernøren, a whale oil tanker which, under its former name SS Imo, had been involved in the massive 1917 explosion that caused severe damage to Halifax, Nova Scotia.

In August 1855, the British ship Carlton (or Carleton in some records) was carrying coal from Swansea to Panama when she was wrecked off Cape Carysfort. Her cargo was taken into Stanley by another ship and at least six of the crew from the Carlton then settled in the Falklands.

== Name ==
The Spanish name for the cape is Cabo Corrientes. The cape was named by John Byron in 1765 after one of the Lords of the Admiralty, Baron Carysford.

== Geology ==
Peat sampling in the 2020s, revealed tephra deposited by the Hudson Volcano eruption from as far back as 4200-3900 Before Present time. The sampling revealed that the peat at Cape Carysfort was 6 metres (20 ft) deep before bedrock was discovered, the deepest peat that was found in the six sampling sites.
