= HMHS Chantilly =

French and English passenger ship, built 1922

History

United Kingdom
- Name: Chantilly
- Namesake: Chantilly, Oise
- Owner: Compagnie des Française de Navigation à Vapeur Chargeurs Réunis (1922–23); Compagnie des Messageries Maritimes (1923–41); Ministry of War Transport (1941–45); Compagnie des Messageries Maritimes (1945–52)
- Operator: Compagnie des Messageries Maritimes (1923–41); Royal Navy (1941–45); Compagnie des Messageries Maritimes (1945–52)
- Port of registry: Marseille, France (1923–41); Liverpool, United Kingdom (1941–45); Marseille, France (1945–52)
- Builder: Ateliers & Chantiers de la Loire
- Launched: 14 March 1922
- Completed: January 1923
- Identification: Code Letters OVNE (1923–34); Code Letters FOAP (1934–41, 1945–52); Code Letters BFVS / Pennant Number 63 (1941–45)
- Fate: Sold for scrap, 1952

General characteristics
- Type: Passenger ship (1923–40, 1945–52); Troopship (1940–43); Hospital ship (1943–45)
- Tonnage: 9,986 GRT, 5,959 NRT
- Length: 145.82 metres (478 ft 5 in) (1922–34); 152.60 metres (500 ft 8 in) (1934–52)
- Beam: 18.03 metres (59 ft 2 in)
- Draught: 8.51 metres (27 ft 11 in)
- Depth: 8.31 metres (27 ft 3 in)
- Installed power: Steam turbine, 966NHP
- Speed: 13 knots (24 km/h)

HMHS Chantilly was a passenger ship that was built in 1922 by Ateliers & Chantiers de la Loire for the Compagnie des Française de Navigation à Vapeur Chargeurs Réunis. She was sold before completion to the Compagnie des Messageries Maritimes. Captured by the British in the Strait of Gibraltar in 1941, she served as a hospital ship but was severely damaged by the explosion of Fort Stikine at Bombay, India on 14 April 1944. Chantilly was repaired and returned to her owners post-war. She was scrapped in 1952.

== Description ==
As built, Chantilly was 145.82 metres (478 ft 5 in) long with a beam of 18.03 metres (59 ft 2 in). She had a depth of 8.31 metres (27 ft 3 in), and a draught of 8.51 metres (27 ft 11 in). Six steam turbines of 966NHP drove twin screw propellers via double reduction gearing. These could propel the ship at 13 knots (24 km/h). Chantilly was assessed at 9,986 GRT, 5,959 NRT.

== History ==
Chantilly was built by Ateliers & Chantiers de la Loire, Saint-Nazaire, Loire-Atlantique, France. She was ordered by Compagnie des Française de Navigation à Vapeur Chargeurs Réunis but was sold before completion to the Compagnie des Messageries Maritimes. Chantilly was launched on 14 March 1922 and completed in January 1923. Her port of registry was Marseille and the Code Letters OVNE were allocated.

On 28 September 1924, Chantilly arrived at Hong Kong carrying eighteen Breguet biplane aircraft. Nominally for reconnaissance, these were in fact armed with machine guns. She was diverted to Niuzhuang to deliver the aircraft before continuing to Shanghai. It was claimed that the delivery of the aircraft was contrary to an arms embargo that France was a signatory to (the Second Zhili–Fengtian War was taking place at the time, France was officially neutral). In 1934, her Code Letters were changed to FOAP. Also in that year, Chantilly was lengthened to 152.60 metres (500 ft 8 in).

Chantilly was in the Mediterranean Sea when war was declared. She arrived at Port Said, Egypt, on 25 September 1939. During the next eight months, she sailed the Mediterranean and east coast of Africa. She arrived at Gibraltar on 24 April 1940, departing the next day for Brest, France, from where she joined Convoy FP5 to Greenock, Renfrewshire, United Kingdom, arriving on 10 May. Chantilly was converted to a troopship. The work took less than a week and she departed for Bizerte, Algeria on 17 May. Chantilly again sailed the Mediterranean and also visited ports in north west Africa. She departed from Dakar, Senegal on 25 December 1940.

On 2 January 1941, she was captured off Oran, Algeria by HMS Duncan and Jaguar. She was found to be carrying rubber which was destined for Germany. Chantilly was taken in to Gibraltar. The passenger liner Chantilly, had 450 passengers; many of them were French Naval and Marine Officers with their wives. There was a lot of anti-British feeling aboard and as most of the French officers carried their sidearms a slight resistance was shown. The boarding party from the destroyer HMS Jaguar being obstructed fired a burst of machine-gun fire, which was directed into the water alongside the Chantilly. Ricochets killed 1 women passenger and a small girl, and wounded 5 others. She was placed under the ownership of the British Ministry of War Transport and was managed by the British-India Steam Navigation Company. Her port of registry was changed to Liverpool. The Code Letters BFVS were allocated. She was converted to a hospital ship and carried the pennant number 63. Chantilly departed from Gibraltar on 25 March as a member of Convoy HG 57, which arrived at Liverpool, Lancashire, United Kingdom on 11 April. She left the convoy at the Belfast Lough and subsequently arrived at Liverpool on 20 April. Little of her movements is known over the next seven months, except that she arrived at Berbera, Somalia on 4 June. She departed from Liverpool with Convoy OS 8 on 3 October, arriving at Freetown on 26 October. She then sailed to South Africa, arriving a Port Elizabeth on 20 December.

Chantilly departed from Port Elizabeth on 1 March 1942. She spent the next three month sailing the east coast of Africa, reaching Suez, Egypt, before returning to South Africa, arriving at Cape Town on 30 November. She sailed four days later for Saint Helena and Pernambuco, Brazil, where she arrived on 23 December.

Chantilly sailed on 31 December for Trinidad, arriving on 10 January 1943. Carrying troops, she then joined Convoy TAG 38 to Guantánamo Bay, Cuba and Convoy GN 38 to New York City, United States. She was a member of Convoy HX 228, which sailed from New York on 28 February and arrived at Liverpool on 15 March. Chantilly the sailed to Falmouth, Cornwall, arriving on 27 March. She was converted to a hospital ship. She departed from Falmouth on 2 November for Liverpool. She then joined Convoy OS 59KM, which departed on 16 November and split at sea on 28 November. Chantilly was in the portion that formed Convoy KMS 33G and arrived at Gibraltar on 29 November. She was carrying 810 troops bound for Algiers, which was reached as a member of Convoy KMS 33. During December 1943 and January 1944, she operated in Mediterranean waters, always under escort or in a convoy.

She departed from Algiers, Algeria on 24 January 1944 with Convoy GUS 28, which had sailed from Port Said on 15 January and arrived at the Hampton Roads, Virginia, United States on 15 February. She returned with Convoy UGS 30, arriving at Port Said on 10 February and sailing for Aden, where she arrived on 19 February. She then sailed with Convoy AB 32, which arrived at Bombay, India on 3 March. On 14 April, the Fort ship Fort Stikine caught fire and exploded, causing around 800 deaths and severely damaging the port and surrounding area. Chantilly was severely damaged.

Chantilly departed from Bombay on 20 August. She spent the next three months in Mediterranean and north west African waters, departing from Naples, Italy, on 26 October under escort for Southampton, Hampshire, United Kingdom, where she arrived on 9 November. She departed under escort on 23 November for an undisclosed location, returning to Southampton on 4 February 1945. She returned to Bombay in March 1945, sailing back to the Mediterranean and north west Africa. She was on a voyage from Freetown to Gibraltar when the war in Europe ended. Chantilly returned to the United Kingdom in June before sailing to Ceylon in August. She was at Cochin when the Second World War ended. Chantilly returned to the United Kingdom, arriving at Southampton on 25 September. On 19 November, she was returned to the Compagnie des Messageries Maritimes. She departed from Southampton on 30 November, arriving at Le Havre the next day. Chantilly served until 1952, when she was scrapped in Toulon.
