= SS Graciosa =

History
- Name: Greltoria; Rabymere; Edfou; Graciosa
- Owner: James C. Gould and Co. (1916–1917); Bromport Steamship Co. (1917–1923); Moss Steamship Co. (1923–1929); Skibs A/S Fjeld (1929–1944)
- Port of registry: (United Kingdom) Liverpool; (Norway) Drammen
- Builder: Clyde Shipbuilding and Engineering Co., Port Glasgow, Scotland
- Launched: 24 October 1916
- Completed: 2 February 1917
- Identification: Official number: 137533
- Fate: Badly damaged during the Bombay Docks Explosion, 14 April 1944, and subsequently scrapped

General characteristics
- Type: Freighter
- Tonnage: 1,776 gross register tons (GRT); 1,052 net register tons (NRT); 3,295 tons deadweight (DWT)
- Length: 265.2 ft (80.8 m)
- Beam: 43 ft 3 in (13.2 m)
- Draught: 19 ft 5 in (5.9 m)
- Installed power: 159 nhp; 1,150 ihp (860 kW)
- Propulsion: 1 screw propeller; 1 triple-expansion steam engine
- Speed: 8.5 or 10 knots (15.7 or 18.5 km/h; 9.8 or 11.5 mph)

SS Graciosa was a small freighter built during the First World War for James C. Gould and Co. under the name of Greltoria. Completed in 1917, she was sold while fitting out to the Bromport Steamship Company and renamed Rabymere for use on their West African routes. The ship was sold to the Moss Steamship Co. in 1923 when the Lever Brothers closed down Bromport and sold off its ships. Moss renamed the ship as Edfou before selling it to Skibs A/S Fjeld in 1929 who renamed it Graciosa. During the Second World War, the ship was badly damaged during the Bombay Docks Explosion in early 1944 and was declared a constructive total loss and subsequently scrapped.

== Description ==
Graciosa had an overall length of 265.2 feet (80.8 m), with a beam of 42 feet 3 inches (12.9 m) and a draught of 19 feet 5 inches (5.9 m). The ship was assessed at 1,776 gross register tons (GRT), 1,052 net register tons (NRT), and 3,295 tons deadweight (DWT). She had a vertical triple-expansion steam engine driving a single screw propeller, and the engine was rated at a total of 159 nominal horsepower and produced 1,150 indicated horsepower (860 kW). Sources differ about her maximum speed, quoting speeds of 8.5 knots (15.7 km/h; 9.8 mph) or 10 knots (19 km/h; 12 mph).

== Construction and career ==
Graciosa was laid down by the Clyde Shipbuilding and Engineering Co. at its shipyard in Port Glasgow, Scotland, launched on 24 October 1916. Ordered by James C. Gould and Co., the ship was sold to the Levers Brothers' newly formed Bromport Steamship Co. while fitting out. She was completed on 2 February 1917 and named Rabymere.

Graciosa was scrapped in Bombay (now Mumbai), British India, after having been declared a constructive total loss.

== Bibliography ==
- Fenton, Roy (December 2022). "Levers' Early Shipping Ventures: Bromport Steamship Co., Ltd. and its Predecessors". Marine News Supplement. 76 (12): S340 – S352. ISSN 0966-6958.
- Jordan, Roger W. (1999). The World's Merchant Fleets, 1939: The Particulars and Wartime Fates of 6,000 ships. London: Chatham Publishing. ISBN 1-86176-023-X.
- Rohwer, Jürgen (2005). Chronology of the War at Sea 1939–1945: The Naval History of World War Two (Third Revised ed.). Annapolis, Maryland: Naval Institute Press. ISBN 1-59114-119-2.
