= Bromport Steamship Company =

- Industry: Shipping
- Founded: Liverpool, England (1916)
- Defunct: 1923
- Fate: Wound up
- Headquarters: Liverpool, England
- Parent: Lever Brothers

The Bromport Steamship Company was a British shipping line in the early 20th century. It was established in 1916 by the Lever Brothers by purchasing the ships of the Watson Shipping Company to handle the company's shipping business with West Africa. It was wound up in 1923 at a loss as its ships were not competitive in the post-First World War market.

== Bibliography ==
- Fenton, Roy (December 2022). "Levers' Early Shipping Ventures: Bromport Steamship Co., Ltd. and its Predecessors". Marine News Supplement. 76 (12): S340–S352. ISSN 0966-6958.
- Dunn, Laurence & Heaton, P. M. (1994). Palm Line. Abergavenny, Wales: P.M. Heaton Publishing. ISBN 1-872006-01-9.
