= HMIS El Hind =

History

India
- Name: El Hind
- Namesake: El Hind
- Builder: Lithgows Limited
- Launched: 14 April 1938
- Commissioned: 1943
- Fate: Destroyed by fire 14 April 1944

General characteristics
- Type: Landing Ship, Infantry
- Tonnage: 5319 grt, 3225 nrt
- Length: 415 ft (126.5 m)
- Propulsion: IHP 3000 reciprocating engine; 2 boilers; 1 shaft
- Speed: 14 knots (26 km/h)

HMIS El Hind (F120) was a merchant ship that was requisitioned by the Royal Indian Navy (RIN) in 1943. She was commissioned, and served as a Landing Ship, Infantry (Large) during World War II. She was destroyed in a fire in 1944.

== History ==
HMIS El Hind was originally a merchant ship, built by Lithgows Limited in Scotland and completed in June 1938. She was requisitioned in 1943, and commissioned into the RIN for use in amphibious warfare as Landing Ship, Infantry.

On 14 April 1944, exactly 6 years after her launch, El Hind was destroyed in a fire at Victoria Dock, Bombay when the British merchant ship SS Fort Stikine carrying explosives and ammunition blew up.
