= List of Allied convoys during World War II by region =

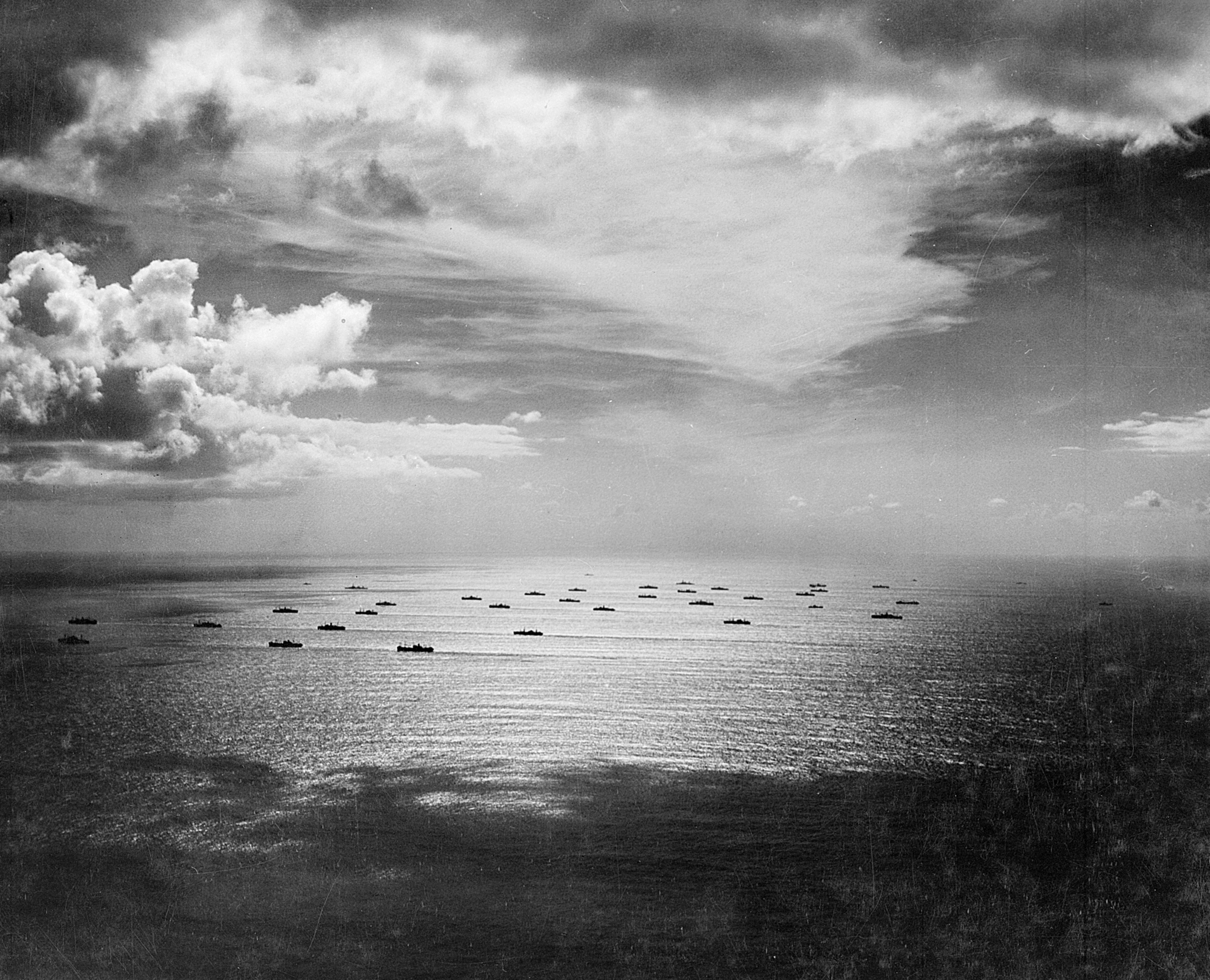
Aerial photo of a November 1942 UG convoy

This is a list of Allied convoys during World War II by region.

== European Coastal Atlantic convoys ==
European Coastal
Code	Route	First sailing	Last sailing	No. run	Notes
BB	Belfast or River Clyde to Bristol Channel	1940 Belfast, 1945 Clyde	1943 Belfast, 1945 Clyde		
BC	Bristol Channel to Bay of Biscay				outward and return convoys used same number
BD	White Sea to Dikson Island	September 1943			
BK	White Sea to Kola Inlet	Summer 1941			
BTC	Bristol Channel to River Thames	1944	1945	165	
CE	St. Helens Roads to Southend-on-Sea	1940	1944	261	
CW	Southend-on-Sea to St. Helens Roads	1940	1944	270	
DB	Dikson Island to White Sea	1942			
DF	River Clyde to Faroe Islands				military ferry service
DS	River Clyde to Reykjavík				military ferry service
EC	Southend-on-Sea to Oban via Firth of Forth	1941	1941	90	temporary substitution for EN convoys
EN	Methil, Fife to Oban via Loch Ewe	1940	1945	597	temporarily replaced by EC convoys during 1941
FD	Faroe Islands to River Clyde				military ferry
FN	River Thames to Firth of Forth	1939	1945	1,744	
FP	Brest via British Isles to Norway	April 1940	May 1940		French and Polish troop convoys
FS	Firth of Forth to River Thames	1939	1945		1,840
FS	Brest via British Isles to Norway	April 1940	May 1940		French supply convoys
GREYBACK	Dieppe, Seine-Maritime to Newhaven, East Sussex				ferry service
GS	Grimsby to Southend-on-Sea	1940	1940		
HM	Holyhead to Milford Haven				
HN	Bergen to Methil, Fife	1939	1940		
HXA	Western Approaches to English Channel	1939	1945		English channel section of same numbered HX convoys – no sailings from 1940 to 1944
KB	Kola Inlet to White Sea				
KP	Kola Inlet to Pechengsky District				
MH	Milford Haven to Holyhead				
MT	Methil, Fife to River Tyne				
NP	British Isles to Norway	April 1940	May 1940		troop convoys
OA	River Thames (or Methil, Fife after July 1940) to Liverpool	7 September 1939	24 October 1940	234	merged with OB convoy in the southwest approaches
OB	Liverpool to the Atlantic Ocean	7 September 1939	21 July 1941	345	merged with OA convoy in the southwest approaches - ON and OS convoys replaced OB convoys
ON	Methil, Fife to Bergen	1939	1940		
PW	Portsmouth to Wales				
SD	Iceland to River Clyde				military ferry service
SG	Southend-on-Sea to Grimsby	1940	1940		
SILVERTIP	Newhaven, East Sussex to Dieppe, Seine-Maritime				ferry service
TBC	River Thames to Bristol Channel	1944	1945		
TM	British Isles to Norway	April 1940	May 1940		troop convoys
TP	Norway to British Isles	May 1940	May 1940		troop convoys
UR	Loch Ewe (later Belfast) to Reykjavík				
WN	River Clyde, Oban and Loch Ewe to Firth of Forth				
WP	Wales to Portsmouth				

== North Atlantic convoys ==
Code prefix	Route	First sailing	Last sailing	Number of convoys	Notes
AT	United States to British Isles	March 1942	1945		troopships
BHX	Bermuda to Liverpool	May 1940	March 1941	97 (# 41-137)	sailed from Bermuda and merged with same number HX convoy at sea
CK	Charleston, South Carolina to British Isles	1944	1944		rarely used
CT	British Isles to Canada	1941	1941		troopships
CU	Caribbean (later New York City) to Liverpool	20 March 1943	30 May 1945	73	14-knot convoys of tankers with some fast cargo ships
GUF	Mediterranean to Chesapeake Bay	29 November 1942	16 April 1945	22	faster ships
GUS	Mediterranean to Chesapeake Bay	21 December 1942	27 May 1945	92	slower ships
HG	Gibraltar to Liverpool	26 September 1939	19 September 1942	89	replaced by MKS convoys after Operation Torch
HX	Halifax Harbour (later New York City) to Liverpool	16 Sept 1939	23 May 1945	377	9-knot convoys for ships of sustained speeds less than 15 knots
HXF	Halifax Harbour to Liverpool	29 Sept 1939	12 February 1940	17	fast sections of HX convoys
JW	Iceland to White Sea	25 December 1942	12 May 1945	17 (# 51-67)	replaced PQ convoys
KJ	Kingston, Jamaica to United Kingdom				
KMF	Firth of Clyde to Mediterranean	26 October 1942	23 May 1945	45	faster ships to the Mediterranean
KMS	Liverpool to Mediterranean	22 October 1942	27 April 1945	98	slower ships to the Mediterranean - 1st 12 sailed independently, remainder sailed with OS convoys and detached west of Gibraltar
MKF	Mediterranean to Firth of Clyde or Liverpool	12 November 1942	4 June 1945	45	faster ships from the Mediterranean
MKS	Mediterranean to Liverpool	12 November 1942	25 May 1945	103	slower ships from the Mediterranean- 1st 11 sailed independently, remainder merged with SL convoys west of Gibraltar
NA	Canada to British Isles				troopships
OG	Liverpool to Gibraltar	2 October 1939	17 October 1943	95	early sailings every 5th merged OA/OB convoy became an OG convoy at sea - later OG convoys sailed from Liverpool
ON	Liverpool to Halifax Harbour	26 July 1941	27 May 1945	307	replaced OB convoys for North American destinations - alternate convoys included slower ships until the ONS convoys started
ONS	Liverpool to Halifax Harbour	15 March 1943	21 May 1945	51	slower ships westbound on the ON convoy route
OS	Liverpool to Sierra Leone	24 July 1941	27 May 1945	131	replaced OB convoys for non-North American destinations - included KMS convoys detached west of Gibraltar
PQ	Iceland to White Sea	29 September 1941	2 September 1942	18	replaced by JW convoys
QP	White Sea to Iceland	28 September 1941	17 November 1942	15	replaced by RA convoys
RA	White Sea to Scotland	30 December 1942	23 May 1945	17 (# 51-67)	replaced QP convoys
RB	United States to British Isles	September 1942	September 1942	1	small passenger steamers
SC	Sydney, Nova Scotia (or Halifax Harbour or New York City) to Liverpool	15 August 1940	26 May 1945	177	7-knot convoys of eastbound ships too slow for the 9-knot HX convoys
SL	Sierra Leone to Liverpool	14 September 1939	25 November 1944	178	merged with MKS convoys west of Gibraltar
TA	British Isles to United States				large troopships
TC	Canada to British Isles	1939	1941		troopships carrying Canadian troops
TCU	Caribbean (later New York City) to Liverpool				14-knot CU convoys of tankers and fast cargo ships with troopships
TU	British Isles to United States	1943	1944		troopships
TUC	Liverpool to Caribbean (later New York City)				14-knot UC convoys of tankers and fast cargo ships with some troopships
UC	Liverpool to Caribbean (later New York City)	15 February 1943	3 June 1945	71	14-knot convoys of tankers with some fast cargo ships
UGF	Chesapeake Bay to Mediterranean	24 October 1942	8 April 1945	22	faster ships - (UGF-1) was the invasion force for Operation Torch
UGS	Chesapeake Bay to Mediterranean	13 November 1942	28 May 1945	95	slower ships
UT	United States to British Isles	1943	1944		troopships

== North American coastal and Caribbean convoys ==
Code prefix	Route	First sailing	Last sailing	Number of convoys	Notes
AH	Aruba to Halifax Harbour	July 1942	September 1942		a brief tanker series
ARG	Boston to Argentia, Newfoundland				USN convoys
AW	Aruba to Curaçao				local tanker traffic
BS	Corner Brook, Newfoundland to Sydney, Nova Scotia				a brief series
BW	Sydney, Nova Scotia to St. John's, Newfoundland	1942			
BX	Boston to Halifax Harbour	21 March 1942	22 May 1945		
CK	Havana, Cuba to Key West, Florida				
CL	St. John's, Newfoundland to Sydney, Nova Scotia				
CP	Curaçao to Panama Canal	1942	1942		
CW	Panama Canal to Key West, Florida				
CZ	Curaçao to Panama Canal				
FH	Saint John, New Brunswick to Halifax Harbour	late 1942			
G	Guantanamo Bay Naval Base to Puerto Rico				
GAT	Guantanamo Bay Naval Base to Trinidad via Aruba				
GJ	Guantanamo Bay Naval Base to Kingston, Jamaica				
GK	Guantanamo Bay Naval Base to Key West, Florida				
GM	Galveston, Texas to Mississippi River				
GN	Guantanamo Bay Naval Base to New York City				
GP	Guantanamo Bay Naval Base to Panama Canal				
GS	Greenland to Sydney, Nova Scotia, or St. John's, Newfoundland				USN escorted convoys
GZ	Guantanamo Bay Naval Base to Panama Canal	1942			
HA	Halifax Harbour to Curaçao	1942	September 1942		replaced HT convoys
HF	Halifax Harbour to Saint John, New Brunswick				
HHX	Halifax Harbour to meet HX convoys originating in New York City at the Halifax Ocean Meeting Point (HOMP)				
HJ	Halifax Harbour to St. John's, Newfoundland				
HK	Houston, Texas to Key West, Florida				
HON	Halifax Harbour to ON convoys at the Halifax Ocean Meeting Point (HOMP)				
HS	Halifax Harbour to Sydney, Nova Scotia				
HT	Halifax Harbour to Trinidad	May 1942	1942		replaced by HA convoys
JG	Kingston, Jamaica to Guantanamo Bay Naval Base				
JH	St. John's, Newfoundland to Halifax Harbour				
JN	St. John's, Newfoundland to Labrador				
KG	Key West, Florida to Guantanamo Bay Naval Base				
KH	Key West, Florida to Houston, Texas				
KN	Key West, Florida to New York City				
KP	Key West, Florida to Mississippi River				
KS	New York City to Key West, Florida				
KW	Key West, Florida to Havana, Cuba				
LC	Sydney, Nova Scotia to St. John's, Newfoundland				
LN	St. Lawrence River to Labrador				
MG	Mississippi River to Galveston, Texas				
NG	New York City to Guantanamo Bay Naval Base				
NJ	Newfoundland (island) coast to St. John's, Newfoundland				
NK	New York City to Key West, Florida				
NL	Labrador to St. Lawrence River				
PG	Panama Canal to Guantanamo Bay Naval Base	1942	1942		
PK	Pilottown, Louisiana to Key West, Florida				
QS	Quebec to Sydney, Nova Scotia				
SB	Sydney, Nova Scotia to Corner Brook, Newfoundland	1942			
SG	Sydney, Nova Scotia (later St. John's, Newfoundland) to Greenland	1942	1942		USN escorted convoys
SH	Sydney, Nova Scotia to Halifax Harbour				
SHX	Sydney, Nova Scotia to HX convoys				
SJ	San Juan, Puerto Rico to Guantanamo Bay Naval Base				
SQ	Sydney, Nova Scotia to Quebec				
TAG	Trinidad to Guantanamo Bay Naval Base via Aruba	1942			
TAW	Trinidad to Key West via Curaçao	1942	1942		
TG	Trinidad to Guantanamo Bay Naval Base				
TH	Trinidad to Halifax Harbour	1942	1942		
TO	Trinidad to Curaçao				
WA	Curaçao to Aruba				
WAT	Key West to Trinidad via Curaçao				
WS	Wabana, Newfoundland and Labrador to Sydney, Nova Scotia				
XB	Halifax Harbour to Boston	18 March 1942			
ZC	Panama Canal to Curaçao				
ZG	Panama Canal to Guantanamo Bay Naval Base				

== Mediterranean and North African coastal convoys ==
Code prefix	Route	First sailing	Last sailing	Number of convoys	Notes
AC	Alexandria to Tobruk	1941	1941		
AG	Alexandria to Greece	1941	1941		
AH	Augusta, Sicily to heel of Italy	September 1943			
AN	Alexandria to Piraeus	1940	1941		
AP	British Isles to Egypt	summer 1940	summer 1940		troopships
ARM	local Mediterranean				little used
AS	Piraeus to Alexandria	1940	1941		
AT	Alexandria to Tobruk	late 1941			
Blue	Port Said to Gibraltar	1939	1939		
BS	Brest, France to Casablanca	September 1939	June 1940		French convoys
CG	Casablanca to Gibraltar				
CNF	convoys for Allied invasion of Sicily				special designation
CRD	Casablanca to Dakar				
CT	Corsica to Bizerte via Sardinia	1944	1944		
CV	Tobruk to Malta	1944	1944		rarely used
D	Dakar to Casablanca				
DR	Dakar to Gibraltar	1944	1944		
DRC	Dakar to Casablanca				
ET	North Africa to Gibraltar	November 1942	early 1943		
GC	Gibraltar to Casablanca				
GM	Gibraltar to Malta				
Green	Gibraltar to Port Said	late 1939	late 1939		
GTX	Gibraltar to Alexandria via Tripoli	1943	1943		
GUF	Oran or Naples to Chesapeake Bay				faster ships
GUS	Port Said to Chesapeake Bay				slower ships
HA	heel of Italy to Augusta, Sicily	1943			
HP	heel of Italy to Piraeus				
IXF	Taranto and Naples to Alexandria and Port Said				
K	Casablanca to Brest, France				French convoys - sometimes prefixed F or S
KS	Casablanca to Brest, France				French convoys
LE	Port Said to Haifa				
LW	Haifa to Port Said				
ME	Malta to Alexandria and Port Said				
MO	Marseille to North Africa				
Ms	Marseille to Naples	1944	1945		
MW	Alexandria to Malta				
NCF	fast convoys for Allied invasion of Sicily	1943	1943		
NCS	slow convoys for Allied invasion of Sicily	1943	1943		
NP	Turkey to Port Said				
NSF	North Africa to Naples				troopships
NV	Naples to Augusta, Sicily				
OM	Oran to Marseille	1944	1944		
PH	Piraeus to heel of Italy				
PN	Port Said to Turkey				
PR	Piraeus to Dardanelles	1945	1945		
Red	Gibraltar to far east	1939	1940		
PR	Dardanelles to Piraeus	1945	1945		
SBF	assault convoys for Allied invasion of Sicily	1943	1943		
SBM	assault convoys for Allied invasion of Sicily	1943	1943		
SM	Naples to Marseille				
SNF	Naples to North Africa				fast troopships
SR	Freetown to Gibraltar	1943	1944		
TA	Tobruk to Alexandria				
TC	Tunisia to Corsica	1943	1944		
TE	Gibraltar to North Africa	1943	1943		
TJF	assault convoys for Allied invasion of Sicily	1943	1943		
TJM	assault convoys for Allied invasion of Sicily	1943	1943		
TJS	assault convoys for Allied invasion of Sicily	1943	1943		
TSF	assault convoys for Naples landings				
TSM	assault convoys for Naples landings				
TSS	assault convoys for Naples landings				
TV	Tripoli to Malta				
TX	Tripoli to Alexandria				
UGF	Chesapeake Bay to Gibraltar (later Naples)	November 1942	May 1945		faster ships (UGF 1 was the Operation Torch invasion convoy)
UGS	Chesapeake Bay to Gibraltar (later Port Said)	November 1942	May 1945		slower ships
VC	Malta to Tobruk				
VN	Augusta, Sicily or Malta to Naples (OR) Naples to Livorno				
VT	Malta to Tripoli				
WX	western desert ports to Alexandria				
XIF	Alexandria and Port Said to Taranto and Naples				
XT	Alexandria to Tripoli				
XTG	Alexandria to Gibraltar via Tripoli	1943	1943		
XW	Alexandria to western desert ports				

== South Atlantic convoys ==
Code prefix	South Atlantic routes	First sailing	Last sailing	Number of convoys	Notes
AS	United States to Suez Canal	1942	1942		via Freetown
BF	Bahia to Freetown	1943			USN escorts
BRN	Bahia to Recife northward	late 1942			
BT	Bahia to Trinidad	November 1942	July 1943		
CF	Cape Town to British Isles via west Africa				little used
CN	Cape Town northward to dispersal				
DBF	Dakar to Freetown via Bathurst (Banjul) Gambia	1943	1943		
DSF	Dakar to Freetown				
DSL	Dakar to Freetown and Lagos				
DSP	Dakar to Freetown and Pointe-Noire				
DST	Dakar to Freetown and Sekondi-Takoradi				
E	Trinidad to dispersal southward				
FB	Freetown to Bahia				
FFT	Freetown to Trinidad	1942	1943		
FJ	Florianópolis to Rio de Janeiro				
FSD	Freetown to Dakar	1944	1944		small craft
JF	Rio de Janeiro to Florianópolis				
JR	Rio de Janeiro to Recife				
JT	Rio de Janeiro to Trinidad	1943	1945		
LGE	Lagos eastbound				local west African traffic
LGW	Lagos westbound				local west African traffic
LM	Lagos to Matadi				
LS	Lagos to Freetown				
LSD	Lagos to Dakar via Freetown				
LTS	Lagos to Freetown via Sekondi-Takoradi				
NC	Walvis Bay to Cape Town				
OSS	Freetown southward				southward extension of the corresponding OS convoy
OT	Trinidad to North Africa				
PGE	Pointe-Noire southward				local traffic
PAD	Pointe-Noire to Dakar via Freetown				
PT	Paramaribo to Trinidad				
PTS	Pointe-Noire to Freetown via Sekondi-Takoradi				
RJ	Recife to Rio de Janeiro				
RT	Cape Town to Freetown (OR) Recife to Trinidad	1941 (African) 1943 (South American)	1941		
SJ	Santos, São Paulo to Rio de Janeiro				
ST	Freetown to Sekondi-Takoradi				
STC	Freetown to Cape Town via Sekondi-Takoradi				
STL	Freetown to Lagos via Sekondi-Takoradi				
STP	Freetown to Pointe-Noire via Sekondi-Takoradi				
STW	Freetown to Walvis Bay via Sekondi-Takoradi				
TB	Trinidad to Bahia				
TF	Trinidad to Freetown				
TGE	Sekondi-Takoradi and Lagos eastward to dispersal				
TJ	Trinidad to Rio de Janeiro				
TLDM	Sekondi-Takoradi to Matadi via Lagos and Douala				
TO	North Africa to Caribbean				
TP	Trinidad to Paramaribo				
TR	Trinidad to Recife				
TRINIDAD	Trinidad to dispersal southeast				
TS	Sekondi-Takoradi to Freetown				
TSD	Sekondi-Takoradi to Dakar via Freetown				
TV	Trinidad eastward to dispersal				
WTS	Walvis Bay to Freetown via Sekondi-Takoradi				

== Indian Ocean convoys ==
Code Prefix	Indian Ocean routes	First sailing	Last sailing	Number of convoys	Notes
AB	Aden to Mumbai	November 1942			
ABF	Aden to Mumbai				fast troopship convoys
AJ	Aden to Colombo				
AK	Aden to Kilindini Harbour				
AKD	Aden to Durban via Kilindini Harbour	September 1943			
AM	Chittagong to Chennai				
AP	Aden to Persian Gulf	Late 1942			
AS	United States to Suez Canal	March 1942			via Freetown
BA	Mumbai to Aden	May 1941	November 1942		
BAF	Mumbai to Aden				fast troopships
BC	Beira, Mozambique to Durban (OR) Mumbai to Colombo	July 1942 from Beira - September 1943 from Mumbai	September 1942 from Beira		
BK	Mumbai to Karachi	1943	1943		little used
BM	Mumbai to Singapore (or Colombo after January 1942)				
BN	Mumbai to Suez Canal	1940	1941		
BP	Mumbai to Persian Gulf				
BS	Suez Canal to Aden	1940	1941		
C	Colombo to dispersal	1942	1942		
CA	Cape Town southward to dispersal				
CB	Durban to Beira, Mozambique				
CD	Cape Town to Durban				
CF	Colombo to Fremantle, Western Australia				occasional use
CH	Chittagong to Kolkata				
CJ	Kolkata to Colombo				
CM	Cape Town to Aden				military convoys via Kilindini Harbour
CX	Colombo to Addu Atoll				{return Addu Atoll to Colombo convoys used same CX designation}
DC	Durban to Cape Town				
DK	Durban to Kilindini Harbour				
DKA	Durban to Aden via Kilindini Harbour				
DLM	Durban to Maputo				
DM	Durban to Malaya	1941	1942	3	
DN	Durban northwards to dispersal				
HB	Australia to India	1945	1945		troopships
HC	Kolkata to Chittagong				
JA	Colombo to Aden				
JC	Colombo to Kolkata				
JM	India to Madagascar via Kilindini Harbour	1943	1943		
JMG	assault convoy to Malaya	September 1945		1	
JS	Colombo to Singapore	November 1941	February 1942		
KA	Kilindini Harbour to Aden				
KB	Karachi to Mumbai				
KD	Kilindini Harbour to Durban				
KM	Kilindini Harbour to Madagascar				
KP	Karachi to Persian Gulf				
KR	Kolkata and Rakhine State ports to Yangon	1945	1945		
LMD	Maputo to Durban				
MA	Kilindini Harbour to Aden				
MC	Aden to Cape Town via Kilindini Harbour and Durban				
MD	Madagascar to Durban			1	
MK	Madagascar to Kilindini Harbour				
MN	Mauritius to Seychelles				
MR	Chennai to Yangon				
OW	Australia to India				
PA	Persian Gulf to Aden				
PB	Persian Gulf to Mumbai				
RK	Colombo to Kilindini Harbour (OR) Yangon to Kolkata via Rakhine State	1944 from Colombo, 1945 from Rangoon	1944 from Colombo, 1945 from Rangoon		
RM	Yangon to Colombo via Chennai				
SD	Seychelles to Madagascar				
SJ	Singapore to Colombo	November 1941	February 1942		
SM	Jakarta to Fremantle, Western Australia				
SR	Kolkata to Yangon	1941	1942		
SU	Suez Canal to Australia	1940	1941		
SW	Suez Canal to Kilindini Harbour or Durban	1940	1941		
US	Australia to Suez Canal				
WO	India to Australia				troopships
WS	British Isles to Suez Canal and Mumbai				troopships; WS convoys on at least one occasion [WS30, 1943] routed via Freetown and Durban

== Pacific convoys ==
Code prefix	Pacific routes	First sailing	Last sailing	Number of convoys	Notes
AN	Admiralty Islands to New Guinea				
BG	Milne Bay to New Guinea (OR) Brisbane to Gladstone, Queensland				
BN	New Britain to New Guinea				
BT	Sydney to United States (OR) Brisbane to Townsville, Queensland	1943 (Sydney to US)	1944 (Sydney to US)		Sydney to US were troop convoys
BV	Brisbane to Townsville, Queensland				
CO	Newcastle, New South Wales to Melbourne and Adelaide	1942	1942		
DG	Thursday Island, Queensland to Merauke				
DT	Darwin, Northern Territory to Thursday Island, Queensland				
FM	Milne Bay to Port Moresby				
GB	New Guinea to Milne Bay				
GD	Merauke to Thursday Island, Queensland				
GF	Adelaide to Fremantle, Western Australia				
GI	New Guinea to Philippines				
GP	Sydney to Townsville, Queensland and Brisbane				
GT	Gladstone, Queensland to Townsville, Queensland				
IG	Philippines to New Guinea				
LQ	Great Barrier Reef to Brisbane				
MB	Port Moresby to `Fall River` Milne Bay				
MF	Port Moresby to Milne Bay `Fall River`				
MS	Melbourne to Singapore	November 1941	February 1942		
MT	Port Moresby to Townsville, Queensland	1942	1942		
MV	Milne Bay to Townsville, Queensland				
NA	Langemak Bay to Admiralty Islands				
NB	New Guinea to New Britain				
NE	New Zealand to Panama Canal				
NLY	Lingayen Gulf – Jayapura – Leyte				
NS	New Caledonia to Sydney				
NT	New Guinea to Townsville, Queensland				
OC	Melbourne to Newcastle, New South Wales				
PG	Brisbane to Sydney				
PQ	Townsville, Queensland to Port Moresby	1942	1942		
PT	Pearl Harbor to Tarawa				
PV	Melbourne to Townsville, Queensland				
QL	Brisbane to Townsville, Queensland				
SN	Sydney to New Caledonia				
ST	Sydney to Townsville, Queensland				
SV	Sydney to Townsville, Queensland				
T	Hollandia to Manila				
TD	Thursday Island, Queensland to Darwin, Northern Territory				
TD	New Zealand to northern Australia				
TN	Townsville, Queensland to New Guinea				
TP	Tarawa to Pearl Harbor				
TS	Townsville, Queensland to Sydney and Brisbane				
VB	Townsville, Queensland to Brisbane				
VK	Sydney to Wellington				
VS	Townsville, Queensland to Sydney				
ZT	New Zealand to Sydney				

== Normandy invasion convoys ==
Code prefix	Normandy invasion convoys	First sailing	Last sailing	Number of convoys	Notes
ATM	Antwerp to River Thames	late 1944	1945		
BEC	Bristol Channel to France	June 1944	October 1944		
COC	Plymouth to Brittany	late 1944	early 1945		
EBC	Bristol Channel to France	June 1944	October 1944		
EBM	Bristol Channel to France	June 1944	June 1944	1	motor transport convoy
ECM	Falmouth, Cornwall to France	June 1944	early July 1944		
ECP	Portland Harbour and Solent to Baie de la Seine	June 1944	October 1944		personnel convoys
EMM	Belfast to France	June 1944	July 1944	2	
EMP	Belfast to France	July 1944	July 1944	2	
EPM	Portland Harbour to France via Solent	July 1944	September 1944		motor transport convoys
EPP	Portland Harbour to France via Solent	July 1944	September 1944		personnel convoys
ETC	River Thames to France	June 1944	October 1944		
ETM	River Thames to France	June 1944	October 1944		motor transport convoys
EWC	Spithead to Normandy	June 1944	June 1944		
EWL	Isle of Wight to France	June 1944	June 1944		mainly landings ships and landing craft
EWM	Isle of Wight to France	September 1944	October 1944		motor transport convoys
EWP	Isle of Wight to France				personnel convoys
EXP		June 1944	October 1944		invasion convoys
FBC	Baie de la Seine to Bristol Channel	June 1944	October 1944		
FC	France to western England	June 1944	July 1944		
FCP	France to western England	June 1944	July 1944		personnel convoys
FPM	France to Portland Harbour				motor transport convoys
FPP	France to Portland Harbour	July 1944	August 1944		personnel convoys
FTC	France to River Thames	1944	1944		
FTM	France to River Thames	1944	1944		motor transport convoys
FWC	France to Isle of Wight	June 1944			
FWL	France to Isle of Wight	1944	1944		landing craft convoys
FWM	France to Isle of Wight	June 1944	July 1944		motor transport convoys
FWP	France to Isle of Wight	June 1944	September 1944		personnel convoys
FXP	France to British Isles	June 1944	October 1944		
LU	Humber to Elbe	May 1945	May 1945		
MTC	Baie de la Seine to Southend-on-Sea				replaced FTC
MTM	Baie de la Seine to Southend-on-Sea				replaced FTM
NAP	Dover to France	December 1944	December 1944		
NR	Norway to Methil, Fife	1945	1945		
RN	Methil, Fife to Norway	May 1945	May 1945		
TAC	River Thames to Ostend	1945	1945		
TACA	River Thames to Antwerp				replaced by TAM
TAM	River Thames to Antwerp				replaced TACA
TAP	River Thames to France	1945	1945		
TMC	River Thames to France	June 1944	October 1944		
TMM	River Thames to France	June 1944	October 1944		motor transport convoys
UL	Elbe to Humber	May 1945	May 1945		
WAP		June 1944	October 1944		invasion convoys
WDC		September 1944	December 1944		invasion convoys
WEC	Isle of Wight to France	December 1944	May 1945		
WEL	Isle of Wight to France	1944	1945		landing craft
WEP	Isle of Wight to Cherbourg-Octeville	December 1944	December 1944		
WFM		October 1944	November 1944		invasion convoys
WMP	Isle of Wight to Arromanches-les-Bains	November 1944	December 1944		
WNC	Isle of Wight to Le Havre	December 1944	May 1945		
WNL	Isle of Wight to France	April 1945	May 1945		
WVP	Isle of Wight to France	December 1944	May 1945		

== Bibliography ==
- Hague, Arnold (2000a). The Allied Convoy System 1939–1945: Its Organisation, Defence and Operation. London: Chatham. ISBN 1-86176-147-3.
