= SS Empire Metal =

SS Empire Metal was the name of two steamships in the service of the British Government.

- SS Empire Metal (1941), built by Furness Shipbuilding Company, and launched as Empire Metal in 1941. She was transferred to the Royal Fleet Auxiliary and completed as RFA Eaglesdale (A104), a Dale-class fleet tanker.
- SS Empire Metal (1942), built by Harland & Wolff. Sunk at Bône, Algeria on 2 January 1943.
