= Convoy TAG 19 =

Convoy TAG.19
- Part of World War II
Date	6–11 November 1942
Location	Lesser Antilles, Caribbean Sea
Result	German tactical victory

Belligerents
(Nazi Germany) Germany	Netherlands; Norway; Panama; United Kingdom; United States

Commanders and leaders
Admiral Karl Dönitz; Kapitänleutnant Georg Staats	

Strength
1 U-boat	31 merchant ships 14 escorts

Casualties and losses
	2 ships sunk

Convoy TAG 19 was a trade convoy of merchant ships during the second World War. It was the 19th of the numbered TAG Convoys from Trinidad and Aruba to Guantánamo. The convoy was found on the night of 5–6 November 1942 by U-508. Kapitänleutnant Georg Staats (Knight's Cross) sank two ships from the convoy on 7 November in two approaches aboard U-508.

== Ships in the convoy ==
Name	Flag	Tonnage (GRT)	Notes
Afghanistan (1940)	United Kingdom	6,992	
Alar (1939)	Norway	9,430	
Baalbeck (1937)	Norway	2,160	
Baldbutte (1919)	United States	6,295	Curaçao to Guantanamo Bay Naval Base
Baron Maclay (1924)	United Kingdom	6,317	
Britamsea (1939)	Norway	8,238	
Courageous (1918)	United States	7,573	
Dunboyne (1919)	United States	3,515	Did not sail
Empire Airman II (1942)	United Kingdom	9,813	Aruba to Guantanamo Bay Naval Base
Empire Metal (1942)	Royal Navy	8,201	Curaçao to Guantanamo Bay Naval Base
Empire Wordsworth (1942)	United Kingdom	9,891	Curaçao to Guantanamo Bay Naval Base
Fenja (1939)	Norway	8,268	
Geo W Mcknight (1933)	United Kingdom	12,502	Aruba to Guantanamo Bay Naval Base
Gulfking (1921)	United States	6,561	Curaçao to Guantanamo Bay Naval Base
Hanley (1920)	United States	7,583	
Lindenhall (1937)	United Kingdom	5,248	Sunk by U-508
Lord Cochrane (1934)	United Kingdom	4,157	
Nathaniel Hawthorne (1942)	United States	7,176	Sunk by U-508
Ocean Peace (1942)	United Kingdom	7,173	
Otina (1938)	United Kingdom	6,217	
Permian (1931)	Panama	8,890	Aruba to Guantanamo Bay Naval Base
Ponca City (1919)	United States	7,051	Aruba to Guantanamo Bay Naval Base
Prins Willem III (1939)	Netherlands	1,524	
Prometheus (1923)	Panama	8,890	Aruba to Guantanamo Bay Naval Base
Robert F Hand (1933)	United Kingdom	12,197	Aruba to Guantanamo Bay Naval Base
Seminole (1936)	United Kingdom	10,389	Aruba to Guantanamo Bay Naval Base
Svealand (1925)	Sweden	15,300	
Thorsholm (1937)	Norway	9,937	Curaçao to Guantanamo Bay Naval Base
USCG 475	United States Navy		Escort 8 Nov – 11 Nov
USCGC Agassiz (WSC-126)	United States Navy		Escort 8 Nov – 11 Nov
USCGC Colfax (WSC-133)	United States Navy		Escort 8 Nov – 11 Nov
USCGC Dix (WSC-136)	United States Navy		Escort 8 Nov – 11 Nov
USCG Rush (WSC-151)	United States Navy		Escort 8 Nov – 11 Nov
USS 608	United States Navy		Escort 6 Nov – 11 Nov
USS Breckinridge (DD-148)	United States Navy		Escort 6 Nov – 11 Nov; Destroyer
PT-22	United States Navy		Escort 8 Nov – 11 Nov; Torpedo boat
USS PC-493	United States Navy		Escort 6 Nov – 11 Nov
USS PC-549	United States Navy		Escort 8 Nov – 11 Nov
USS PC-566	United States Navy		Escort 6 Nov – 11 Nov
USS PC-583	United States Navy		Escort 6 Nov – 11 Nov
USS PC-609	United States Navy		Escort 6 Nov – 11 Nov
USS Surprise (PG-63)	United States Navy		Escort 6 Nov – 11 Nov
Vacuum (1920)	United States	7,020	
Wallace E Pratt (1937)	United States	7,991	
Walter Jennings (1921)	United States	9,564	Aruba to Guantanamo Bay Naval Base

== Bibliography ==
- Hague, Arnold (2000). The Allied Convoy System 1939–1945. ISBN 1-86176-147-3.
- Rohwer, J.; Hummelchen, G. (1992). Chronology of the War at Sea 1939–1945. Naval Institute Press. ISBN 1-55750-105-X.
