= SS Empire Airman (1941) =

World War II merchant ship of the United Kingdom

History
- Name: Empire Airman (1942–45); San Wenceslao (1945–59)
- Namesake: Saint Wenceslas
- Owner: Ministry of War Transport (1941–45); Eagle Oil & Shipping Co. (1945–59)
- Operator: Eagle Oil & Shipping Co (1942–59)
- Port of registry: Sunderland
- Builder: Sir J. Laing & Sons Ltd., Sunderland
- Yard number: 739
- Launched: 18 November 1941
- Completed: January 1942
- Identification: UK Official Number 169009; Code letters BCWX
- Fate: Scrapped in Hong Kong, 1959

General characteristics
- Tonnage: 9,813 GRT; 5,782 NRT
- Length: 484 ft 0 in (147.52 m)
- Beam: 68 ft 3 in (20.80 m)
- Depth: 36 ft 1 in (11.00 m)
- Propulsion: 1 x triple expansion steam engine (North East Marine Engineering Co (1938) Ltd, Newcastle upon Tyne) 674 hp (503 kW)
- Speed: 14 knots (26 km/h)

Empire Airman was a 9,813 ton tanker that was built in 1941. She was renamed San Wenceslao in 1946 and served until 1959 when she was scrapped.

== Description ==
The ship was 484 feet 0 inches (147.52 m) long, with a beam of 68 feet 3 inches (20.80 m) and a depth of 36 feet 1 inch (11.00 m). She was propelled by a 674 hp (503 kW) triple expansion steam engine that was built by the North East Marine Engineering Co (1938) Ltd, Newcastle upon Tyne. It could propel the ship at 14 knots (26 km/h).

== History ==
Empire Airman was built by Sir J. Laing & Sons Ltd, Sunderland as yard number 739. She was launched on 18 November 1941 and completed in January 1942. Empire Airman was owned by the Ministry of War Transport and operated under the management of the Eagle Oil and Shipping Company.

== War service ==
Empire Airman was a member of a number of convoys during the Second World War.

HX 178

Convoy HX 178 sailed from Halifax, Nova Scotia on 3 March 1942 and reached Liverpool on 17 March.

SL 112

Convoy SL 112 sailed from Freetown on 4 June 1942 and reached Liverpool on 23 June. Empire Airman joined the convoy at sea, being en route from Aruba to Belfast laden with oil and motor spirit.

TAG 19

Convoy TAG 19 sailed from Aruba on 6 November 1942, arriving at Guantanamo on 11 November 1942.

KMS 4

Convoy KMS 5 sailed from the Clyde on 11 December 1942, and reached Gibraltar on 24 December and Bone on 27 December.

MKS 16A

Convoy MKS 16A sailed from Tripoli on 29 June 1943 and reached Gibraltar on 6 July.

From 1944 Empire Airman was under charter to an American oil company to carry aviation fuel. She operated between Williamstown on the Yarra River and various Pacific islands, including New Guinea and the Solomon Islands.

== Post war service ==
In 1945, Empire Airman was sold to her operators, who renamed her San Wenceslao. She served for thirteen years and arrived for scrapping in Hong Kong on 20 July 1959.

== Official number and code letters ==
Official numbers were a forerunner to IMO Numbers.

Empire Airman had the Official Number 169009 on Lloyd's Register and used the Code Letters BCWX
