= ZG convoys =

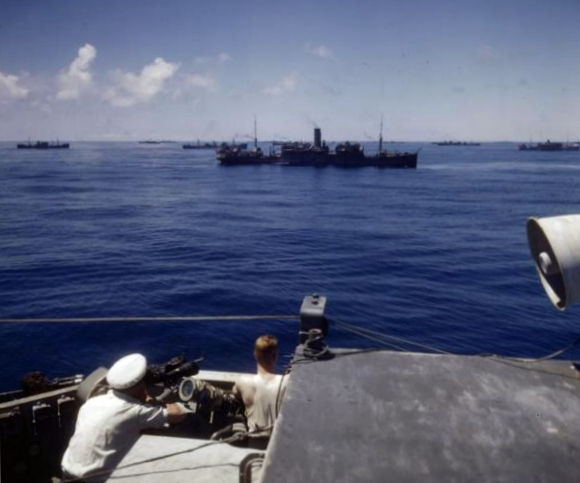
- View of a convoy during the Second World War.
- Type: ZG Convoys
- Location: Caribbean Sea
- Planned: 141
- Objective: Merchant convoys between Cristóbal, Colón, Panama, and Guantanamo Bay, Cuba
- Date: August 1942 to May 1945

Ports of call for ZG convoys

The ZG convoys were a series of Caribbean convoys which ran during the Battle of the Atlantic in World War II.

They take their name from the route: Cristóbal, Colón, Panama to Guantanamo, Cuba.

== Overview ==
The ZG series was the reverse of GZ series that ran from 31 August 1942 until 7 May 1945. There were 141 ZG convoys, comprising 950 individual ship listings and 86 escort ships listed. Almost all ships listed in a convoy made the complete trip between Cristóbal and Guantanamo with a few going to Kingston, Jamaica.

The series started with ZG 1 through ZG 139. There are no ships listed as being lost.

== Convoy list ==
=== 1942 ===
Convoy	Departure Date	Arrival Date	No.of Merchant Ships	No.of Escort Ships	Notes
ZG 1	31 August 1942	5 September 1942	10	5	0 vessels lost
ZG 2	7 September 1942	11 September 1942	15	5	0 vessels lost
ZG 3	14 September 1942	17 September 1942	8	5	0 vessels lost
ZG 4	20 September 1942	25 September 1942	8	7	0 vessels lost
ZG 5	28 September 1942	3 October 1942	9	6	0 vessels lost
ZG 6	5 October 1942	9 October 1942	11	6	0 vessels lost
ZG 7	9 October 1942	12 October 1942	5	5	0 vessels lost
ZG 8	17 October 1942	21 October 1942	18	6	0 vessels lost
ZG 9	25 October 1942	29 October 1942	17	7	0 vessels lost
ZG 10	2 November 1942	5 November 1942	9	5	0 vessels lost
ZG 11	11 November 1942	14 November 1942	14	7	0 vessels lost
ZG 12	18 November 1942	22 November 1942	8	6	0 vessels lost
ZG 13	26 November 1942	30 November 1942	13	6	0 vessels lost
ZG 14	4 December 1942	8 December 1942	15	7	0 vessels lost
ZG 15	12 December 1942	16 December 1942	16	4	0 vessels lost
ZG 16	20 December 1942	24 December 1942	14	4	0 vessels lost
ZG 17	28 December 1942	1 January 1943	17	4	0 vessels lost

=== 1943 ===
Convoy	Departure Date	Arrival Date	No.of Merchant Ships	No.of Escort Ships	Notes
ZG 18	4 January 1943	8 January 1943	8	5	0 vessels lost
ZG 19	16 January 1943	20 January 1943	23	5	0 vessels lost
ZG 20	24 January 1943	28 January 1943	24	5	0 vessels lost
ZG 21	3 February 1943	7 February 1943	16	5	0 vessels lost
ZG 22	13 February 1943	17 February 1943	22	5	0 vessels lost
ZG 23	23 February 1943	28 February 1943	1	6	0 vessels lost
ZG 24	5 March 1943	9 March 1943	28	5	0 vessels lost
ZG 25	15 March 1943	19 March 1943	19	6	0 vessels lost
ZG 26	25 March 1943	29 March 1943	18	8	0 vessels lost
ZG 27	4 April 1943	8 April 1943	26	8	0 vessels lost
ZG 28	14 April 1943	18 April 1943	25	5	0 vessels lost
ZG 29	24 April 1943	28 April 1943	24	8	0 vessels lost
ZG 30	4 May 1943	8 May 1943	11	6	0 vessels lost
ZG 31	14 May 1943	18 May 1943	14	7	0 vessels lost
ZG 32	24 May 1943	28 May 1943	14	9	0 vessels lost
ZG 33	3 June 1943	7 June 1943	10	10	0 vessels lost
ZG 34	13 June 1943	17 June 1943	11	11	0 vessels lost
ZG 35	23 June 1943	27 June 1943	18	7	0 vessels lost
ZG 36	3 July 1943	7 July 1943	8	9	0 vessels lost
ZG 37	13 July 1943	17 July 1943	7	13	0 vessels lost
ZG 38	23 July 1943	27 July 1943	8	7	0 vessels lost
ZG 39	2 August 1943	6 August 1943	14	5	0 vessels lost
ZG 40	12 August 1943	16 August 1943	5	7	0 vessels lost
ZG 41	22 August 1943	26 August 1943	7	6	0 vessels lost
ZG 42	1 September 1943	5 September 1943	4	6	0 vessels lost
ZG 43	11 September 1943	15 September 1943	3	5	0 vessels lost
ZG 44	21 September 1943	23 September 1943	3	5	0 vessels lost
ZG 45	1 October 1943	4 October 1943	3	5	0 vessels lost
ZG 46	11 October 1943	15 October 1943	4	6	0 vessels lost
ZG 47	21 October 1943	24 October 1943	1	5	0 vessels lost
ZG 48	31 October 1943	4 November 1943	3	5	0 vessels lost
ZG 49	10 November 1943	12 November 1943	2	5	0 vessels lost
ZG 50	20 November 1943	24 November 1943	1	5	0 vessels lost
ZG 51	30 November 1943	4 December 1943	11	0	0 vessels lost
ZG 52	10 December 1943	14 December 1943	12	0	0 vessels lost
ZG 53	20 December 1943	24 December 1943	14	0	0 vessels lost
ZG 54	30 December 1943	1 January 1944	6	0	0 vessels lost

=== 1944 ===
There are no escorts list for 1944.

Convoy	Departure Date	Arrival Date	No.of Merchant Ships	Notes
ZG 55	9 January 1944	13 January 1944	11	0 vessels lost
ZG 56	20 January 1944	23 January 1944	7	0 vessels lost
ZG 57	29 January 1944	2 February 1944	9	0 vessels lost
ZG 58	8 February 1944	12 February 1944	18	0 vessels lost
ZG 59	18 February 1944	22 February 1944	16	0 vessels lost
ZG 60	28 February 1944	3 March 1944	18	0 vessels lost
ZG 61	9 March 1944	14 March 1944	12	0 vessels lost
ZG 62	19 March 1944	23 March 1944	14	0 vessels lost
ZG 63	29 March 1944	2 April 1944	10	0 vessels lost
ZG 64	8 April 1944	13 April 1944	16	0 vessels lost
ZG 65	18 April 1944	22 April 1944	11	0 vessels lost
ZG 66	28 April 1944	2 May 1944	19	0 vessels lost
ZG 67	8 May 1944	12 May 1944	7	0 vessels lost
ZG 68	18 May 1944	22 May 1944	9	0 vessels lost
ZG 69	28 May 1944	31 May 1944	6	0 vessels lost
ZG 70	2 June 1944	6 June 1944	6	0 vessels lost
ZG 71	7 June 1944	10 June 1944	5	0 vessels lost
ZG 72	12 June 1944	16 June 1944	8	0 vessels lost
ZG 73	17 June 1944	20 June 1944	2	0 vessels lost
ZG 74	22 June 1944	26 June 1944	7	0 vessels lost
ZG 75	27 June 1944	2 July 1944	9	0 vessels lost
ZG 76	2 July 1944	6 July 1944	7	0 vessels lost
ZG 77	7 July 1944	10 July 1944	7	0 vessels lost
ZG 78	12 July 1944	16 July 1944	11	0 vessels lost
ZG 79	17 July 1944	21 July 1944	8	0 vessels lost
ZG 80	22 July 1944	26 July 1944	10	0 vessels lost
ZG 81	27 July 1944	30 July 1944	1	0 vessels lost
ZG 82	1 August 1944	3 August 1944	2	0 vessels lost
ZG 82A	1 August 1944	6 August 1944	3	0 vessels lost
ZG 83	6 August 1944	10 August 1944	1	0 vessels lost
ZG 84	12 August 1944	15 August 1944	1	0 vessels lost
ZG 85	Not listed	Not listed	Not listed	
ZG 86	21 August 1944	25 August 1944	4	0 vessels lost
ZG 87	Not listed	Not listed	Not listed	
ZG 88	31 August 1944	4 September 1944	3	0 vessels lost
ZG 89	5 September 1944	8 September 1944	3	0 vessels lost
ZG 90	10 September 1944	13 September 1944	2	0 vessels lost
ZG 91	Not listed	Not listed	Not listed	
ZG 92	Not listed	Not listed	Not listed	
ZG 93	25 September 1944	29 September 1944	3	0 vessels lost
ZG 94	Not listed	Not listed	Not listed	
ZG 95	6 October 1944	9 October 1944	3	0 vessels lost
ZG 96	10 October 1944	12 October 1944	1	0 vessels lost
ZG 96A	10 October 1944	13 October 1944	1	0 vessels lost
ZG 97	15 October 1944	19 October 1944	2	0 vessels lost
ZG 98	20 October 1944	23 October 1944	1	0 vessels lost
ZG 99	25 October 1944	29 October 1944	2	0 vessels lost
ZG 100	30 October 1944	3 November 1944	4	0 vessels lost
ZG 101	Not listed	Not listed	Not listed	
ZG 102	9 November 1944	13 November 1944	2	0 vessels lost
ZG 103	14 November 1944	17 November 1944	1	0 vessels lost
ZG 104	19 November 1944	22 November 1944	1	0 vessels lost
ZG 105	24 November 1944	28 November 1944	4	0 vessels lost
ZG 106	30 November 1944	3 December 1944	1	0 vessels lost
ZG 107	4 December 1944	7 December 1944	2	0 vessels lost
ZG 108	9 December 1944	13 December 1944	2	0 vessels lost
ZG 109	Not listed	Not listed	Not listed	
ZG 110	19 December 1944	23 December 1944	4	0 vessels lost
ZG 111	24 December 1944	27 December 1944	1	0 vessels lost
ZG 112	29 December 1944	31 December 1944	1	0 vessels lost

=== 1945 ===
There are no escorts listed for 1945.

Convoy	Departure Date	Arrival Date	No.of Merchant Ships	Notes
ZG 113	3 January 1945	7 January 1945	1	0 vessels lost
ZG 114	8 January 1945	11 January 1945	1	0 vessels lost
ZG 115	13 January 1945	17 January 1945	4	0 vessels lost
ZG 116	18 January 1945	22 January 1945	2	0 vessels lost
ZG 117	23 January 1945	27 January 1945	1	0 vessels lost
ZG 118	28 January 1945	2 February 1945	3	0 vessels lost
ZG 119	2 February 1945	5 February 1945	1	0 vessels lost
ZG 120	7 February 1945	10 February 1945	2	0 vessels lost
ZG 121	Not listed	Not listed	Not listed	
ZG 122	Not listed	Not listed	Not listed	
ZG 123	22 February 1945	27 February 1945	2	0 vessels lost
ZG 124	27 February 1945	2 March 1945	2	0 vessels lost
ZG 125	4 March 1945	8 March 1945	2	0 vessels lost
ZG 126	9 March 1945	12 March 1945	1	0 vessels lost
ZG 127	Not listed	Not listed	Not listed	
ZG 128	20 March 1945	23 March 1945	1	0 vessels lost
ZG 129	24 March 1945	27 March 1945	1	0 vessels lost
ZG 130	Not listed	Not listed	Not listed	
ZG 131	3 April 1945	5 April 1945	1	0 vessels lost
ZG 132	Not listed	Not listed	Not listed	
ZG 133	13 April 1945	17 April 1945	1	0 vessels lost
ZG 134	18 April 1945	23 April 1945	2	0 vessels lost
ZG 135	23 April 1945	27 April 1945	1	0 vessels lost
ZG 136	28 April 1945	1 May 1945	1	0 vessels lost
ZG 137	2 May 1945	7 May 1945	2	0 vessels lost
ZG 138	Not listed	Not listed	Not listed	
ZG 139	Not listed	Not listed	Not listed	

== Bibliography ==
=== Books ===
- Arnold Hague (2000). The Allied Convoy System 1939–1945. Chatham. ISBN 1-86176-147-3.
- Rohwer, J. & Hummelchen, G. (1992). Chronology of the War at Sea 1939–1945. Naval Institute Press. ISBN 1-55750-105-X.
- Silverstone, Paul H. (1968). U.S. Warships of World War II. Doubleday and Company.

=== Online resources ===
- "ZG Convoy Series". Convoy Web - Arnold Hague Convoy Database.
