= RFA Eaglesdale =

1942 Dale-class replenishment oiler for the Royal Fleet Auxiliary

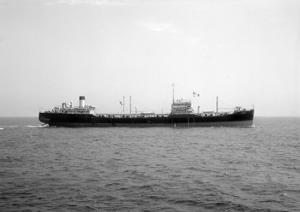

History

United Kingdom
- Name: Empire Metal (1941-42); RFA Eaglesdale (1942-59)
- Builder: Furness Shipbuilding Company, Haverton Hill-on-Tees
- Yard number: 339
- Launched: 18 November 1941
- Commissioned: 9 January 1942
- Decommissioned: 21 July 1958
- Fate: Scrapped 1959

General characteristics
- Class & type: Dale-class fleet tanker
- Tonnage: 8,028 GRT
- Displacement: 16,820 tons full load
- Length: 479 ft (146.00 m)
- Beam: 61 ft 2 in (18.64 m)
- Draught: 27 ft 1 in (8.26 m)
- Propulsion: 3 cyl Triple expansion steam. 674 nhp. One shaft.
- Speed: 11.5 knots (21.3 km/h)
- Complement: 44

RFA Eaglesdale (A104) was a Dale-class fleet tanker of the Royal Fleet Auxiliary (RFA). She was launched in 1941 as Empire Metal and transferred to the RFA on completion in 1941.

== History ==
The 8,032 GRT Empire Metal was built by Furness Shipbuilding Co Ltd, Haverton Hill-on-Tees as yard number 339. She was launched on 18 November 1941 and on completion in January 1942 she was transferred to the RFA and renamed Eaglesdale.

=== War service ===
Eaglesdale was a member of a number of convoys during the Second World War.

EN 57

Eaglesdale was a member of Convoy EN 57 which departed Methil, Fife on 16 February 1942 and arrived at Oban, Argyllshire on 19 February. Eaglesdale joined the convoy from the Clyde, she was in ballast.

OS 23

Eaglesdale was a member of Convoy OS 23 which departed Liverpool on 24 March 1942 and arrived at Freetown, Sierra Leone on 11 April. She was in ballast and her final destination was Curaçao, Netherlands Antilles.

TAG 19

Convoy TAG 19 departed Curaçao on 6 November 1942, arriving at Guantanamo on 11 November 1942.

BP 83

Eaglesdale was a member of Convoy BP 83 which departed Bombay on 11 June 1943 and arrived at Bandar Abbas, Iran on 16 June.

PA 43

Eaglesdale was a member of Convoy PA 43 which departed Bandar Abbas on 26 June 1943 and arrived at Aden on 3 July.

CX 17

Eaglesdale was a member of Convoy CX 17 which departed Colombo, Ceylon on 3 February 1944 and arrived at Addu Atoll, Maldives on 6 February

JC 46

Eaglesdale was a member of Convoy JC 46 which departed Colombo on 26 April 1944 and arrived at Calcutta on 3 May. Eaglesdale detached from the convoy en route and sailed to Trincomalee, Ceylon where she arrived on 28 April.

RK 34A

Eaglesdale was a member of Convoy RK 34A which departed Chittagong, India on 13 January 1945 and arrived at Akyab, Burma on 14 January.

Eaglesdale was used for trials of refuelling equipment after the capture of a German supply ship. This included the fitting of rubber hoses and deck roller.

=== Postwar service ===
She was decommissioned on 21 July 1958 and was laid up on the River Tyne. Eaglesdale arrived on 29 November 1959 at Hamburg, West Germany for scrapping.
