= GZ convoys =

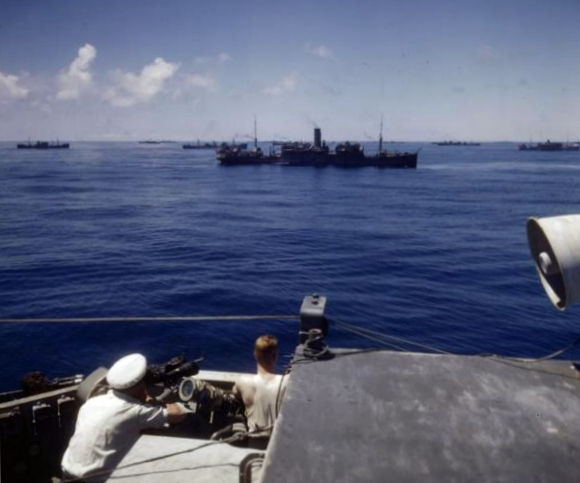
- View of a convoy during the Second World War.
- Type: GZ Convoys
- Location: Caribbean Sea
- Planned: 140
- Objective: Merchant convoys between Guantanamo Bay, Cuba, and Cristóbal, Colón, Panama
- Date: September 1942 to May 1945

Ports of call for GZ convoys

The GZ convoys were a series of Caribbean convoys which ran during the Battle of the Atlantic in World War II.

They take their name from the route: Guantanamo, Cuba to Cristóbal, Colón, Panama

== Overview ==
The GZ series was the reverse of ZG series that ran from 31 August 1942 until 17 May 1945. There were 139 GZ convoys, comprising 1,151 individual ship listings. The escort ships for these convoys are not listed in the reference cited. Almost all ships listed in a convoy made the complete trip between Guantanamo and Cristóbal with a few going to Kingston, Jamaica, or Cartagena, Colombia.

The series started with GZ 1 through GZ 139 with only 1 convoy being cancelled, GZ 31. There are only two ships listed as being lost, and the losses were not due to enemy action, one grounded and broke in two and the other was from a collision.

== Convoy List ==
=== 1942 ===
Convoy	Departure Date	Arrival Date	No.of Merchant Ships	Notes
GZ 1	31 August 1942	3 September 1942	8	0 vessels lost
GZ 2	7 September 1942	11 September 1942	11	0 vessels lost
GZ 3	13 September 1942	17 September 1942	14	0 vessels lost
GZ 4	20 September 1942	24 September 1942	12	0 vessels lost
GZ 5	27 September 1942	30 September 1942	15	0 vessels lost
GZ 6	4 October 1942	9 October 1942	28	0 vessels lost
GZ 7	12 October 1942	16 October 1942	12	0 vessels lost
GZ 7A	12 October 1942	16 October 1942	3	0 vessels lost
GZ 8	16 October 1942	19 October 1942	6	0 vessels lost
GZ 9	23 October 1942	26 October 1942	15	0 vessels lost
GZ 10	31 October 1942	4 November 1942	18	0 vessels lost
GZ 11	8 November 1942	12 November 1942	16	0 vessels lost
GZ 12	16 November 1942	19 November 1942	20	0 vessels lost
GZ 13	24 November 1942	27 November 1942	24	0 vessels lost
GZ 14	2 December 1942	5 December 1942	17	0 vessels lost
GZ 15	10 December 1942	13 December 1942	13	0 vessels lost
GZ 16	18 December 1942	21 December 1942	15	0 vessels lost
GZ 17	26 December 1942	29 December 1942	18	0 vessels lost

=== 1943 ===
Convoy	Departure Date	Arrival Date	No.of Merchant Ships	Notes
GZ 18	3 January 1943	7 January 1943	14	0 vessels lost
GZ 19	13 January 1943	17 January 1943	1	0 vessels lost
GZ 20	23 January 1943	27 January 1943	16	0 vessels lost
GZ 21	5 February 1943	8 February 1943	4	0 vessels lost
GZ 22	15 February 1943	18 February 1943	4	0 vessels lost
GZ 23	25 February 1943	1 March 1943	6	0 vessels lost
GZ 24	7 March 1943	11 March 1943	3	0 vessels lost
GZ 25	17 March 1943	21 March 1943	15	0 vessels lost
GZ 26	27 March 1943	31 March 1943	22	0 vessels lost
GZ 27	31 March 1943	3 April 1943	11	0 vessels lost
GZ 28	10 April 1943	14 April 1943	27	0 vessels lost
GZ 29	20 April 1943	24 April 1943	12	0 vessels lost
GZ 30	30 April 1943	4 May 1943	13	0 vessels lost
GZ 31				Cancelled
GZ 32	20 May 1943	24 May 1943	8	0 vessels lost
GZ 33	30 May 1943	3 June 1943	16	0 vessels lost
GZ 34	9 June 1943	13 June 1943	4	0 vessels lost
GZ 35	19 June 1943	23 June 1943	11	0 vessels lost
GZ 36	29 June 1943	2 July 1943	3	0 vessels lost
GZ 37	9 July 1943	12 July 1943	1	0 vessels lost
GZ 38	19 July 1943	22 July 1943	3	0 vessels lost
GZ 39	29 July 1943	2 August 1943	2	0 vessels lost
GZ 40	8 August 1943	12 August 1943	9	0 vessels lost
GZ 41	18 August 1943	22 August 1943	8	0 vessels lost
GZ 42	28 August 1943	1 September 1943	1	0 vessels lost
GZ 43	7 September 1943	11 September 1943	1	0 vessels lost
GZ 44	16 September 1943	20 September 1943	3	0 vessels lost
GZ 45	26 September 1943	30 September 1943	2	0 vessels lost
GZ 46	7 October 1943	Not listed	3	0 vessels lost
GZ 47	16 October 1943	19 October 1943	5	0 vessels lost
GZ 48	26 October 1943	Not listed	Not listed	
GZ 49	5 November 1943	9 November 1943	9	0 vessels lost
GZ 50	15 November 1943	Not listed	Not listed	
GZ 51	25 November 1943	30 November 1943	3	0 vessels lost
GZ 52	5 December 1943	9 December 1943	10	0 vessels lost
GZ 53	15 December 1943	19 December 1943	22	1 vessel lost; James Withycombe, ran aground off Cristóbal, broke in two and was abandoned
GZ 54	25 December 1943	29 December 1943	20	0 vessels lost

=== 1944 ===
Convoy	Departure Date	Arrival Date	No.of Merchant Ships	Notes
GZ 55	5 January 1944	9 January 1944	17	0 vessels lost
GZ 56	15 January 1944	19 January 1944	14	0 vessels lost
GZ 57	24 January 1944	28 January 1944	19	0 vessels lost
GZ 58	3 February 1944	7 February 1944	14	0 vessels lost
GZ 59	13 February 1944	17 February 1944	16	0 vessels lost
GZ 60	23 February 1944	27 February 1944	16	0 vessels lost
GZ 61	5 March 1944	9 March 1944	7	0 vessels lost
GZ 62	15 March 1944	19 March 1944	14	0 vessels lost
GZ 63	24 March 1944	28 March 1944	20	0 vessels lost
GZ 64	4 April 1944	8 April 1944	16	0 vessels lost
GZ 65	14 April 1944	17 April 1944	19	0 vessels lost
GZ 66	23 April 1944	28 April 1944	9	0 vessels lost
GZ 67	4 May 1944	8 May 1944	5	0 vessels lost
GZ 68	14 May 1944	18 May 1944	8	0 vessels lost
GZ 69	23 May 1944	27 May 1944	11	0 vessels lost
GZ 70	3 June 1944	7 June 1944	13	0 vessels lost
GZ 71	8 June 1944	11 June 1944	14	0 vessels lost
GZ 72	13 June 1944	17 June 1944	20	0 vessels lost
GZ 73	18 June 1944	22 June 1944	12	0 vessels lost
GZ 74	21 June 1944	25 June 1944	11	0 vessels lost
GZ 75	28 June 1944	2 July 1944	11	0 vessels lost
GZ 76	3 July 1944	7 July 1944	14	0 vessels lost
GZ 77	8 July 1944	12 July 1944	14	0 vessels lost
GZ 78	13 July 1944	17 July 1944	13	0 vessels lost
GZ 79	18 July 1944	22 July 1944	11	0 vessels lost
GZ 80	23 July 1944	27 July 1944	13	0 vessels lost
GZ 81	28 July 1944	Not listed	4	0 vessels lost
GZ 82	2 August 1944	6 August 1944	3	0 vessels lost
GZ 83	7 August 1944	11 August 1944	3	0 vessels lost
GZ 84	12 August 1944	15 August 1944	9	0 vessels lost
GZ 85	17 August 1944	21 August 1944	9	0 vessels lost
GZ 86	22 August 1944	25 August 1944	9	0 vessels lost
GZ 87	27 August 1944	31 August 1944	7	0 vessels lost
GZ 88	1 September 1944	5 September 1944	9	0 vessels lost
GZ 89	6 September 1944	10 September 1944	5	1 vessel lost; Hindoo, collided with Australia Star and sank in the Caribbean Sea
GZ 90	10 September 1944	13 September 1944	5	0 vessels lost
GZ 91	16 September 1944	20 September 1944	5	0 vessels lost
GZ 92	21 September 1944	25 September 1944	4	0 vessels lost
GZ 93	26 September 1944	30 September 1944	6	0 vessels lost
GZ 94	1 October 1944	4 October 1944	2	0 vessels lost
GZ 95	6 October 1944	9 October 1944	2	0 vessels lost
GZ 96	11 October 1944	14 October 1944	7	0 vessels lost
GZ 97	16 October 1944	20 October 1944	11	0 vessels lost
GZ 98	21 October 1944	24 October 1944	3	0 vessels lost
GZ 99	26 October 1944	29 October 1944	3	0 vessels lost
GZ 100	31 October 1944	3 November 1944	4	0 vessels lost
GZ 101	5 November 1944	9 November 1944	7	0 vessels lost
GZ 102	10 November 1944	13 November 1944	1	0 vessels lost
GZ 103	15 November 1944	18 November 1944	5	0 vessels lost
GZ 104	20 November 1944	23 November 1944	1	0 vessels lost
GZ 105	25 November 1944	28 November 1944	3	0 vessels lost
GZ 106	30 November 1944	4 December 1944	2	0 vessels lost
GZ 107	4 December 1944	7 December 1944	1	0 vessels lost
GZ 108	10 December 1944	13 December 1944	3	0 vessels lost
GZ 109	15 December 1944	19 December 1944	5	0 vessels lost
GZ 110	20 December 1944	24 December 1944	2	0 vessels lost
GZ 111	24 December 1944	27 December 1944	13	0 vessels lost
GZ 112	30 December 1944	3 January 1945	7	0 vessels lost

=== 1945 ===
Convoy	Departure Date	Arrival Date	No.of Merchant Ships	Notes
GZ 113	4 January 1945	7 January 1945	1	0 vessels lost
GZ 114	9 January 1945	12 January 1945	2	0 vessels lost
GZ 115	14 January 1945	17 January 1945	1	0 vessels lost
GZ 116	19 January 1945	22 January 1945	4	0 vessels lost
GZ 117	24 January 1945	27 January 1945	3	0 vessels lost
GZ 118	29 January 1945	1 February 1945	7	0 vessels lost
GZ 119	3 February 1945	6 February 1945	4	0 vessels lost
GZ 120	9 February 1945	12 February 1945	3	0 vessels lost
GZ 121	13 February 1945	17 February 1945	4	0 vessels lost
GZ 122	18 February 1945	22 February 1945	3	0 vessels lost
GZ 123	23 February 1945	26 February 1945	1	0 vessels lost
GZ 124	1 March 1945	4 March 1945	3	0 vessels lost
GZ 125	5 March 1945	9 March 1945	6	0 vessels lost
GZ 126	10 March 1945	13 March 1945	3	0 vessels lost
GZ 127	15 March 1945	19 March 1945	11	0 vessels lost
GZ 128	20 March 1945	23 March 1945	4	0 vessels lost
GZ 129	25 March 1945	29 March 1945	9	0 vessels lost
GZ 130	30 March 1945	2 April 1945	7	0 vessels lost
GZ 131	4 April 1945	7 April 1945	2	0 vessels lost
GZ 132	9 April 1945	13 April 1945	4	0 vessels lost
GZ 133	14 April 1945	17 April 1945	1	0 vessels lost
GZ 134	19 April 1945	23 April 1945	1	0 vessels lost
GZ 135	24 April 1945	27 April 1945	1	0 vessels lost
GZ 136	28 April 1945	30 April 1945	1	0 vessels lost
GZ 137	4 May 1945	7 May 1945	1	0 vessels lost
GZ 138	9 May 1945	12 May 1945	3	0 vessels lost
GZ 139	14 May 1945	17 May 1945	3	0 vessels lost

== Notes ==
Citations

== Bibliography ==
Books

- Arnold Hague (2000). The Allied Convoy System 1939–1945. Chatham. ISBN 1-86176-147-3.
- Rohwer, J. & Hummelchen, G. (1992). Chronology of the War at Sea 1939–1945. Naval Institute Press. ISBN 1-55750-105-X.
- Silverstone, Paul H. (1968). U.S. Warships of World War II. Doubleday and Company.

Online resources

- "GZ Convoy Series". Convoy Web - Arnold Hague Convoy Database.
