= TAG convoys =

Caribbean convoys during the Battle of the Atlantic

The TAG convoys were a series of Caribbean convoys which ran during the Battle of the Atlantic in the Second World War. They take their name from the route: Trinidad to Aruba and Guantanamo, Cuba

== Overview ==
The TAG series was the reverse of GAT series. The series ran from August 1942 to May 1945. There were 205 TAG convoys, comprising 3,843 individual ship listings. Five convoys were successfully attacked by U-boats during 1942 and 1943, with 12 ships sunk and one damaged but then later declared a total loss.

== Convoy list ==
Convoy	Departure Date	Arrival Date	No. of merchant ships	No. of escort ships	Notes
TAG 1	29 Aug 1942	5 Sep 1942	31	10	0 vessels lost
TAG 2	1 Sep 1942	7 Sep 1942	7	8	0 vessels lost
TAG 3	5 Sep 1942	11 Sep 1942	21	7	0 vessels lost
TAG 4	9 Sep 1942	14 Sep 1942	18	6	0 vessels lost
TAG 5	12 Sep 1942	16 Sep 1942	17	7	2 vessels sunk. 1 damaged; she eventually reached New Orleans, but declared a total loss
TAG 6	16 Sep 1942	21 Sep 1942	29	8	0 vessels lost
TAG 7	19 Sep 1942	24 Sep 1942	22	6	0 vessels lost
TAG 8	22 Sep 1942	27 Sep 1942	15	7	0 vessels lost
TAG 9	27 Sep 1942	2 Oct 1942	19	9	0 vessels lost
TAG 10	3 Oct 1942	8 Oct 1942	39	6	0 vessels lost
TAG 11	6 Oct 1942	11 Oct 1942	11	7	0 vessels lost
TAG 12	9 Oct 1942	14 Oct 1942	20	10	0 vessels lost
TAG 13	13 Oct 1942	18 Oct 1942	12	11	0 vessels lost
TAG 14	17 Oct 1942	22 Oct 1942	24	7	0 vessels lost
TAG 15	21 Oct 1942	26 Oct 1942	25	8	0 vessels lost
TAG 16	25 Oct 1942	31 Oct 1942	34	7	0 vessels lost
TAG 17	29 Oct 1942	3 Nov 1942	28	7	0 vessels lost
TAG 18	2 Nov 1942	8 Nov 1942	37	8	6 vessels sunk (40,477 tons)
TAG 19	6 Nov 1942	11 Nov 1942	31	14	2 vessels sunk
TAG 20	10 Nov 1942	15 Nov 1942	27	10	1 vessel sunk
TAG 70	3 Jul 1943	8 Jul 1943	20	0	1 vessel sunk

== Exceptions ==
There were two exceptions, namely special convoy TAG.SP, which ran in two sections from Trinidad to Kingston, Jamaica, and then on to Guantanamo in January 1943, without any losses, and Convoy TAG 205 which sailed from Curaçao to Guantanamo, and comprised only one ship.

== Bibliography ==
- Arnold Hague (2000). The Allied Convoy System 1939–1945. Chatham. ISBN 1-86176-147-3.
- Rohwer, J. & Hummelchen, G. (1992). Chronology of the War at Sea 1939–1945. Naval Institute Press. ISBN 1-55750-105-X.
- Silverstone, Paul H. (1968). U.S. Warships of World War II. Doubleday and Company.
