= KG convoys =

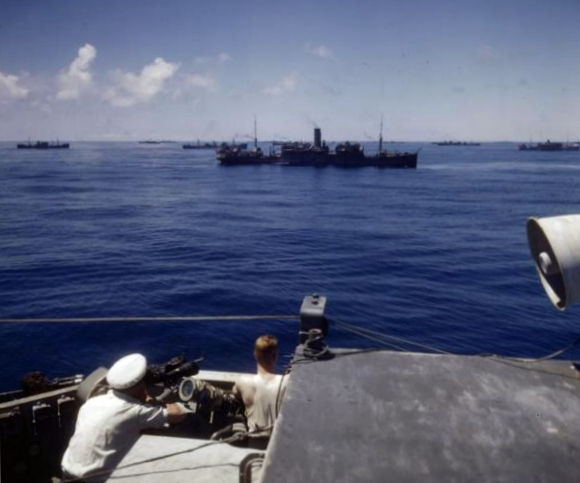
- View of a convoy during the Second World War.
- Type: KG Convoys
- Location: Caribbean Sea
- Planned: 180
- Objective: Merchant convoys between Key West, Florida, and Guantanamo Bay, Cuba
- Date: September 1942 to May 1945

Ports of call for KG convoys

The KG convoys were a series of Caribbean convoys which ran during the Battle of the Atlantic in World War II.

They take their name from the route: Key West, Florida to Guantanamo, Cuba

== Overview ==
The KG series was the reverse of GK series that ran from 1 September 1942 until 6 May 1945. There were 168 "KG" convoys, comprising 1,345 individual ship listings. The escort ships for these convoys are not listed in the reference cited. Almost all ships listed in a convoy made the complete trip between Key West and Guantanamo.

The series started with KG 600 through KG 779 with 12 convoys cancelled. There are also no ships listed as being lost.

== Convoy List ==
=== 1942 ===
Convoy	Departure Date	Arrival Date	No.of Merchant Ships	Notes
KG 600	1 September 1942	4 September 1942	14	0 vessels lost
KG 601	8 September 1942	12 September 1942	2	0 vessels lost
KG 602	15 September 1942	19 September 1942	8	0 vessels lost
KG 603	18 September 1942	21 September 1942	15	0 vessels lost
KG 604	22 September 1942	25 September 1942	2	0 vessels lost
KG 605	25 September 1942	Not listed	9	0 vessels lost
KG 606	29 September 1942	2 October 1942	9	0 vessels lost
KG 607	2 October 1942	5 October 1942	6	0 vessels lost
KG 608	9 October 1942	12 October 1942	15	Cancelled
KG 609	18 October 1942	22 October 1942	18	0 vessels lost
KG 610	26 October 1942	29 October 1942	14	0 vessels lost
KG 611	3 November 1942	7 November 1942	12	0 vessels lost
KG 612	11 November 1942	15 November 1942	10	0 vessels lost
KG 613	19 November 1942	23 November 1942	16	0 vessels lost
KG 614	27 November 1942	30 November 1942	14	0 vessels lost
KG 615	5 December 1942	8 December 1942	10	0 vessels lost
KG 616	13 December 1942	16 December 1942	9	0 vessels lost
KG 617	21 December 1942	25 December 1942	9	0 vessels lost
KG 618	29 December 1942	1 January 1943	11	0 vessels lost

=== 1943 ===
Convoy	Departure Date	Arrival Date	No.of Merchant Ships	Notes
KG 619	6 January 1943	10 January 1943	8	0 vessels lost
KG 620	14 January 1943	17 January 1943	14	0 vessels lost
KG 621	22 January 1943	25 January 1943	12	0 vessels lost
KG 622	30 January 1943	2 February 1943	8	0 vessels lost
KG 623	9 February 1943	12 February 1943	8	0 vessels lost
KG 624	20 February 1943	23 February 1943	6	0 vessels lost
KG 625	1 March 1943	4 March 1943	15	0 vessels lost
KG 626	12 March 1943	15 March 1943	20	0 vessels lost
KG 627	23 March 1943	26 March 1943	24	0 vessels lost
KG 628	26 March 1943	29 March 1943	4	0 vessels lost
KG 629	5 April 1943	8 April 1943	23	0 vessels lost
KG 630	15 April 1943	18 April 1943	34	0 vessels lost
KG 631	24 April 1943	27 April 1943	14	0 vessels lost
KG 632	6 May 1943	9 May 1943	8	0 vessels lost; Richard S Ewell, grounded and was refloated and returned to Key West
KG 633	15 May 1943	18 May 1943	23	0 vessels lost
KG 634	19 May 1943	22 May 1943	9	0 vessels lost
KG 635	25 May 1943	28 May 1943	22	0 vessels lost
KG 636	29 May 1943	1 June 1943	7	0 vessels lost
KG 637	3 June 1943	6 June 1943	14	0 vessels lost
KG 638	8 June 1943	12 June 1943	11	0 vessels lost
KG 639	13 June 1943	16 June 1943	7	0 vessels lost
KG 640	18 June 1943	21 June 1943	9	0 vessels lost
KG 641	23 June 1943	26 June 1943	6	0 vessels lost
KG 642	28 June 1943	1 July 1943	13	0 vessels lost
KG 643	4 July 1943	6 July 1943	5	0 vessels lost
KG 644	8 July 1943	11 July 1943	7	0 vessels lost
KG 645	13 July 1943	17 July 1943	9	0 vessels lost
KG 646	18 July 1943	Not listed	5	0 vessels lost
KG 647	23 July 1943	27 July 1943	10	0 vessels lost
KG 648	29 July 1943	1 August 1943	18	0 vessels lost
KG 649	2 August 1943	5 August 1943	14	0 vessels lost
KG 650	7 August 1943	10 August 1943	7	0 vessels lost
KG 651	12 August 1943	16 August 1943	8	0 vessels lost
KG 652	17 August 1943	20 August 1943	12	0 vessels lost
KG 653	23 August 1943	26 August 1943	8	0 vessels lost
KG 654	27 August 1943	31 August 1943	8	0 vessels lost
KG 655	1 September 1943	4 September 1943	8	0 vessels lost
KG 656	7 September 1943	10 September 1943	4	0 vessels lost
KG 657	11 September 1943	14 September 1943	10	0 vessels lost
KG 658	16 September 1943	19 September 1943	7	0 vessels lost
KG 659	23 September 1943	26 September 1943	6	0 vessels lost
KG 660	26 September 1943	1 October 1943	7	0 vessels lost
KG 661	3 October 1943	6 October 1943	14	0 vessels lost
KG 662	7 October 1943	10 October 1943	9	0 vessels lost
KG 663	11 October 1943	15 October 1943	4	0 vessels lost
KG 664	16 October 1943	19 October 1943	12	0 vessels lost
KG 665	21 October 1943	24 October 1943	6	0 vessels lost
KG 666	26 October 1943	29 October 1943	6	0 vessels lost
KG 667	31 October 1943	3 November 1943	9	0 vessels lost
KG 668	6 November 1943	9 November 1943	11	0 vessels lost
KG 669	10 November 1943	13 November 1943	9	0 vessels lost
KG 670	15 November 1943	18 November 1943	4	0 vessels lost
KG 671	20 November 1943	23 November 1943	14	0 vessels lost
KG 672	27 November 1943	29 November 1943	6	0 vessels lost
KG 673	30 November 1943	3 December 1943	13	0 vessels lost
KG 674	5 December 1943	8 December 1943	15	0 vessels lost
KG 675	11 December 1943	14 December 1943	13	0 vessels lost
KG 676	16 December 1943	19 December 1943	19	0 vessels lost
KG 677	20 December 1943	23 December 1943	10	0 vessels lost
KG 678	26 December 1943	29 December 1943	19	0 vessels lost
KG 679	30 December 1943	2 January 1944	10	0 vessels lost

=== 1944 ===
Convoy	Departure Date	Arrival Date	No.of Merchant Ships	Notes
KG 680	5 January 1944	8 January 1944	11	0 vessels lost
KG 681	10 January 1944	13 January 1944	11	0 vessels lost
KG 682	15 January 1944	18 January 1944	13	0 vessels lost
KG 683	19 January 1944	22 January 1944	7	0 vessels lost
KG 684	24 January 1944	27 January 1944	17	0 vessels lost
KG 685	29 January 1944	1 February 1944	11	0 vessels lost
KG 686	3 February 1944	6 February 1944	10	0 vessels lost
KG 687	8 February 1944	11 February 1944	14	0 vessels lost
KG 688	13 February 1944	17 February 1944	12	0 vessels lost
KG 689	18 February 1944	22 February 1944	12	0 vessels lost
KG 690	23 February 1944	26 February 1944	6	0 vessels lost
KG 691	28 February 1944	2 March 1944	10	0 vessels lost
KG 692	4 March 1944	7 March 1944	01	0 vessels lost
KG 693	9 March 1944	12 March 1944	13	0 vessels lost
KG 694	14 March 1944	17 March 1944	7	0 vessels lost
KG 695	19 March 1944	22 March 1944	12	0 vessels lost
KG 696	24 March 1944	27 March 1944	13	0 vessels lost
KG 697	29 March 1944	1 April 1944	10	0 vessels lost
KG 698	3 April 1944	6 April 1944	7	0 vessels lost
KG 699	8 April 1944	11 April 1944	11	0 vessels lost
KG 700	13 April 1944	16 April 1944	11	0 vessels lost
KG 701	18 April 1944	21 April 1944	9	0 vessels lost
KG 702	23 April 1944	26 April 1944	8	0 vessels lost
KG 703	28 April 1944	1 May 1944	7	0 vessels lost
KG 704	4 May 1944	7 May 1944	11	0 vessels lost
KG 705	8 May 1944	11 May 1944	10	0 vessels lost
KG 706	13 May 1944	16 May 1944	7	0 vessels lost
KG 707	18 May 1944	21 May 1944	12	0 vessels lost
KG 708	23 May 1944	26 May 1944	9	0 vessels lost
KG 709	28 May 1944	31 May 1944	9	0 vessels lost
KG 710	2 June 1944	Not listed	3	0 vessels lost
KG 711	7 June 1944	10 June 1944	11	0 vessels lost
KG 712	12 June 1944	15 June 1944	8	0 vessels lost
KG 713	17 June 1944	20 June 1944	6	0 vessels lost
KG 714	22 June 1944	25 June 1944	10	0 vessels lost
KG 715	27 June 1944	30 June 1944	9	0 vessels lost
KG 716	2 July 1944	5 July 1944	4	0 vessels lost
KG 717	7 July 1944	10 July 1944	2	0 vessels lost
KG 718	12 July 1944	15 July 1944	6	0 vessels lost
KG 719	17 July 1944	20 July 1944	2	0 vessels lost
KG 720	22 July 1944	25 July 1944	4	0 vessels lost
KG 721	27 July 1944	30 July 1944	2	0 vessels lost
KG 722	1 August 1944	4 August 1944	2	0 vessels lost
KG 723				Cancelled
KG 724	14 August 1944	Not listed	Not listed	
KG 725	16 August 1944	19 August 1944	5	0 vessels lost
KG 726	21 August 1944	Not listed	Not listed	
KG 727	26 August 1944	28 August 1944	3	0 vessels lost
KG 728	31 August 1944	3 September 1944	2	0 vessels lost
KG 729	5 September 1944	8 September 1944	1	0 vessels lost
KG 730	10 September 1944	13 September 1944	4	0 vessels lost
KG 731				Cancelled
KG 732	20 September 1944	Not listed	Not listed	
KG 733	25 September 1944	28 September 1944	2	0 vessels lost
KG 734	30 September 1944	3 October 1944	2	0 vessels lost
KG 735	5 October 1944	Not listed	3	0 vessels lost
KG 736	10 October 1944	Not listed	1	0 vessels lost
KG 737	15 October 1944	18 October 1944	1	0 vessels lost
KG 738				Cancelled
KG 739	25 October 1944	27 October 1944	2	0 vessels lost
KG 740				Cancelled
KG 741				Cancelled
KG 742	9 November 1944	Not listed	2	0 vessels lost
KG 743	14 November 1944	Not listed	1	0 vessels lost
KG 744	19 November 1944	Not listed	1	0 vessels lost
KG 745	24 November 1944	27 November 1944	3	0 vessels lost
KG 746				Cancelled
KG 747	4 December 1944	7 December 1944	4	0 vessels lost
KG 748	9 December 1944	12 December 1944	1	0 vessels lost
KG 749				Cancelled
KG 750	19 December 1944	Not listed	3	0 vessels lost
KG 751	27 December 1944	Not listed	Not listed	
KG 752	29 December 1944	1 January 1945	1	0 vessels lost

=== 1945 ===
Convoy	Departure Date	Arrival Date	No.of Merchant Ships	Notes
KG 753	3 January 1945	6 January 1945	2	0 vessels lost
KG 754				Cancelled
KG 755	13 January 1945	15 January 1945	3	0 vessels lost
KG 756	18 January 1945	21 January 1945	4	0 vessels lost
KG 757	23 January 1945	25 January 1945	3	0 vessels lost
KG 758	28 January 1945	31 January 1945	1	0 vessels lost
KG 759				Cancelled
KG 760	7 February 1945	9 February 1945	1	0 vessels lost
KG 761	15 February 1945	Not listed	Not listed	
KG 762	17 February 1945	20 February 1945	1	0 vessels lost
KG 763	22 February 1945	25 February 1945	2	0 vessels lost
KG 764	27 February 1945	2 March 1945	3	0 vessels lost
KG 765	4 March 1945	7 March 1945	1	0 vessels lost
KG 766	9 March 1945	12 March 1945	3	0 vessels lost
KG 767	16 March 1945	Not listed	Not listed	
KG 768	19 March 1945	22 March 1945	1	0 vessels lost
KG 769	23 March 1945	26 March 1945	2	0 vessels lost
KG 770	28 March 1945	1 April 1945	2	0 vessels lost
KG 771	3 April 1945	6 April 1945	1	0 vessels lost
KG 772	7 April 1945	10 April 1945	1	0 vessels lost
KG 773				Cancelled
KG 774	18 April 1945	Not listed	1	0 vessels lost
KG 775				Cancelled
KG 776	28 April 1945	1 May 1945	1	0 vessels lost
KG 777				Cancelled
KG 778	7 May 1945	10 May 1945	2	0 vessels lost
KG 779	13 May 1945	16 May 1945	1	0 vessels lost

== Notes ==
Citations

== Bibliography ==
Books

- Arnold Hague (2000). The Allied Convoy System 1939–1945. ISBN 1-86176-147-3.
- Rohwer, J. & Hummelchen, G. (1992). Chronology of the War at Sea 1939–1945. Naval Institute Press. ISBN 1-55750-105-X.
- Silverstone, Paul H. (1968). U.S. Warships of World War II. Doubleday and Company.

Online resources

- "KG Convoy Series". Convoy Web - Arnold Hague Convoy Database.
