= GAT convoys =

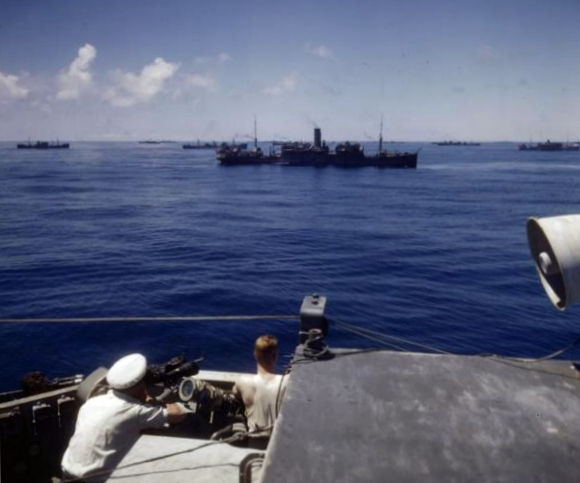
- View of a convoy during the Second World War.
- Type: GAT Convoys
- Location: Caribbean Sea
- Planned: 210
- Objective: Merchant convoys between Guantanamo Bay, Cuba, Aruba and Trinidad
- Date: August 1942 to 18 May 1945
- Casualties: 3 ships lost to U-boats

Ports of call for GAT convoys

The GAT convoys were a series of Caribbean convoys which ran during the Battle of the Atlantic in World War II.

They take their name from the route: Guantanamo, Cuba to Curaçao, Aruba and Trinidad

== Overview ==
The GAT series was the reverse of TAG series that ran from August 1942 until 18 May 1945. There were 209 GAT convoys, comprising 3,696 individual ship listings. The escort ships for these convoys are not listed in the reference cited. Some of the ships listed in a convoy did not always make the complete trip between Guantanamo and Trinidad though. Some may have traveled as far as Curaçao, others would join at Curaçao and sail on to Trinidad, while others may have left to go to Kingston, Jamaica, San Juan, Puerto Rico or Puerto Plata.

Two convoys were successfully attacked by U-boats during 1942 and 1943, in which three ships were lost.

== Convoy List ==
=== 1942 ===
Only one convoy was attacked, 6 September 1942, by U-164, which resulted in one ship being lost.

Convoy	Departure Date	Arrival Date	No.of Merchant Ships	Notes
GAT 1	31 August 1942	7 September 1942	36	0 vessels lost
GAT 2	3 September 1942	10 September 1942	29	1 vessel lost; John A. Holloway by U-164, 6 September 1942
GAT 3	6 September 1942	13 September 1942	36	0 vessels lost
GAT 4	10 September 1942	17 September 1942	21	0 vessels lost
GAT 5	12 September 1942	19 September 1942	17	0 vessels lost
GAT 6	17 September 1942	24 September 1942	22	0 vessels lost
GAT 7	20 September 1942	27 September 1942	27	0 vessels lost
GAT 8	24 September 1942	30 September 1942	29	0 vessels lost
GAT 9	27 September 1942	3 October 1942	23	0 vessels lost
GAT 10	1 October 1942	7 October 1942	15	0 vessels lost
GAT 11	4 October 1942	9 October 1942	26	0 vessels lost
GAT 12	7 October 1942	13 October 1942	15	0 vessels lost
GAT 12A	10 October 1942	Not listed	0	0 vessels lost
GAT 13	11 October 1942	17 October 1942	14	0 vessels lost
GAT 14	15 October 1942	20 October 1942	26	0 vessels lost
GAT 15	18 October 1942	23 October 1942	14	0 vessels lost
GAT 16	22 October 1942	28 October 1942	27	0 vessels lost
GAT 17	26 October 1942	1 November 1942	15	0 vessels lost
GAT 17A	29 October 1942	7 November 1942	5	0 vessels lost
GAT 18	30 October 1942	5 November 1942	31	0 vessels lost
GAT 19	3 November 1942	10 November 1942	15	0 vessels lost
GAT 20	7 November 1942	12 November 1942	25	0 vessels lost
GAT 21	11 November 1942	17 November 1942	20	0 vessels lost
GAT 22	15 November 1942	21 November 1942	32	0 vessels lost
GAT 23	19 November 1942	24 November 1942	23	0 vessels lost
GAT 24	23 November 1942	29 November 1942	18	0 vessels lost
GAT 25	27 November 1942	2 December 1942	10	0 vessels lost
GAT 26	1 December 1942	7 December 1942	21	0 vessels lost
GAT 27	6 December 1942	13 December 1942	16	0 vessels lost
GAT 28	9 December 1942	15 December 1942	10	0 vessels lost
GAT 29	13 December 1942	20 December 1942	16	0 vessels lost
GAT 30	18 December 1942	25 December 1942	30	0 vessels lost
GAT 31	21 December 1942	27 December 1942	16	0 vessels lost
GAT 32	25 December 1942	1 January 1943	16	0 vessels lost
GAT 33	29 December 1942	3 January 1943	16	0 vessels lost

=== 1943 ===
Only one convoy was attacked, 13 March 1943, by U-68, which resulted in two ships being lost.

Convoy	Departure Date	Arrival Date	No.of Merchant Ships	Notes
GAT 34	2 January 1943	9 January 1943	19	0 vessels lost
GAT 35	6 January 1943	12 January 1943	12	0 vessels lost
GAT 36	10 January 1943	16 January 1943	20	0 vessels lost
GAT 37	14 January 1943	20 January 1943	22	0 vessels lost
GAT 38	18 January 1943	24 January 1943	29	0 vessels lost
GAT 39	22 January 1943	27 January 1943	19	0 vessels lost
GAT 40	26 January 1943	1 February 1943	36	0 vessels lost
GAT 41	29 January 1943	4 February 1943	13	0 vessels lost
GAT 42	4 February 1943	10 February 1943	22	0 vessels lost
GAT 43	9 February 1943	15 February 1943	22	0 vessels lost
GAT 44	14 February 1943	19 February 1943	18	0 vessels lost
GAT 45	19 February 1943	24 February 1943	34	0 vessels lost
GAT 46	24 February 1943	2 March 1943	28	0 vessels lost
GAT 47	1 March 1943	8 March 1943	26	0 vessels lost
GAT 48	6 March 1943	12 March 1943	21	0 vessels lost
GAT 49	11 March 1943	27 March 1943	19	2 vessels lost; Ceres and Cities Service Missouri by U-68, 13 March 1943
GAT 50	16 March 1943	22 March 1943	20	0 vessels lost
GAT 51	22 March 1943	17 March 1943	14	0 vessels lost
GAT 52	26 March 1943	2 April 1943	24	0 vessels lost
GAT 53	30 March 1943	5 April 1943	20	0 vessels lost
GAT 54	4 April 1943	9 April 1943	14	0 vessels lost
GAT 55	9 April 1943	15 April 1943	34	0 vessels lost
GAT 56	13 April 1943	19 April 1943	8	0 vessels lost
GAT 57	19 April 1943	25 April 1943	35	0 vessels lost
GAT 58	24 April 1943	30 April 1943	16	0 vessels lost
GAT 59	28 April 1943	4 May 1943	27	0 vessels lost
GAT 60	4 May 1943	11 May 1943	21	0 vessels lost
GAT 61	9 May 1943	16 May 1943	27	0 vessels lost
GAT 62	15 May 1943	21 May 1943	24	0 vessels lost
GAT 63	19 May 1943	26 May 1943	22	0 vessels lost
GAT 64	25 May 1943	1 June 1943	24	0 vessels lost
GAT 65	30 May 1943	5 June 1943	38	0 vessels lost
GAT 66	3 June 1943	9 June 1943	17	0 vessels lost
GAT 67	9 June 1943	15 June 1943	19	0 vessels lost
GAT 68	13 June 1943	19 June 1943	20	0 vessels lost
GAT 69	18 June 1943	24 June 1943	24	0 vessels lost
GAT 70	22 June 1943	29 June 1943	28	0 vessels lost
GAT 71	28 June 1943	4 July 1943	22	0 vessels lost
GAT 72	3 July 1943	9 July 1943	22	0 vessels lost
GAT 73	7 July 1943	13 July 1943	11	0 vessels lost
GAT 74	13 July 1943	20 July 1943	33	0 vessels lost
GAT 75	18 July 1943	25 July 1943	16	0 vessels lost
GAT 76	23 July 1943	29 July 1943	22	0 vessels lost
GAT 77	28 July 1943	3 August 1943	18	0 vessels lost
GAT 78	2 August 1943	8 August 1943	35	0 vessels lost
GAT 79	7 August 1943	13 August 1943	19	0 vessels lost
GAT 80	12 August 1943	18 August 1943	17	0 vessels lost
GAT 81	17 August 1943	23 August 1943	22	0 vessels lost
GAT 82	22 August 1943	28 August 1943	33	0 vessels lost
GAT 83	27 August 1943	3 September 1943	15	0 vessels lost
GAT 84	2 September 1943	8 September 1943	27	0 vessels lost
GAT 85	16 September 1943	22 September 1943	20	0 vessels lost
GAT 86	12 September 1943	18 September 1943	20	0 vessels lost
GAT 87	15 September 1943	22 September 1943	18	0 vessels lost
GAT 88	23 September 1943	29 September 1943	24	0 vessels lost
GAT 89	25 September 1943	1 October 1943	19	0 vessels lost
GAT 90	1 October 1943	7 October 1943	32	0 vessels lost
GAT 91	6 October 1943	12 October 1943	17	0 vessels lost
GAT 92	11 October 1943	16 October 1943	31	0 vessels lost
GAT 93	15 October 1943	20 October 1943	17	0 vessels lost
GAT 94	21 October 1943	27 October 1943	20	0 vessels lost
GAT 95	25 October 1943	30 October 1943	20	0 vessels lost
GAT 96	1 November 1943	7 November 1943	27	0 vessels lost
GAT 97	4 November 1943	10 November 1943	19	0 vessels lost
GAT 98	11 November 1943	16 November 1943	29	0 vessels lost
GAT 99	14 November 1943	19 November 1943	18	0 vessels lost
GAT 100	20 November 1943	26 November 1943	23	0 vessels lost
GAT 101	24 November 1943	29 November 1943	23	0 vessels lost
GAT 102	30 November 1943	6 December 1943	28	0 vessels lost
GAT 103	4 December 1943	10 December 1943	16	0 vessels lost
GAT 104	9 December 1943	14 December 1943	27	0 vessels lost
GAT 105	14 December 1943	20 December 1943	33	0 vessels lost
GAT 106	20 December 1943	26 December 1943	14	0 vessels lost
GAT 107	25 December 1943	31 December 1943	26	0 vessels lost
GAT 108	29 December 1943	3 January 1944	21	0 vessels lost

=== 1944 ===
Convoy	Departure Date	Arrival Date	No.of Merchant Ships	Notes
GAT 109	4 January 1944	10 January 1944	20	0 vessels lost
GAT 110	9 January 1944	15 January 1944	18	0 vessels lost
GAT 111	14 January 1944	19 January 1944	19	0 vessels lost
GAT 112	18 January 1944	24 January 1944	24	0 vessels lost
GAT 113	23 January 1944	30 January 1944	19	0 vessels lost
GAT 114	29 January 1944	4 February 1944	18	0 vessels lost
GAT 115	3 February 1944	8 February 1944	20	0 vessels lost
GAT 116	7 February 1944	14 February 1944	24	0 vessels lost
GAT 117	13 February 1944	20 February 1944	14	0 vessels lost
GAT 118	18 February 1944	25 February 1944	21	0 vessels lost
GAT 119	23 February 1944	29 February 1944	17	0 vessels lost
GAT 120	27 February 1944	4 March 1944	18	0 vessels lost
GAT 121	4 March 1944	11 March 1944	22	0 vessels lost
GAT 122	9 March 1944	15 March 1944	20	0 vessels lost
GAT 123	14 March 1944	19 March 1944	21	0 vessels lost
GAT 124	19 March 1944	25 March 1944	22	0 vessels lost
GAT 125	24 March 1944	31 March 1944	27	0 vessels lost
GAT 126	29 March 1944	4 April 1944	19	0 vessels lost
GAT 127	2 April 1944	9 April 1944	30	0 vessels lost
GAT 128	8 April 1944	15 April 1944	21	0 vessels lost
GAT 129	14 April 1944	19 April 1944	29	0 vessels lost
GAT 130	19 April 1944	25 April 1944	12	0 vessels lost
GAT 131	23 April 1944	29 April 1944	13	0 vessels lost
GAT 132	28 April 1944	4 May 1944	33	0 vessels lost
GAT 133	2 May 1944	8 May 1944	19	0 vessels lost
GAT 134	7 May 1944	13 May 1944	27	0 vessels lost
GAT 135	12 May 1944	18 May 1944	28	0 vessels lost
GAT 136	17 May 1944	23 May 1944	19	0 vessels lost
GAT 137	22 May 1944	28 May 1944	22	0 vessels lost
GAT 138	28 May 1944	3 June 1944	19	0 vessels lost
GAT 139	2 June 1944	9 June 1944	14	0 vessels lost
GAT 140	6 June 1944	12 June 1944	22	0 vessels lost
GAT 141	11 June 1944	17 June 1944	22	0 vessels lost
GAT 142	16 June 1944	22 June 1944	32	0 vessels lost
GAT 143	21 June 1944	27 June 1944	20	0 vessels lost
GAT 144	27 June 1944	4 July 1944	22	0 vessels lost
GAT 145	2 July 1944	7 July 1944	35	0 vessels lost
GAT 146	6 July 1944	12 July 1944	25	0 vessels lost
GAT 147	12 July 1944	19 July 1944	32	0 vessels lost
GAT 148	16 July 1944	22 July 1944	24	0 vessels lost
GAT 149	22 July 1944	27 July 1944	23	0 vessels lost
GAT 150	27 July 1944	3 August 1944	31	0 vessels lost
GAT 151	1 August 1944	8 August 1944	22	0 vessels lost
GAT 152	6 August 1944	11 August 1944	34	0 vessels lost
GAT 153	11 August 1944	17 August 1944	15	0 vessels lost
GAT 154	16 August 1944	22 August 1944	9	0 vessels lost
GAT 155	21 August 1944	27 August 1944	8	0 vessels lost
GAT 156	25 August 1944	31 August 1944	13	0 vessels lost
GAT 157	31 August 1944	6 September 1944	7	0 vessels lost
GAT 158	4 September 1944	9 September 1944	17	0 vessels lost
GAT 159	9 September 1944	15 September 1944	7	0 vessels lost
GAT 160	16 September 1944	21 September 1944	4	0 vessels lost
GAT 161	21 September 1944	24 September 1944	8	0 vessels lost
GAT 162	24 September 1944	29 September 1944	4	0 vessels lost
GAT 163	29 September 1944	4 October 1944	22	0 vessels lost
GAT 164	5 October 1944	11 October 1944	5	0 vessels lost
GAT 165	10 October 1944	16 October 1944	8	0 vessels lost
GAT 166	15 October 1944	20 October 1944	4	0 vessels lost
GAT 167	20 October 1944	25 October 1944	9	0 vessels lost
GAT 168	25 October 1944	30 October 1944	2	0 vessels lost
GAT 169	30 October 1944	5 November 1944	3	0 vessels lost
GAT 170	3 November 1944	9 November 1944	4	0 vessels lost
GAT 171	9 November 1944	15 November 1944	3	0 vessels lost
GAT 172	13 November 1944	19 November 1944	7	0 vessels lost
GAT 173	18 November 1944	23 November 1944	2	0 vessels lost
GAT 174	24 November 1944	1 December 1944	4	0 vessels lost
GAT 175	28 November 1944	4 December 1944	4	0 vessels lost
GAT 176				Cancelled
GAT 177	9 December 1944	15 December 1944	5	0 vessels lost
GAT 178	14 December 1944	not recorded	2	0 vessels lost
GAT 179	20 December 1944	28 December 1944	2	0 vessels lost
GAT 180	24 December 1944	29 December 1944	2	0 vessels lost
GAT 181	29 December 1944	4 January 1945	4	0 vessels lost

=== 1945 ===
Convoy	Departure Date	Arrival Date	No.of Merchant Ships	Notes
GAT 182	3 January 1945	9 January 1945	2	0 vessels lost
GAT 183	8 January 1945	13 January 1945	6	0 vessels lost
GAT 184	17 January 1945	19 January 1945	4	0 vessels lost
GAT 185	18 January 1945	23 January 1945	3	0 vessels lost
GAT 186	23 January 1945	29 January 1945	5	0 vessels lost
GAT 187	28 January 1945	3 February 1945	3	0 vessels lost
GAT 188	1 February 1945	8 February 1945	4	0 vessels lost
GAT 189	7 February 1945	13 February 1945	6	0 vessels lost
GAT 190	12 February 1945	18 February 1945	3	0 vessels lost
GAT 191	17 February 1945	23 February 1945	6	0 vessels lost
GAT 192	23 February 1945	28 February 1945	3	0 vessels lost
GAT 193	28 February 1945	8 March 1945	3	0 vessels lost
GAT 194	4 March 1945	10 March 1945	2	0 vessels lost
GAT 195	9 March 1945	16 March 1945	3	0 vessels lost
GAT 196	14 March 1945	20 March 1945	5	0 vessels lost
GAT 197	19 March 1945	25 March 1945	1	0 vessels lost
GAT 198	24 March 1945	30 March 1945	4	0 vessels lost
GAT 199	29 March 1945	5 April 1945	5	0 vessels lost
GAT 200	2 April 1945	8 April 1945	8	0 vessels lost
GAT 201	8 April 1945	14 April 1945	3	0 vessels lost
GAT 202	13 April 1945	19 April 1945	5	0 vessels lost
GAT 203	17 April 1945	23 April 1945	2	0 vessels lost
GAT 204	23 April 1945	28 April 1945	6	0 vessels lost
GAT 205	28 April 1945	4 May 1945	4	0 vessels lost
GAT 206	2 May 1945	9 May 1945	5	0 vessels lost
GAT 207	8 May 1945	14 May 1945	5	0 vessels lost
GAT 208	13 May 1945	18 May 1945	10	0 vessels lost

== Notes ==
Citations

== Bibliography ==
Books

- Arnold Hague (2000). The Allied Convoy System 1939–1945. Chatham. ISBN 1-86176-147-3.
- Rohwer, J. & Hummelchen, G. (1992). Chronology of the War at Sea 1939–1945. Naval Institute Press. ISBN 1-55750-105-X.
- Silverstone, Paul H. (1968). U.S. Warships of World War II. Doubleday and Company.

Online resources

- "GAT Convoy Series". Convoy Web - Arnold Hague Convoy Database.
