= GK convoys =

Series of Caribbean convoys

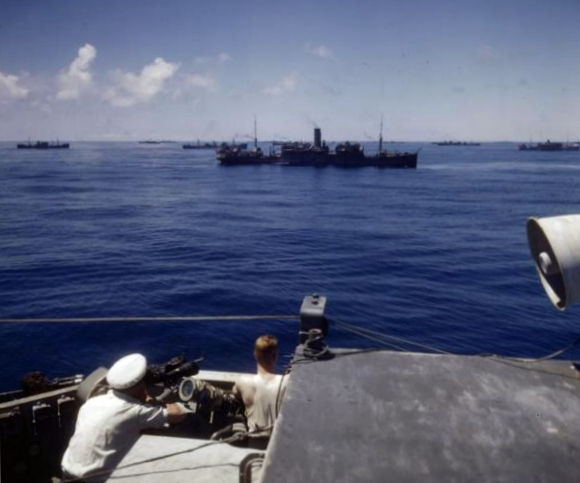
- View of a convoy during the Second World War.
- Type: GK Convoys
- Location: Caribbean Sea
- Planned: 179
- Objective: Merchant convoys between Guantanamo Bay, Cuba, and Key West, Florida
- Date: September 1942 to May 1945

Ports of call for GK convoys

The GK convoys were a series of Caribbean convoys which ran during the Battle of the Atlantic in World War II.

They take their name from the route: Guantanamo, Cuba to Key West, Florida

== Overview ==
The GK series was the reverse of KG series that ran from 1 September 1942 until 6 May 1945. There were 163 "GK" convoys, comprising 1,064 individual ship listings. The escort ships for these convoys are not listed in the reference cited. Almost all ships listed in a convoy made the complete trip between Guantanamo and Key West. Only two are listed as going to Port Everglades, Florida, and one to Mayport, Florida.

The series started with GK 700 through GK 878 with 16 convoys cancelled and no record available for the last convoy, GK 878. There are also no ships listed as being lost.

== Convoy List ==
=== 1942 ===
Convoy	Departure Date	Arrival Date	No.of Merchant Ships	Notes
GK 700	1 September 1942	5 September 1942	12	0 vessels lost
GK 701	6 September 1942	9 September 1942	7	0 vessels lost
GK 702	9 September 1942	12 September 1942	3	0 vessels lost
GK 703	14 September 1942	17 September 1942	12	0 vessels lost
GK 704	17 September 1942	20 September 1942	4	0 vessels lost
GK 705	21 September 1942	25 September 1942	10	0 vessels lost
GK 706	24 September 1942	27 September 1942	6	0 vessels lost
GK 707	28 September 1942	Not listed	8	0 vessels lost
GK 708				Cancelled
GK 709	11 October 1942	14 October 1942	19	0 vessels lost
GK 710	19 October 1942	22 October 1942	7	0 vessels lost
GK 711	27 October 1942	30 October 1942	8	0 vessels lost
GK 712	4 November 1942	7 November 1942	17	0 vessels lost
GK 713	12 November 1942	15 November 1942	8	0 vessels lost
GK 714	20 November 1942	23 November 1942	5	0 vessels lost
GK 715	28 November 1942	1 December 1942	10	0 vessels lost
GK 716	6 December 1942	10 December 1942	20	0 vessels lost
GK 717	14 December 1942	17 December 1942	10	0 vessels lost
GK 718	22 December 1942	25 December 1942	7	0 vessels lost
GK 719	30 December 1942	2 January 1943	5	0 vessels lost

=== 1943 ===
Convoy	Departure Date	Arrival Date	No.of Merchant Ships	Notes
GK 720	7 January 1943	10 January 1943	5	0 vessels lost
GK 721	15 January 1943	18 January 1943	2	0 vessels lost
GK 722	23 January 1943	26 January 1943	10	0 vessels lost
GK 723	2 February 1943	8 February 1943	13	0 vessels lost
GK 724	13 February 1943	16 February 1943	7	0 vessels lost
GK 725	23 February 1943	26 February 1943	12	0 vessels lost
GK 726	5 March 1943	8 March 1943	9	0 vessels lost
GK 727	16 March 1943	19 March 1943	11	0 vessels lost
GK 728	27 March 1943	31 March 1943	11	0 vessels lost
GK 729	30 March 1943	2 April 1943	9	0 vessels lost
GK 730	9 April 1943	12 April 1943	19	0 vessels lost
GK 731	19 April 1943	22 April 1943	9	0 vessels lost
GK 732	29 April 1943	4 May 1943	8	0 vessels lost
GK 733	10 May 1943	13 May 1943	8	0 vessels lost
GK 734	19 May 1943	22 May 1943	13	0 vessels lost
GK 735	24 May 1943	27 May 1943	1	0 vessels lost
GK 736	30 May 1943	1 June 1943	6	0 vessels lost
GK 737	4 June 1943	7 June 1943	8	0 vessels lost
GK 738	9 June 1943	12 June 1943	6	0 vessels lost
GK 739	14 June 1943	17 June 1943	6	0 vessels lost
GK 740	19 June 1943	22 June 1943	15	0 vessels lost
GK 741	24 June 1943	27 June 1943	11	0 vessels lost
GK 742	29 June 1943	2 July 1943	15	0 vessels lost
GK 743	4 July 1943	7 July 1943	7	0 vessels lost
GK 744	9 July 1943	12 July 1943	8	0 vessels lost
GK 745	14 July 1943	17 July 1943	7	0 vessels lost
GK 746	19 July 1943	22 July 1943	9	0 vessels lost
GK 747	24 July 1943	27 July 1943	6	0 vessels lost
GK 748	29 July 1943	1 August 1943	7	0 vessels lost
GK 749	3 August 1943	6 August 1943	5	0 vessels lost
GK 750	8 August 1943	11 August 1943	4	0 vessels lost
GK 751	13 August 1943	16 August 1943	7	0 vessels lost
GK 752	18 August 1943	21 August 1943	7	0 vessels lost
GK 753	23 August 1943	26 August 1943	12	0 vessels lost
GK 754	28 August 1943	31 August 1943	15	0 vessels lost
GK 755	2 September 1943	5 September 1943	10	0 vessels lost
GK 756	7 September 1943	10 September 1943	13	0 vessels lost
GK 757	12 September 1943	15 September 1943	11	0 vessels lost
GK 758	17 September 1943	20 September 1943	8	0 vessels lost
GK 759	22 September 1943	25 September 1943	12	0 vessels lost
GK 760	27 September 1943	30 September 1943	7	0 vessels lost
GK 761	2 October 1943	5 October 1943	16	0 vessels lost
GK 762	7 October 1943	10 October 1943	5	0 vessels lost
GK 763	12 October 1943	15 October 1943	16	0 vessels lost
GK 764	17 October 1943	20 October 1943	1	0 vessels lost
GK 765	22 October 1943	25 October 1943	12	0 vessels lost
GK 766	28 October 1943	31 October 1943	7	0 vessels lost
GK 767	1 November 1943	4 November 1943	9	0 vessels lost
GK 768	6 November 1943	9 November 1943	8	0 vessels lost
GK 769	11 November 1943	14 November 1943	7	0 vessels lost
GK 770	16 November 1943	19 November 1943	6	0 vessels lost
GK 771	21 November 1943	24 November 1943	4	0 vessels lost
GK 772	26 November 1943	29 November 1943	10	0 vessels lost
GK 773	1 December 1943	4 December 1943	13	0 vessels lost
GK 774	6 December 1943	9 December 1943	16	0 vessels lost
GK 775	11 December 1943	14 December 1943	11	0 vessels lost
GK 776	15 December 1943	18 December 1943	15	0 vessels lost
GK 777	20 December 1943	23 December 1943	7	0 vessels lost
GK 778	25 December 1943	28 December 1943	10	0 vessels lost
GK 779	31 December 1943	2 January 1944	1	0 vessels lost

=== 1944 ===
Convoy	Departure Date	Arrival Date	No.of Merchant Ships	Notes
GK 780	5 January 1944	8 January 1944	8	0 vessels lost
GK 781	10 January 1944	13 January 1944	7	0 vessels lost
GK 782	15 January 1944	18 January 1944	8	0 vessels lost
GK 783	20 January 1944	23 January 1944	2	0 vessels lost
GK 784	25 January 1944	28 January 1944	9	0 vessels lost
GK 785	30 January 1944	1 February 1944	6	0 vessels lost
GK 786	4 February 1944	7 February 1944	12	0 vessels lost
GK 787	9 February 1944	12 February 1944	3	0 vessels lost
GK 788	14 February 1944	17 February 1944	9	0 vessels lost
GK 789	19 February 1944	22 February 1944	9	0 vessels lost
GK 790	24 February 1944	27 February 1944	14	0 vessels lost
GK 791	29 February 1944	3 March 1944	8	0 vessels lost
GK 792	5 March 1944	8 March 1944	11	0 vessels lost
GK 793	10 March 1944	13 March 1944	7	0 vessels lost
GK 794	15 March 1944	18 March 1944	8	0 vessels lost
GK 795	20 March 1944	23 March 1944	2	0 vessels lost
GK 796	25 March 1944	28 March 1944	12	0 vessels lost
GK 797	29 March 1944	1 April 1944	2	0 vessels lost
GK 798	4 April 1944	7 April 1944	6	0 vessels lost
GK 799	9 April 1944	11 April 1944	3	0 vessels lost
GK 800	14 April 1944	17 April 1944	12	0 vessels lost
GK 801	19 April 1944	21 April 1944	9	0 vessels lost
GK 802	24 April 1944	27 April 1944	7	0 vessels lost
GK 803	29 April 1944	1 May 1944	3	0 vessels lost
GK 804	4 May 1944	6 May 1944	7	0 vessels lost
GK 805	9 May 1944	12 May 1944	12	0 vessels lost
GK 806	14 May 1944	17 May 1944	5	0 vessels lost
GK 807	19 May 1944	22 May 1944	3	0 vessels lost
GK 808	24 May 1944	27 May 1944	5	0 vessels lost
GK 809	29 May 1944	1 June 1944	5	0 vessels lost
GK 810	3 June 1944	6 June 1944	3	0 vessels lost
GK 811	8 June 1944	11 June 1944	7	0 vessels lost
GK 812	13 June 1944	16 June 1944	6	0 vessels lost
GK 813	18 June 1944	21 June 1944	10	0 vessels lost
GK 814	23 June 1944	26 June 1944	3	0 vessels lost
GK 815				Cancelled
GK 816	3 July 1944	Not listed	3	0 vessels lost
GK 817	8 July 1944	Not listed	1	0 vessels lost
GK 818	12 July 1944	Not listed	2	0 vessels lost
GK 819	18 July 1944	21 July 1944	5	0 vessels lost
GK 820	23 July 1944	26 July 1944	3	0 vessels lost
GK 821	28 July 1944	Not listed	1	0 vessels lost
GK 822	1 August 1944	4 August 1944	2	0 vessels lost
GK 823	7 August 1944	Not listed	Not listed	0 vessels lost
GK 824	11 August 1944	14 August 1944	1	0 vessels lost
GK 825	17 August 1944	20 August 1944	3	0 vessels lost
GK 826				Cancelled
GK 827	26 August 1944	29 August 1944	1	0 vessels lost
GK 828	31 August 1944	3 September 1944	3	0 vessels lost
GK 829	5 September 1944	8 September 1944	1	0 vessels lost
GK 830				Cancelled
GK 831	16 September 1944	19 September 1944	5	0 vessels lost
GK 832	21 September 1944	24 September 1944	2	0 vessels lost
GK 833	25 September 1944	28 September 1944	1	0 vessels lost
GK 834	30 September 1944	3 October 1944	1	0 vessels lost
GK 835	5 October 1944	8 October 1944	Not listed	0 vessels lost
GK 836	10 October 1944	13 October 1944	1	0 vessels lost
GK 837				Cancelled
GK 838	21 October 1944	23 October 1944	1	0 vessels lost
GK 839	25 October 1944	28 October 1944	1	0 vessels lost
GK 840	30 October 1944	3 November 1944	3	0 vessels lost
GK 841	4 November 1944	7 November 1944	5	0 vessels lost
GK 842	9 November 1944	12 November 1944	2	0 vessels lost
GK 843				Cancelled
GK 844	20 November 1944	23 November 1944	1	0 vessels lost
GK 845	25 November 1944	28 November 1944	3	0 vessels lost
GK 846	29 November 1944	Not listed	2	0 vessels lost
GK 847	4 December 1944	7 December 1944	2	0 vessels lost
GK 848				Cancelled
GK 849	14 December 1944	17 December 1944	2	0 vessels lost
GK 850	20 December 1944	22 December 1944	2	0 vessels lost
GK 851	24 December 1944	27 December 1944	4	0 vessels lost
GK 852	30 December 1944	2 January 1945	2	0 vessels lost

=== 1945 ===
Convoy	Departure Date	Arrival Date	No.of Merchant Ships	Notes
GK 853				Cancelled
GK 854				Cancelled
GK 855				Cancelled
GK 856	18 January 1945	21 January 1945	4	0 vessels lost
GK 857	23 January 1945	Not listed	1	0 vessels lost
GK 858	29 January 1945	1 February 1945	3	0 vessels lost
GK 859	2 February 1945	Not listed	4	0 vessels lost
GK 860				Cancelled
GK 861	12 February 1945	15 February 1945	1	0 vessels lost
GK 862	17 February 1945	20 February 1945	2	0 vessels lost
GK 863				Cancelled
GK 864	28 February 1945	3 March 1945	3	0 vessels lost
GK 865	4 March 1945	7 March 1945	2	0 vessels lost
GK 866	9 March 1945	12 March 1945	2	0 vessels lost
GK 867	14 March 1945	20 March 1945	1	0 vessels lost
GK 868	19 March 1945	22 March 1945	2	0 vessels lost
GK 869				Cancelled
GK 870	29 March 1945	1 April 1945	2	0 vessels lost
GK 871				Cancelled
GK 872				Cancelled
GK 873	13 April 1945	16 April 1945	2	0 vessels lost
GK 874	19 April 1945	21 April 1945	1	0 vessels lost
GK 875	23 April 1945	26 April 1945	1	0 vessels lost
GK 876	28 April 1945	1 May 1945	1	0 vessels lost
GK 877	3 May 1945	6 May 1945	1	0 vessels lost
GK 878	No records			

== Notes ==
Citations

== Bibliography ==
Books

- Arnold Hague (2000). The Allied Convoy System 1939–1945. Chatham. ISBN 1-86176-147-3.
- Rohwer, J. & Hummelchen, G. (1992). Chronology of the War at Sea 1939–1945. Naval Institute Press. ISBN 1-55750-105-X.
- Silverstone, Paul H. (1968). U.S. Warships of World War II. Doubleday and Company.

Online resources

- "GK Convoy Series". Convoy Web - Arnold Hague Convoy Database.
