= 832 Naval Air Squadron =

Inactive flying squadron of the Royal Navy's Fleet Air Arm

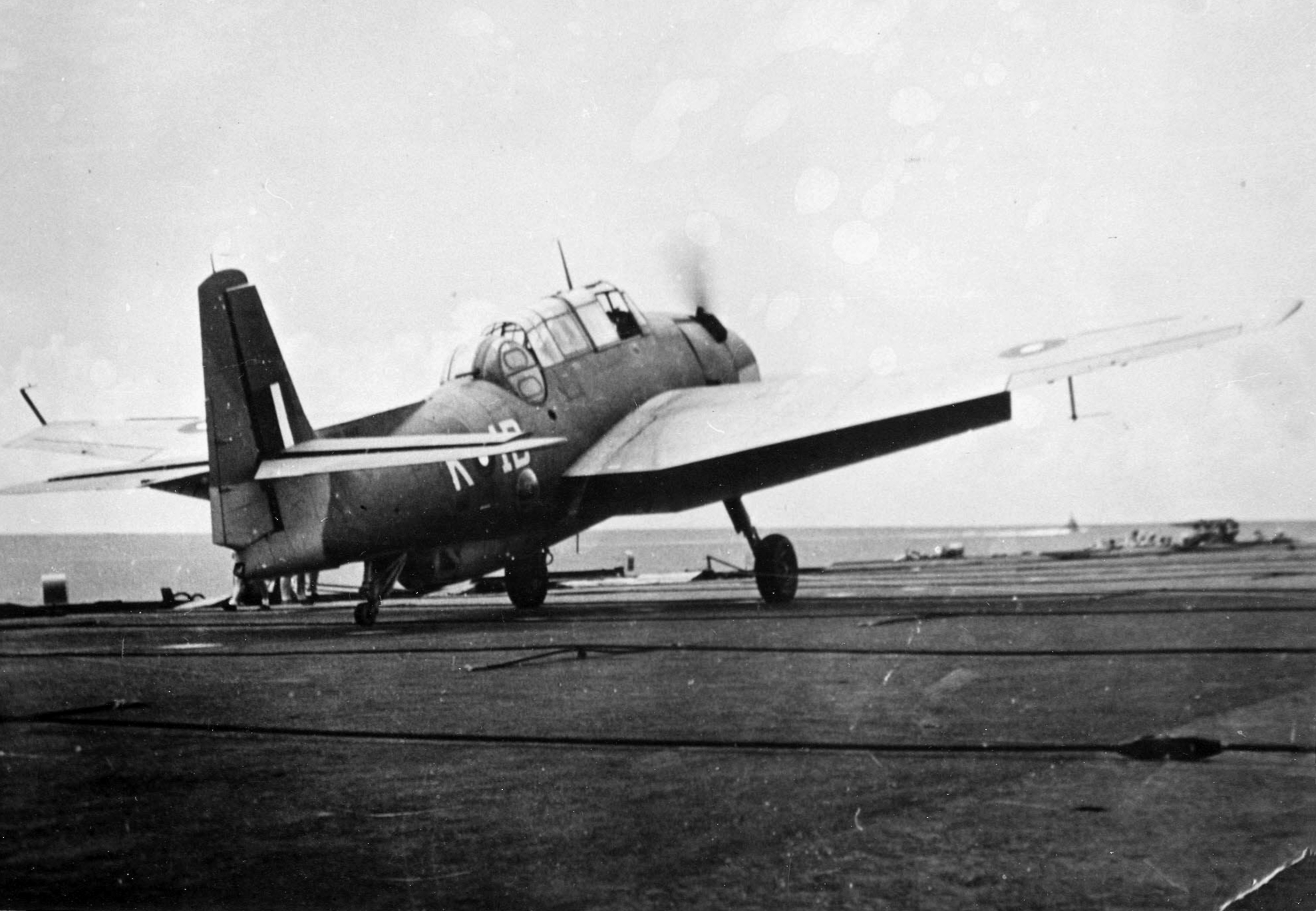
- A Royal Navy Grumman Avenger from 832 NAS, on an aircraft carrier
- Active: 1941–1945
- Disbanded: 21 February 1945
- Country: United Kingdom
- Branch: Royal Navy
- Type: Torpedo Bomber Reconnaissance squadron
- Role: Carrier-based: anti-submarine warfare (ASW); anti-surface warfare (ASuW); Maritime patrol; Combat air patrol (CAP)
- Part of: Fleet Air Arm
- Engagements: World War II: Arctic convoys of World War II; Operation Pedestal; Operation Torch; Indian Ocean in World War II
- Battle honours: Arctic 1942; Malta Convoys 1942; North Africa 1942; East Indies 1944

Insignia
- Identification Markings: 4A+ (Albacore and Avenger); single letters (Wildcat)

Aircraft flown
- Bomber: Fairey Albacore; Grumman Avenger
- Fighter: Grumman Wildcat

832 Naval Air Squadron (832 NAS), also referred to as 832 Squadron, is an inactive Fleet Air Arm (FAA) naval air squadron of the United Kingdom's Royal Navy (RN). It was last active during World War II and it most recently operated with Grumman Avenger torpedo bomber between September 1943 and January 1945 and also flew Grumman Wildcat fighter aircraft for combat air patrol (CAP) between January and November 1944.

The squadron was established as a Torpedo, Spotter, Reconnaissance (TSR) unit at HMS Daedalus, RNAS Lee-on-Solent, in April 1941. It embarked on the aircraft carrier HMS Victorious in August, utilising HMS Sparrowhawk, RNAS Hatston, as a base for operations in Norway. The carrier operated near Iceland in November 1941 and February 1942 and subsequently, it escorted Arctic convoys from March to July, with the exception of an unsuccessful attack on the German battleship Tirpitz. The squadron disembarked to HMS Jackdaw, RNAS Crail, in August, after providing escort for the fast Malta convoy, Operation Pedestal. Operations continued until the squadron re-embarked in October 1942 for the North African landings, Operation Torch, while leaving a flight behind for mine-laying and anti-shipping missions at RAF Manston.

In January 1943, while visiting the USA aboard HMS Victorious, the squadron re-equipped with ex-United States Navy Avenger TBF-1 aircraft and transited the Panama Canal to the Pacific. Operations were conducted from HMS Victorious in the Coral Sea in May 1943, before briefly transferring to the USS Saratoga in June to support landings in the Solomons. The squadron re-embarked in HMS Victorious in July 1943 and returned home.

In February 1944, it journeyed to Ceylon, disembarking at the airfield HMS Ukussa, RNAS Katukurunda, in April and embarked in the aircraft carrier HMS Illustrious in May for a bombing raid on Surabaya. Maintaining HMS Ukussa as a shore base, the squadron then embarked in the escort carrier HMS Begum, in May, for six months, providing cover for Allied shipping, before returning home and disbanding early 1945.

Notably, the officers of the squadron are acknowledged for creating the naval adaptation of British battledress at their own expense, tackling the difficulties presented by conventional uniforms in the demanding environment of open cockpit aviation.

== History ==
=== Torpedo, spotter, reconnaissance squadron (1941–1945) ===
832 Naval Air Squadron was formed at RNAS Lee-on-Solent (HMS Daedalus), Hampshire, on 1 April 1941, as a Torpedo Spotter Reconnaissance squadron, initially equipped with twelve Fairey Albacore biplane torpedo bomber aircraft, under the command of Lieutenant Commander A.J.P. Plugge, RN.

In August, the squadron embarked in the Illustrious-class aircraft carrier, HMS Victorious and utilised the airbase RNAS Hatston (HMS Sparrowhawk), Mainland, Orkney, as a shore base for operations off Norway. On 12 September, they conducted attacks on shipping near the Lofoten Islands, followed by similar operations in the Bodø area the next month. The ship then traveled to Iceland in November, returning to the region in February 1942, during which the commanding officer was lost while searching for enemy naval units in adverse weather off Norway.

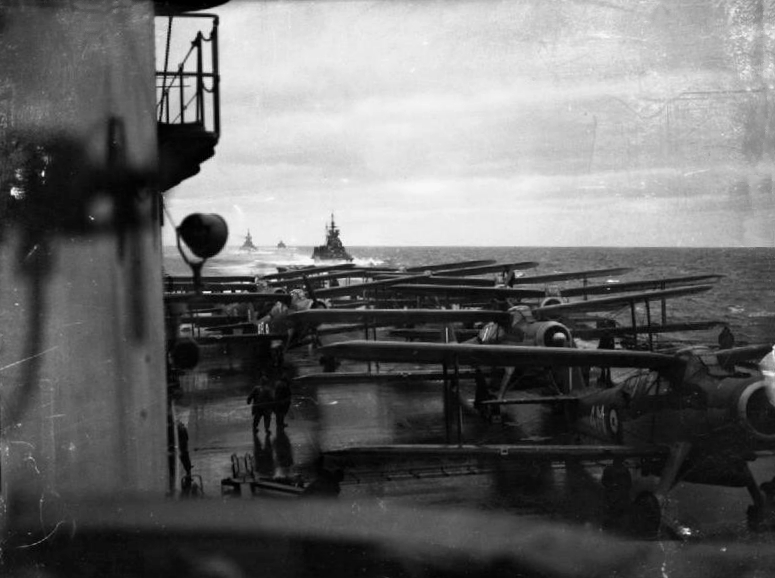
Fairey Albacores loaded with torpedoes to strike at the Tirpitz, on the flight deck of HMS Victorious

The officers of the squadron are recognised for developing the naval adaptation of British battledress at their own cost, addressing the challenges posed by the wear and tear of traditional uniforms in the demanding environment of open cockpit flying. After escorting a North Russian convoy in March, the squadron took part in an unsuccessful assault on the German battleship Tirpitz before resuming its duties with North Russian convoys. This mission concluded in July when the ship was assigned to escort a fast Malta convoy as part of Operation Pedestal.

Operations were carried out from RNAS Crail (HMS Jackdaw), Fife and RNAS Machrihanish (HMS Landrail), Argyll and Bute, until October 1942, when 832 Naval Air Squadron re-embarked for the North African landings, known as Operation Torch. During this transition, a contingent was left behind at the Royal Air Force (RAF) station at Manston, Kent, to continue mine-laying and anti-shipping missions.

During this time, the squadron conducted attacks on forts in Algiers and engaged in anti-submarine patrols before reuniting with the sub-Flight. In December, the squadron re-embarked for the United States as the aircraft carrier was temporarily transferred to the United States Navy (USN). It had lost the USS Hornet and the USS Enterprise had sustained significant damage during the Battle of the Santa Cruz Islands, resulting in the USN having only one operational fleet carrier, the USS Saratoga, in the Pacific theater. In response to a request for additional carrier support, the Royal Navy aircraft carrier HMS Victorious was loaned to the USN in late December 1942.

Subsequently the squadron was rearmed in January 1943 with the United States Navy's Avenger TBF-1, an American, Wright R-2600 Twin Cyclone engined, torpedo bomber, becoming the first FAA squadron to operate this aircraft type. After navigating through the Panama Canal to the Pacific, the squadron underwent an intensive training program in Hawaii, logging 1,500 flight hours over six weeks. The carrier then joined with the USS Saratoga for an unsuccessful mission to locate a Japanese fleet in the Coral Sea in May, before the squadron transferred to the USS Saratoga the following month to support the United States Marine Corps landings in the Solomon Islands.

In July 1943, the squadron re-embarked in the aircraft carrier HMS Victorious, setting course for home via Pearl Harbor and the Panama Canal. Upon arrival in September, it underwent re-equipment with Grumman Avenger Mk I at RNAS Hatston (HMS Sparrowhawk). In January 1944, the squadron received four Grumman Wildcat Mk V fighter aircraft from 1832 Naval Air Squadron, and by February, it had embarked in the aircraft transport ship HMS Athene and HMS Engadine, a seaplane depot ship, heading to Ceylon. The squadron disembarked at RNAS Katukurunda (HMS Ukussa), Ceylon, on 15 April 1944.

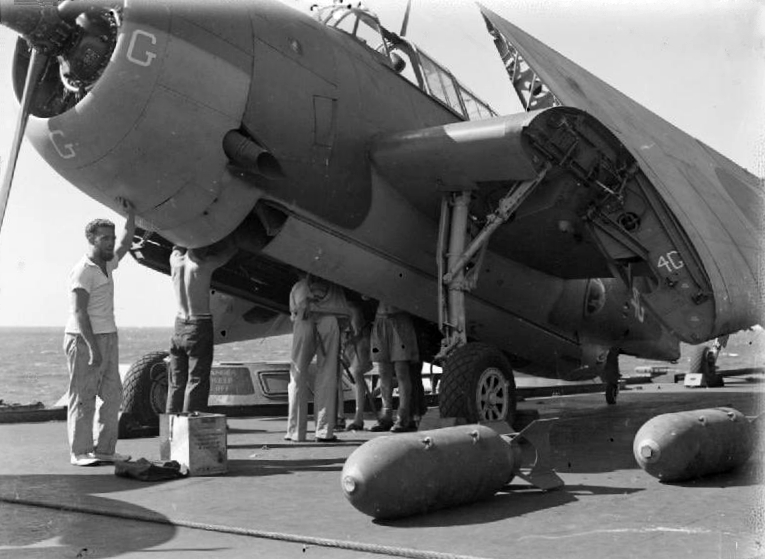
Avenger being armed on HMS Illustrious, prior to the raid on Soerabaya

On 17 May, four additional Grumman Wildcat fighters were transferred from 809 Naval Air Squadron to support 832 Naval Air Squadron, which was deployed aboard the lead ship of her class, HMS Illustrious, for a bombing mission targeting Surabaya. The squadron maintained RNAS Katukurunda as its shore base before embarking in the Ruler-class escort carrier, HMS Begum, on 26 May, for a six-month mission to provide protection for Allied shipping. By October 1944, the squadron's operational strength was reduced to nine aircraft. The Wildcat Flight departed in November. The escort carrier and its squadron set sail for the United Kingdom at the beginning of the New Year, and the squadron was disbanded upon their arrival on 21 February 1945.

== Aircraft operated ==
The squadron has operated three different aircraft types:

- Fairey Albacore torpedo bomber (April 1941 – January 1943)
- Grumman Avenger TBF-1 torpedo bomber (January – September 1943)
- Grumman Avenger Mk I torpedo bomber (September 1943 – January 1945)
- Grumman Wildcat Mk V fighter aircraft (January – November 1944)

== Battle honours ==
The Battle Honours awarded to 832 Naval Air Squadron are:

- Arctic 1942
- Malta Convoys 1942
- North Africa 1942
- East Indies 1944

== Naval air stations ==
832 Naval Air Squadron operated from a number of naval air stations of the Royal Navy, and Royal Air Force stations in the UK and overseas, and also a number of Royal Navy escort carriers:

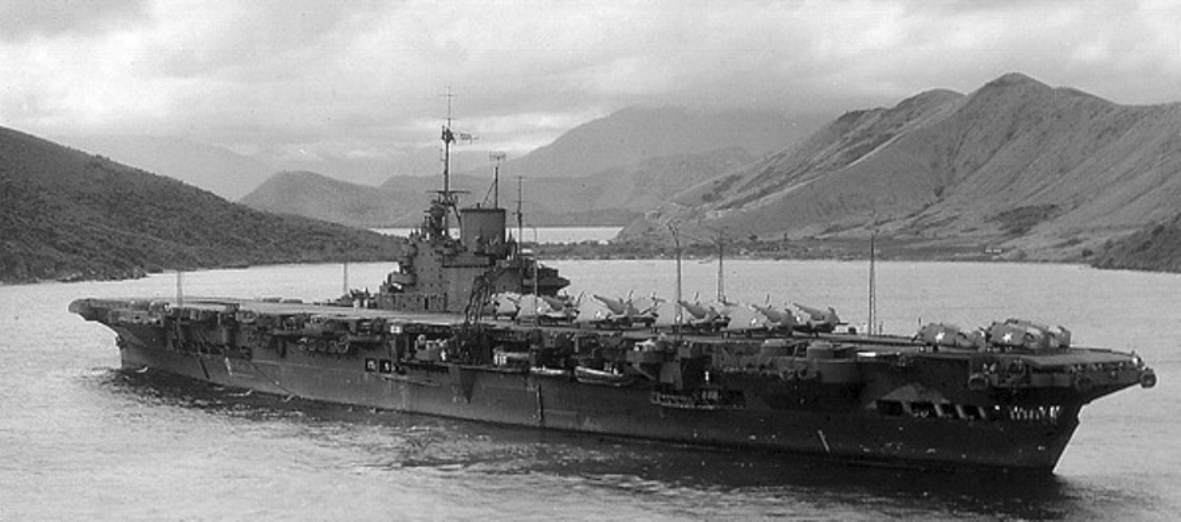
HMS Victorious at Noumea in 1943

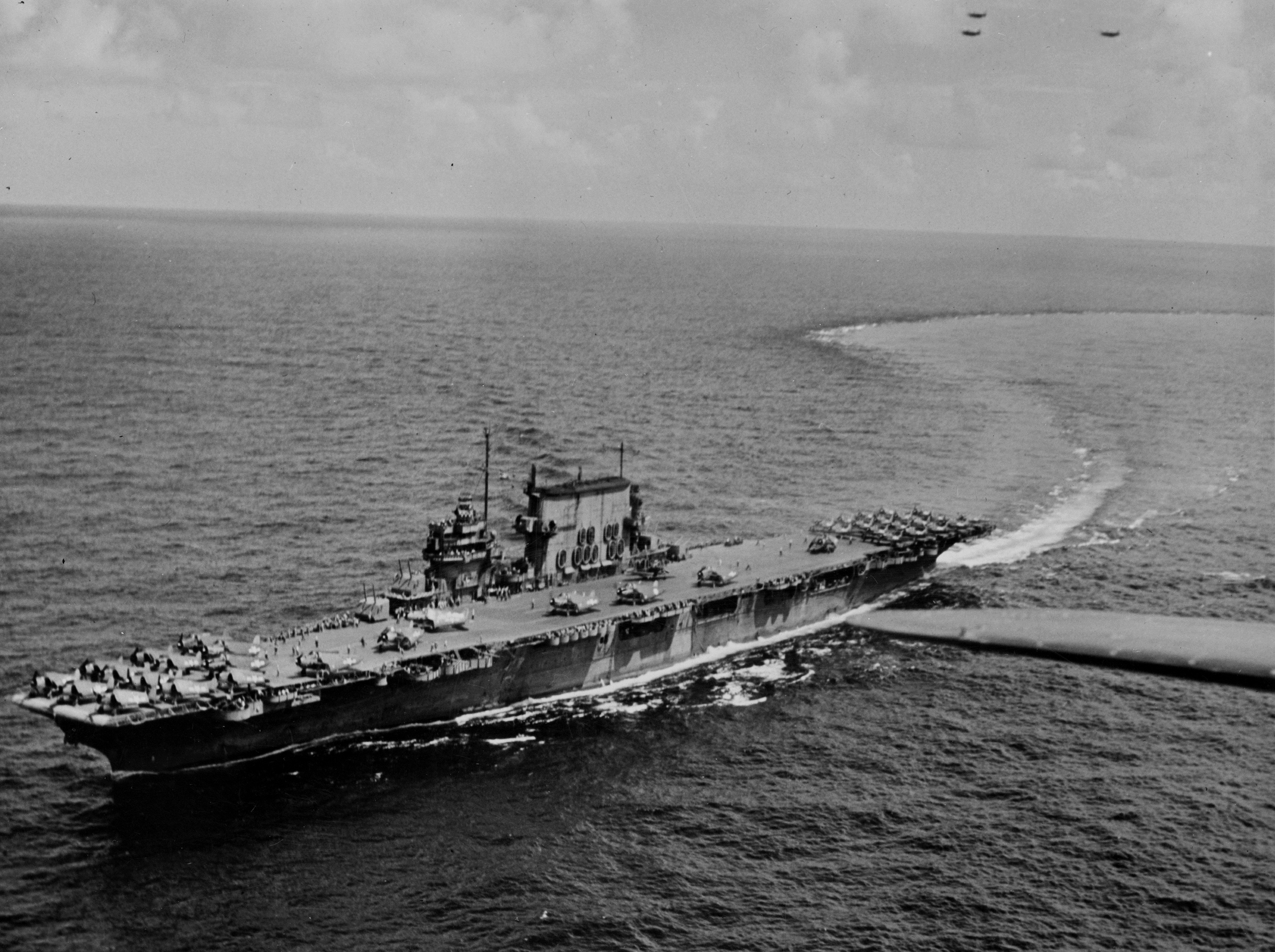
USS Saratoga

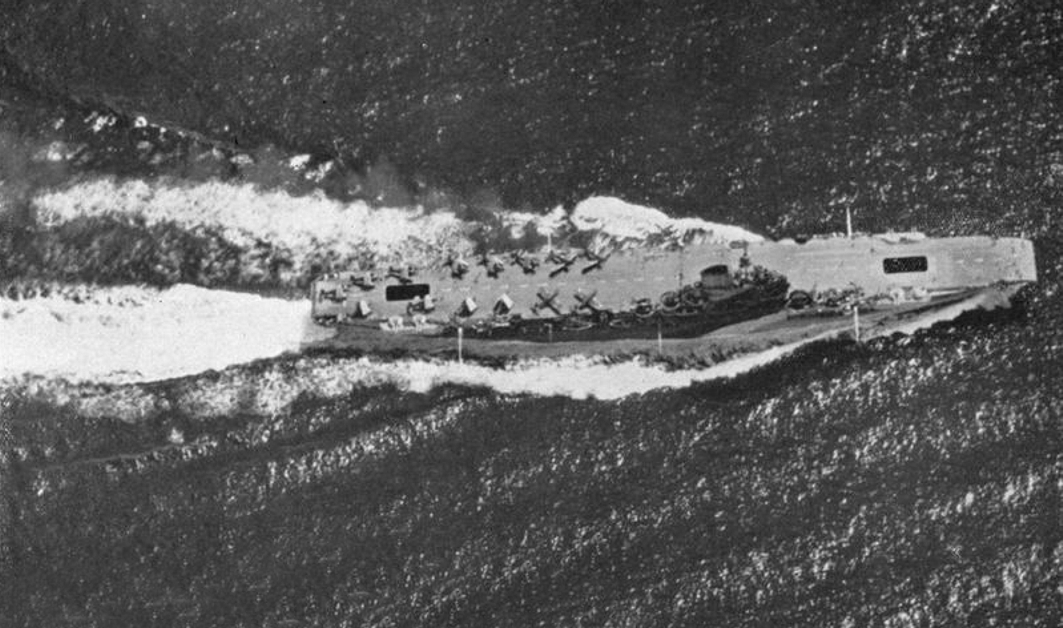
HMS Illustrious underway in the Indian Ocean, between March and May 1944

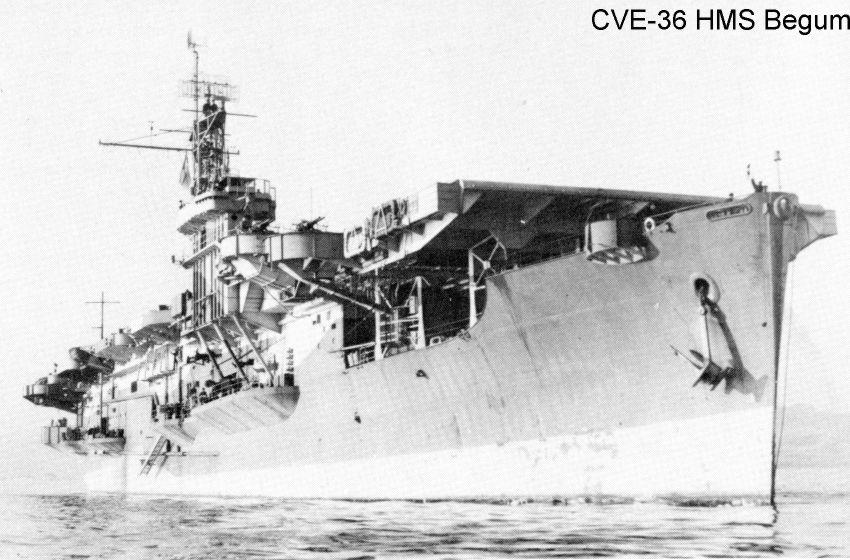
HMS Begum

- Royal Naval Air Station Lee-on-Solent (HMS Daedalus), Hampshire, (1 April - 25 May 1941)
- Royal Naval Air Station Campbeltown (HMS Landrail), Argyll and Bute, (29 May - 16 June 1941)
- Royal Naval Air Station Strabane (Machrihanish) (HMS Landrail), Argyll and Bute, (16 June - 14 August 1941)
- HMS Victorious (14 August - 26 October 1941)
  - Royal Naval Air Station Twatt (HMS Tern), Mainland, Orkney, (Detachment six aircraft 20 - 23 September 1941)
- Royal Naval Air Station Hatston (HMS Sparrowhawk), Mainland, Orkney, (26 October - 3 November 1941)
- HMS Victorious (3 November - 23 December 1941)
  - Royal Naval Air Station Hatston (HMS Sparrowhawk), Mainland, Orkney, (Detachment six aircraft 3 - 22 December 1941)
- HMS Victorious (23 December 1941 - 24 February 1942)
- Royal Naval Air Station Hatston (HMS Sparrowhawk), Mainland, Orkney, (24 February - 4 March 1942)
- HMS Victorious (4 - 11 March 1942)
- Royal Naval Air Station Hatston (HMS Sparrowhawk), Mainland, Orkney, (11 - 19 March 1942)
- HMS Victorious (19 March - 9 April 1942)
- Royal Naval Air Station Hatston (HMS Sparrowhawk), Mainland, Orkney, (9 - 12 April 1942)
- HMS Victorious (12 - 18 April 1942)
- Royal Naval Air Station Hatston (HMS Sparrowhawk), Mainland, Orkney, (18 - 21 April 1942)
- HMS Victorious (21 April - 6 May 1942)
- Royal Naval Air Station Hatston (HMS Sparrowhawk), Mainland, Orkney, (6 - 12 May 1942)
- HMS Victorious (12 May - 8 June 1942)
- Royal Air Force Reykjavik, Iceland, (8 - 14 June 1942)
- HMS Victorious (14 - 16 June 1942)
- Royal Naval Air Station Hatston (HMS Sparrowhawk), Mainland, Orkney, 16 - 29 June 1942)
- HMS Victorious (29 June 1942)
- Royal Naval Air Station Hatston (HMS Sparrowhawk), Mainland, Orkney, (7 - 30 July 1942)
- HMS Victorious (30 July - 21 August 1942)
- Royal Naval Air Station Crail (HMS Jackdaw), Fife, (21 August - 10 September 1942)
- Royal Naval Air Station Machrihanish (HMS Landrail), Argyll and Bute, (10 - 20 September 1942)
- Royal Naval Air Station Crail (HMS Jackdaw), Fife, (20 - 24 September 1942)
  - Royal Air Force Manston, Kent, (Detachment three aircraft 23 September - 22 November 1942)
- Royal Naval Air Station Machrihanish (HMS Landrail), Argyll and Bute, (24 September - 19 October 1942)
- HMS Victorious (19 October - 22 November 1942)
- Royal Naval Air Station Crail (HMS Jackdaw), Fife, (22 November - 8 December 1942)
- Royal Naval Air Station Machrihanish (HMS Landrail), Argyll and Bute, (8 - 11 December 1942)
- HMS Victorious (11 December 1942 - 1 January 1943)
- RN Air Section Norfolk, Virginia, (1 January - 1 February 1943)
  - USS Charger (Deck Landing Training (DLT) 17 - 20 January 1943)
- HMS Victorious (1 February - 4 March 1943)
- Naval Air Station Ford Island, Hawaii, (4 March - 7 May 1943)
- HMS Victorious (7 May - 4 June 1943)
- Tontouta Air Base, New Caledonia, (4 - 16 June 1943)
- HMS Victorious (16 - 27 June 1943)
  - Tontouta Air Base, New Caledonia, (Detachment six aircraft 20 - 27 June 1943)
- USS Saratoga (27 June - 24 July 1943)
- HMS Victorious (24 July - 1 September 1943)
- RN Air Section Norfolk (aircraft), Virginia, (1 September 1943)
- Philadelphia, Pennsylvania, (new aircraft) (1 - 11 September 1943)
- RN Air Section Norfolk, Virginia, (11 - 14 September 1943)
- Royal Naval Air Station Machrihanish (HMS Landrail), Argyll and Bute, (26 - 27 September 1943)
- Royal Naval Air Station Hatston (HMS Sparrowhawk), Mainland, Orkney, (27 September - 6 December 1943)
- Royal Naval Air Station Machrihanish (HMS Landrail), Argyll and Bute, (6 December 1943 - 1 January 1944)
- Royal Naval Air Station Maydown (HMS Shrike), County Londonderry, (1 - 9 January 1944)
- Royal Naval Air Station Machrihanish (HMS Landrail), Argyll and Bute, (9 January - 12 February 1944)
  - HMS Ravager (Deck Landing Training (DLT) 8 - 9 February 1944)
- Royal Naval Air Station Abbotsinch (HMS Sanderling), Renfrewshire, (12 - 27 February 1944)
- SS Strathnaven (crews)/HMS Engadine (aircraft) (27 February - 5 April 1944)
- Royal Naval Air Station Katukurunda (HMS Ukussa), Ceylon, (5 April - 3 May 1944)
  - HMS Unicorn (Deck Landing Training (DLT) 29 - 30 April 1944)
- HMS Illustrious (3 - 28 May 1944)
- Royal Naval Air Station Katukurunda (HMS Ukussa), Ceylon, - Fighter Flight (3 May - 1 June 1944)
- RN Air Section China Bay, Ceylon, (28 May - 3 June 1944)
- HMS Begum (3 June - 2 July 1944)
- RN Air Section Minneriya, Ceylon, (2 - 23 July 1944)
- HMS Begum (23 July - 22 December 1944)
  - RN Air Section Port Reitz, Kenya, (Detachment six aircrtaft 21 September - 5 October 1944)
- Royal Naval Air Station Colombo Racecourse (HMS Berhunda), Ceylon, (22 December 1944 - 15 January 1945)
- HMS Begum (15 January - 21 February 1945)
- disbanded UK - (21 February 1945)

== Commanding officers ==
List of commanding officers of 832 Naval Air Squadron:

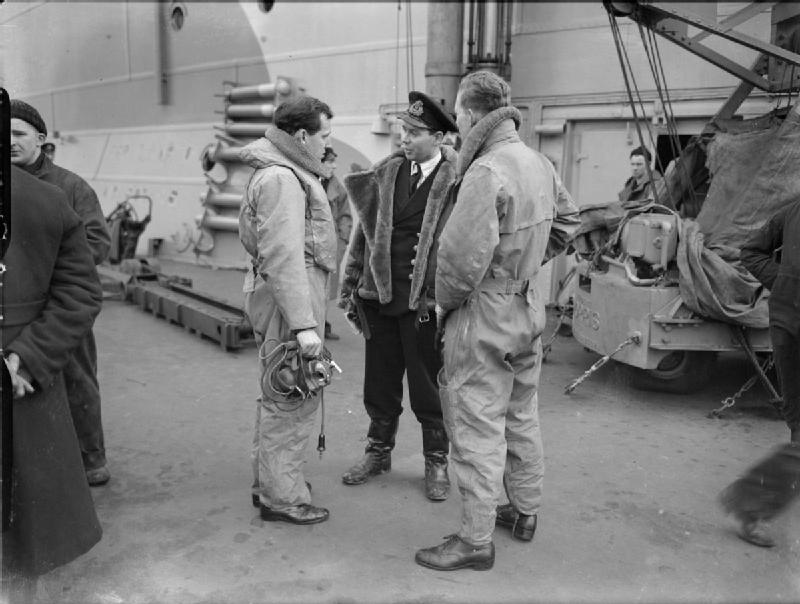
Lieutenant J.C.N. Shrubsole, RN (with hat), talking to Lieutenant Commander Plugge, RN, in flying kit, CO of 832 NAS, on board HMS Victorious

- Lieutenant Commander A.J.P. Plugge, RN, from 1 April 1941 ( † 23 February 1942)
- Lieutenant D.J.S.W. George, RANVR, from 23 February 1942
- Lieutenant Commander W.J. Lucas, RN, from 28 February 1942
- Lieutenant Commander(A) F.K.A. Low, RN, from 30 April 1943
- Lieutenant Commander(A) J.E. Randell, RNVR, from 14 October 1944
- disbanded - 21 February 1945

Note: Abbreviation (A) signifies Air Branch of the RN or RNVR.
