= SS Clan Campbell (1937) =

- Clan Campbell being launched at Greenock in 1937

History

United Kingdom
- Name: Clan Campbell
- Namesake: Clan Campbell
- Owner: Clan Line Steamers Ltd
- Operator: Cayzer, Irvine & Co Ltd
- Port of registry: (United Kingdom) Glasgow
- Builder: Greenock Dockyard Co, Scotland
- Yard number: 427
- Launched: 14 January 1937
- Completed: 1937
- Identification: UK official number 164112; Call sign GZLT
- Fate: Sunk by bombing, 23 March 1942

General characteristics
- Class & type: Cameron-class cargo steamship
- Tonnage: 7,255 GRT; tonnage under deck 6,318; 3,662 NRT
- Length: 463.7 feet (141.3 m) p/p
- Beam: 63.0 feet (19.2 m)
- Depth: 29.9 feet (9.1 m)
- Installed power: 1,362 NHP
- Propulsion: two 3-cylinder triple-expansion engines; two low-pressure exhaust steam turbines; twin screw
- Speed: 17.5 knots (32 km/h)
- Sensors & processing systems: direction finding equipment; echo sounding device; gyrocompass
- Armament: DEMS
- Notes: sister ships: Clan Buchanan, Clan Cameron, Clan Chattan, Clan Cumming, Clan Ferguson, Clan Forbes, Clan Fraser, Clan Lamont, Clan Menzies, HMS Engadine

SS Clan Campbell was a British cargo steamship. She was built for Clan Line Steamers Ltd as one of its Cameron-class steamships. She was launched at Greenock in 1937, served in the Second World War and was sunk in the Mediterranean in 1942.

== Building ==
Clan Campbell was launched on 14 January 1937. She was one of a sub-class of 11 Cameron-class ships of identical dimensions, built in 1937–41 by the Greenock Dockyard Company on the River Clyde at Greenock in Renfrewshire: Clan Buchanan, Clan Cameron, Clan Chattan, Clan Campbell, Clan Cumming, Clan Ferguson, Clan Fraser, Clan Forbes, Clan Lamont, Clan Menzies and HMS Engadine.

Clan Campbell's boilers had a combined heating surface of 17,780 square feet (1,652 m^{2}) and supplied steam at 220 lb_{f}/in^{2} to a pair of three-cylinder triple-expansion steam engines. Steam exhausted from the low-pressure cylinders then drove a pair of low-pressure steam turbines with double reduction gearing and hydraulic couplings to twin propeller shafts. J G Kincaid and Company of Greenock built the four engines, whose combined power was rated at 1,362 NHP.

== Early war service ==
In 1939 Clan Campbell sailed home with Convoy HG 5, which left Gibraltar on 29 October and reached UK ports on 6 November. Later that month she sailed with Convoy OA 38, which assembled off Southend-on-Sea on 20 November and dispersed at sea on 23 November.

In 1940 Clan Campbell sailed with Convoy OA 114, which assembled off Southend-on-Sea on 21 March and dispersed at sea on 24 March. Later that year she joined Convoy AP 3/1 to Suez in Egypt, which left Liverpool on 10 September, sailed via the Cape of Good Hope and Durban in South Africa. En route she seems to have called at Aden, as she is listed as joining Convoy US 5A off Aden and proceeding with it to Suez, arriving on 2 November. On 19 November she left Suez with Convoy BS 9 and again put into Aden.

== Operation Tiger ==
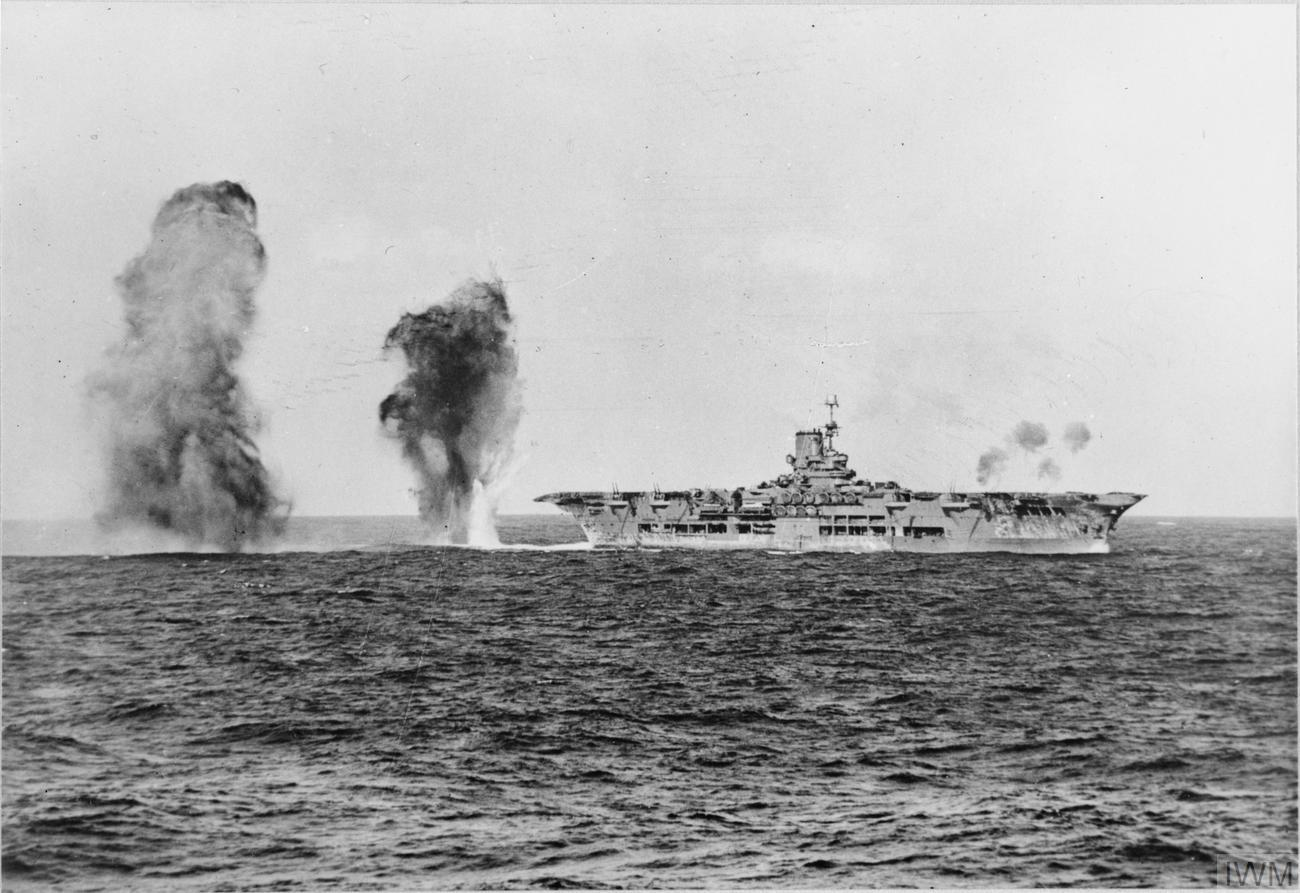
Operation Tiger's escort included HMS Ark Royal, seen here defending an earlier Malta Convoy in the Battle of Cape Spartivento

For UK ships of their era, Cameron-class ships were notable for their speed. Therefore, in 1941 they were among the merchant ships chosen to help relieve the Siege of Malta and British and Empire forces in Egypt. On 26 April Clan Campbell and her sisters Clan Chattan and Clan Lamont sailed from the Firth of Clyde with Convoy WS 8A. The convoy continued to Freetown in Sierra Leone, but the three Camerons and two other cargo ships, Empire Song and New Zealand Star left en route and put into Gibraltar. There they joined Operation Tiger under a heavy escort of 19 Royal Navy ships: Force H's aircraft carrier HMS Ark Royal, battleship HMS Queen Elizabeth, battlecruiser HMS Renown and four cruisers, screened by the 5th Destroyer Flotilla.

Empire Song was owned by the Ministry of War Transport but, like the three Clan Liners, was managed by Cayzer, Irvine & Co Ltd. On 9 May she was sunk by a mine off Malta, but New Zealand Star and the three Camerons safely delivered their cargos, including over 200 Matilda II and Crusader tanks to Alexandria.

== MW convoys and loss ==
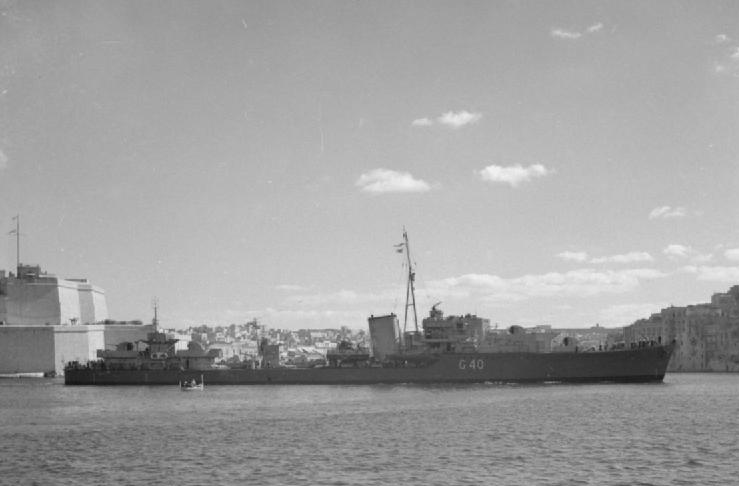
Convoy MW 9A's escort included HMS Lively, which sank the disabled Rowallan Castle to prevent her capture

In 1942 Clan Campbell, her sister ship Clan Chattan and the Union-Castle Line ship Rowallan Castle formed Convoy MW 9A, which left Alexandria for Malta on 12 February. Two days later an air attack sank Clan Chattan and damaged Rowallan Castle and Clan Campbell. Rowallan Castle was so badly damaged that the L-class destroyer HMS Lively sank her to prevent her from being captured. Clan Campbell put into Tobruk and then returned to Alexandria.

On 20 March Clan Campbell again left Alexandria for Malta, this time as one of four cargo ships with Convoy MW 10. Rear Admiral Sir Philip Vian commanded its escort, which included four light cruisers, an anti-aircraft cruiser and 18 destroyers. The weather was initially thick and stormy, which helped to hide the ships from enemy reconnaissance, but it cleared while the ships were off Cyrenaica and they were seen by enemy aircraft.

On 22 March four Italian cruisers tried to intercept the convoy but the Royal Navy escorts drove them off in a short engagement. That afternoon the Italian battleship Littorio arrived, escorted by two cruisers. The British attacked with torpedoes against heavy odds, again forcing the Italians to break off and retire. Off Malta on 23 March aircraft attacked the convoy. Clan Campbell was hit by bombs and a torpedo. 10 members of her complement were killed, and she was abandoned and sank. The other cargo ships reached Malta on 24 March but were sunk by air attacks: Pampas and the Norwegian Talabot on 26 March and the cargo liner MV Breconshire the following day.

Clan Campbell's Master, JF Vooght, was among the dead. He was posthumously awarded the MBE and Lloyd's War Medal for Bravery at Sea.
