= Magic Carpet =

A magic carpet is a mythological flying (or "teleporting") rug.

Magic carpet may also refer to:

== Film, video, music and print media ==
- The Magic Carpet Magazine, 1930s pulp magazine originally called Oriental Stories
- IMAX Magic Carpet, large format film system in 1990
- Magic Carpet (Aladdin), silent character featured in 1992 Disney film Aladdin and its franchise
- Magic Carpet (video game), 1994 first person shooter game from Bullfrog Productions
- Early form of "Extreme Gear" (type of racing vehicle) in the 2006 video game, Sonic Riders
- "Magic Carpet" (song), 1963 song by English performer Billy J. Kramer
- Magic Carpet (band), English psychedelic folk band during 1970s
- The Magic Carpet (film), a 1951 American adventure film

== Military operations ==
- Magic Carpet, slang term for Malta convoy supply runs from Alexandria to Malta by British submarines during the Siege of Malta during World War II
- Operation Magic Carpet, post-World War II U.S. Navy military operation
- Operation Magic Carpet (Yemen), the 1949–50 airlift of Yemenite Jews to Israel

== Transportation ==
- Magic carpet (ski lift), type of surface lift found at ski areas
- Cessna Experimental Magic Carpet, light aircraft research project

== See also ==
- Magic Carpet Ride (disambiguation)
- Flying carpet (disambiguation)
