= HMS Athene =

1940 Cameron-class aircraft transport ship of the Royal Navy

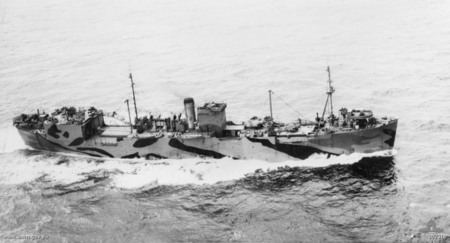

History

United Kingdom
- Name: HMS Athene
- Builder: Greenock & Grangemouth Dockyard Company, Greenock, Scotland
- Yard number: 444
- Launched: 1 October 1940
- Out of service: Returned to Clan Line, 1946
- Fate: Scrapped from 19 July 1963

General characteristics
- Class & type: Cameron-class steamship
- Type: Aircraft Transport
- Displacement: 10,700 tons
- Length: 487 ft 8 in (148.6 m) (o.a.)
- Beam: 63 ft (19.2 m)
- Draught: 28 ft 6 in (8.7 m)
- Propulsion: 2 × steam triple expansion engines; 2 × low pressure exhaust turbines; twin screw, 8,300 bhp
- Speed: 17 knots (31 km/h)
- Armament: 1 × 4 in (0.102 m) LA, 1 × 4 in Dual-purpose gun; 2 × Bofors 40 mm gun; 12 × Oerlikon 20 mm cannon
- Aircraft carried: up to 40 carried, single catapult

HMS Athene was a Royal Navy aircraft transport. She was a merchant conversion, requisitioned by the Navy during the Second World War and returned after its end. She is the only ship of the Royal Navy to be named after the Greek goddess Athene. She was broken up in 1963.

== Career ==
She was originally built as the Cameron-class steamship Clan Brodie, for the Clan Line at the yards of the Greenock & Grangemouth Dockyard Company Greenock, Scotland. The Navy requisitioned her and she was launched on 1 October 1940 as the aircraft transport HMS Athene.

Athene received a single catapult, and operated as a seaplane carrier in the South Atlantic over 1942/43.

In June 1943 Athene departed from San Diego bound for Pearl Harbor under escort by the Barnegat Class seaplane tender USS Chincoteague (AVP-24)

In 1946 the Navy returned her to Clan Line. She was reconverted for merchant service and served until 1963, when she was sold for scrap. She arrived in Hong Kong for breaking up on 19 July 1963.

== See also ==
- HMS Engadine
