= SS Clan Chisholm =

SS Clan Chisholm is the name of the following ships that served the Clan Line:

- SS Clan Chisholm (1896), sold to Japan in 1925 and renamed Fukko Maru
- SS Clan Chisholm (1937), sunk by a German U-boat in 1939
- SS Clan Chisholm (1944), scrapped in 1962

== See also ==
- Clan Chisholm
