= Cameron-class steamship =

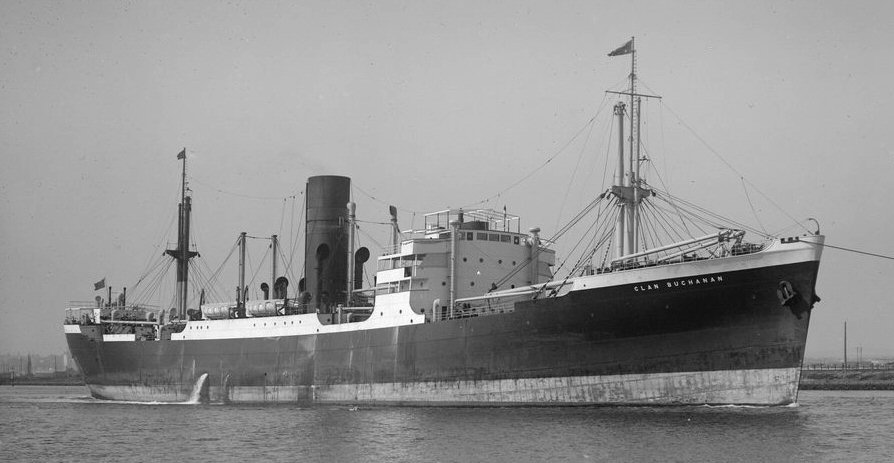
- Clan Buchanan (1937)

Class overview
- Builders: Greenock Dockyard Company
- Operators: Royal Navy (WWII)
- Built: 1935–42
- In service: 1936–70
- Completed: 20
- Lost: 9
- Scrapped: 11

General characteristics
- Type: Cargo ship
- Tonnage: 7,178 – 10,700 GRT
- Length: 425–488 ft (130–149 m)
- Beam: 57–63 ft (17–19 m)
- Draft: 27–30 ft (8.2–9.1 m)
- Propulsion: 2 × 3-cylinder triple-expansion engines; 2 × low-pressure exhaust steam turbines; twin screw
- Speed: 16–17.5 knots (18.4–20.1 mph; 29.6–32.4 km/h)
- Complement: 78

The Cameron-class steamships were a class of UK cargo twin-screw steamships. They were designed for Clan Line and were also used by Scottish Shire Line and the Royal Navy.

The Greenock Dockyard Company built all members of the class.

Most members of the class had two triple-expansion engines, each coupled to a low-pressure exhaust steam turbine. The exception was Lanarkshire, which was built with six turbines and no reciprocating engines,

== Clan Line ships ==
Clan line owned 16 Cameron-class ships. Ten were sunk in the Second World War.

- Clan Macarthur, launched in 1935, sunk in the Indian Ocean by German submarine U-181 in August 1943.
- Clan Macaulay, launched in 1936, damaged by bombing at Malta, scrapped in 1963.
- Clan Buchanan, launched in 1937, sunk in the Indian Ocean by the German auxiliary cruiser Pinguin in 1941.
- Clan Cameron, launched in 1937, scrapped 1959.
- Clan Campbell, launched in 1937, sunk by bombing off Malta 1942.
- Clan Chattan, launched in 1937, sunk by bombing off Crete in 1942.
- Clan Chisholm, launched in 1937, sailed in convoy from Gibraltar and torpedoed and sunk by U-48 in October 1939.
- Clan Cumming, launched in 1937, convoy duties to Malta and Piraeus, torpedoed off Piraeus in January 1941 but reached port, sunk by mine in the Gulf of Athens April 1941.
- Clan Ferguson, launched in 1938, torpedoed and sunk by aircraft on a Malta convoy August 1942.
- Clan Forbes, launched in 1938, convoy duties to Malta and Piraeus disguised as the depot ship HMS Maidstone with a dummy funnel, scrapped in 1959.
- Clan Fraser, launched in 1938, convoy duties to Malta and Piraeus. Hit by aerial bombs in Piraeus harbour in April 1941 whilst carrying a cargo of ammunition, exploded and sunk.
- Clan Menzies, launched in 1938, sunk by torpedo off Ireland in 1940.
- Clan Macdonald, launched in 1939, war service as Convoy Commodore ship on Mediterranean convoy to Piraeus 1941, thence to Brisbane and back to United Kingdom, bombed in UK, transferred to Houston Line in 1960, scrapped in China 1970.
- Clan Lamont, launched in 1939, served as a Landing Ship Infantry for the Normandy Landings in 1944 making six crossings carrying troops, was commissioned as HMS Lamont in July 1944 and served in the Far East. She was restored to Clan Line 1947 and scrapped in Japan in 1961.

== Shire Line ships ==
Two members of the class were built for Scottish Shire Line, which was closely associated with Clan Line:

- Perthshire, launched in 1936, suffered an engine room fire in 1963 and was scrapped in Japan in 1965.
- Lanarkshire, launched in 1940, became Bullard, King's Umgazi in 1959. She was renamed Grysbok in 1960. Safmarine acquired her in 1961 and renamed her South African Farmer. She was scrapped in Japan in 1963.

== Empire ships ==
Three members of the class were launched and owned as Empire ships.

- Empire Song, launched in 1940, owned by the Ministry of Shipping and managed by Cayzer, Irvine. Taking part in the Malta convoy Operation Tiger she was sunk by a mine in the Mediterranean in 1942.
- Empire Might, launched in 1942, owned by the Ministry of War Transport and managed by Blue Star Line. Became Clan Line's Clan MacRae in 1946. Became Bullard, King's Umgeni in 1959. Renamed Gemsbok in 1960, South African Financier in 1961 and Santa Maria de Ordaz in 1962, then scrapped in 1962.
- Empire Wisdom, launched in 1942, owned by the Ministry of War Transport and managed by Cayzer, Irvine. Blue Star Line took over management in 1944, and renamed her Royal Star in 1946. Renamed Caledonia Star in 1961. Scrapped in 1972.

== Royal Navy ships ==
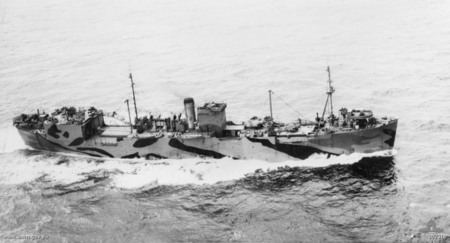
HMS Athene, later Clan Brodie

The Admiralty requisitioned three members of the class for the Royal Navy in 1942 while they were being built:

- HMS Athene (seaplane depot ship), launched in 1940, returned to Clan Line in 1946 as Clan Brodie, and scrapped in Hong Kong in 1963.
- HMS Engadine (seaplane depot ship), launched in 1941, returned to Clan Line in 1946 and renamed Clan Buchanan, and scrapped in Spain in 1962.
- HMS Bonaventure (submarine depot ship for X-craft) launched in 1942, returned to Clan Line in 1948 as Clan Davidson, and scrapped in Hong Kong in 1963.
