= Magic Carpet Ride =

Magic Carpet Ride may refer to:

- "Magic Carpet Ride" (Steppenwolf song), 1968
- "Magic Carpet Ride" (Mighty Dub Katz song), 1995
- "Magic Carpet Ride" (Gabriella Cilmi song), 2010
- "Magic Carpet Ride", an episode of season 3 of Phineas and Ferb
- "Magic Carpet Ride", a song by Hanoi Rocks, found as a bonus track on some versions of their album Two Steps from the Move
- "Magic Carpet Ride", a 2016 song by Dune
- Magic Carpet Ride (film), a 2005 Turkish film
- Magic Carpet Ride, a statue nicknamed the Cardiff Kook, in Cardiff-by-the-Sea, California
- Magic Carpet ride, a slang term for Malta Convoys from Alexandria to Malta by submarine during the WWII Siege of Malta

== See also ==
- Magic carpet (disambiguation)
