= SS Clan Chisholm (1937) =

Coordinates: 45°15′N 15°5′W

History

United Kingdom
- Name: Clan Chisholm
- Owner: Clan Line Steamers Ltd, London
- Operator: Cayzer, Irvine & Co Ltd, London
- Port of registry: Glasgow
- Builder: Greenock & Grangemouth Dockyard Co Ltd, Greenock
- Yard number: 429
- Launched: 5 August 1937
- Completed: 1937
- Identification: Call sign GBGS; UK official number 165915
- Fate: Sunk by torpedo, 17 October 1939

General characteristics
- Class & type: Cameron-class steamship
- Tonnage: 7,256 GRT; tonnage under deck 6,320; 3,671 NRT
- Length: 463.7 feet (141.3 m) p/p
- Beam: 63.0 feet (19.2 m)
- Depth: 29.9 feet (9.1 m)
- Installed power: 1,043 NHP
- Propulsion: 2 × steam triple expansion engines; low pressure exhaust steam turbines; twin screw
- Speed: 17 knots (31 km/h)
- Crew: 78
- Sensors & processing systems: direction finding equipment; echo sounding device; gyrocompass

SS Clan Chisholm was a British cargo steamship. She was torpedoed and sunk in the Second World War while carrying cargo from India to Scotland.

== Building ==
Clan Chisholm was one of the Clan Line's Cameron-class steamships, built by the Greenock & Grangemouth Dockyard Co Ltd, Greenock and launched on 5 August 1937. She was registered in Glasgow.

Chisholm had a pair of three-cylinder steam triple expansion engines and a pair of low pressure steam turbines, all built by J.G. Kincaid & Co of Greenock. Each turbine was powered by exhaust steam from the low-pressure cylinder of one of the piston engines. The combined power output of this plant was rated at 1,043 NHP. She was propelled by twin screws, each driven by one triple-expansion engine and one turbine.

== Final voyage and sinking ==
On 3 September 1939, the day that the UK declared war on Germany, Chisholm was crossing the Bay of Bengal from Chittagong in Bengal to Madras in India, where she arrived on 5 September. On 9 September she sailed for Glasgow carrying 3,300 tons of tea, 1,900 tons of jute, 1,750 tons of pig iron and 2,600 tons of general cargo. Her Master was Francis Stenson.

Chisholm crossed the Indian Ocean, calling at Tuticorin on 13 September, Colombo in Ceylon overnight on the 14–15th, Aden on the 23rd and Suez on the 30th. She passed through the Suez Canal to Port Said where she joined Convoy Blue 3, which sailed on 1 October and reached Gibraltar on the 11th. There she joined Convoy HG 3 which sailed on 13 October and was to take her as far as Liverpool.

On the evening of 17 October German submarine U-48, commanded by Kapitänleutnant Herbert Schultze, sighted Chisholm under way some 150 nautical miles (280 km) northwest of Cape Finisterre. At 2032 hrs Schultze hit Chisholm with a torpedo that failed to explode. At 2035 he hit her with a second torpedo, which detonated. Chisholm sank in a few minutes and four crew members were killed. Captain Stenson and 41 other survivors were rescued by the Swedish cargo ship MV Bardaland and landed at Kirkwall. Another 17 were picked up by the Norwegian whaling ship Skudd, and the remaining 15 were rescued by the Union-Castle Line ship MV Warwick Castle.

Approximate position of Clan Chisholm's wreck in the North Atlantic

== Replacement ship ==
In 1944 the same shipbuilder, Greenock Dockyard Co Ltd, completed a replacement Clan Chisholm for Clan Line. Compared with her predecessor, the new Chisholm had almost the same length and beam, a pair of Kincaid triple-expansion engines of the same dimensions and with the same arrangement of feeding exhaust steam to low-pressure turbines. However, her depth was 38.1 feet (11.6 m), which was 8.2 feet (2.5 m) greater than her predecessor. Her GRT was 9,581, which was 2,325 tons bigger than her predecessor. She survived the war but later suffered a fire and in August 1962 was scrapped in Hong Kong.
