= Flying carpet (disambiguation) =

A flying carpet is a magic carpet, a common trope in fantasy fiction.

Flying carpet may also refer to:

- Flying Carpet (airline), later Med Airways, a Lebanese airline operating 2000–2015
- Flying Carpet (game), a board game published 1987
