= HMS Breconshire =

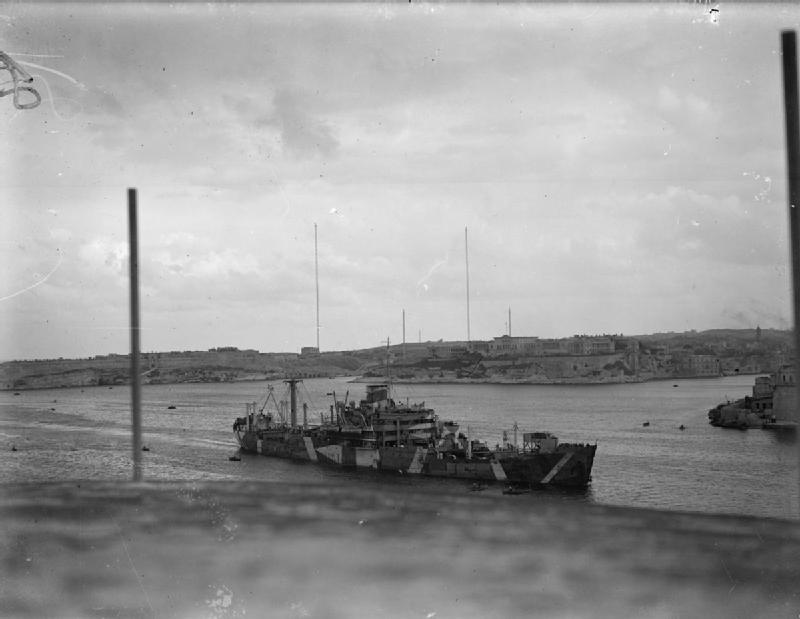
- Breconshire in Grand Harbour, Malta

History
- Name: Breconshire
- Owner: Glen Line
- Port of registry: Liverpool, England
- Builder: Taikoo Dockyard & Engineering, Hong Kong
- Launched: 2 February 1939
- Identification: UK official number: 172758; Code letters: GSGF
- Fate: Sunk by Axis bombers, 27 March 1942

General characteristics
- Type: Cargo liner
- Tonnage: 9,776 GRT; 5,908 NRT
- Length: 483 ft (147.22 m)
- Beam: 66 ft 4 in (20.22 m)
- Draught: 30 ft 6 in (9.30 m)
- Depth: 31 ft 2 in (9.50 m)
- Decks: 2
- Installed power: 2 × diesel engines (2,469 nhp)
- Propulsion: 2 × screws
- Speed: 14 knots (26 km/h; 16 mph)

MV Breconshire was a 9,776-gross register ton (GRT) cargo liner built in the late 1930s for the Glen Line. She was taken over by the Royal Navy during World War II as a supply ship and modified to carry fuel oil. The ship participated in many Malta convoys and was sunk by Axis bombers on 27 March 1942.

This ship was a former Holt liner converted to serve as a fast tanker. She was forced to beach due to damage sustained during a convoy run from Alexandria to Malta. Though the ship was put out of action, she was stranded high enough out of the water that some of her vital cargo of petroleum was salvaged.
