= Flying Carpet (game) =

Board game published by Ravensburger in 1987

Flying Carpet is a board game published by Ravensburger in 1987.

== Gameplay ==
Flying Carpet is a fantasy family game.

== Reviews ==
- Jeux & Stratégie #45 (as "Le Tapis Volant")
- Games #92
