= HMS Engadine (1941) =

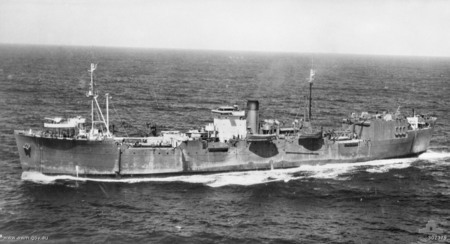
- Aerial view in December 1942

History

United Kingdom
- Name: HMS Engadine
- Builder: Greenock Dockyard Company, Greenock, Scotland
- Laid down: 16 March 1940
- Launched: 26 May 1941
- Completed: 17 November 1941
- Fate: Sold 1946

United Kingdom
- Name: Clan Buchanan
- Owner: Clan Line
- Acquired: 1946
- Fate: Scrapped November 1962

General characteristics
- Class & type: Cameron-class steamship
- Tonnage: 9,909 GRT
- Length: 464 ft (141 m)
- Beam: 63 ft (19 m)
- Draught: 30 ft (9.1 m)
- Propulsion: 2 × 3-cylinder triple-expansion engines; 2 × low-pressure exhaust steam turbines; twin screw
- Speed: 16 knots (30 km/h)
- Complement: 78

HMS Engadine was a 9,909 GRT cargo ship laid down at the Greenock Dockyard Company, Greenock, Scotland on 16 March 1940, launched on 26 May 1941 and completed on 17 November 1941.

She was ordered by Clan Line, and was to be named Clan Buchanan (the previous Clan Buchanan having been sunk by the German auxiliary cruiser Pinguin on 28 April 1941). However the Admiralty requisitioned her for the Royal Navy before completion and renamed after the first HMS Engadine for use as a seaplane depot ship.

She was loaned to the United States Navy from November 1942 until July 1943. After the war, she was restored to Clan Line in 1946 and given her originally-intended name. The ship was scrapped at Cartagena, Spain in November 1962.
