= Greenock Dockyard Company =

The Greenock Dockyard Company was a Scottish shipbuilding and ship repair firm located at Greenock, on the River Clyde.

== History ==
The company was established by J E Scott of Greenock, with the yard at Cartsdyke being taken over in 1879 by Russell and Company, of Greenock, which later became Lithgows. The dockyard had been well established when it merged with the Grangemouth Dockyard Co Ltd to become the Grangemouth and Greenock Dockyard in 1900. After eight years, the name changed to Greenock & Grangemouth Dockyard Co. The Greenock yard was then sold to the operators of the Clan Line in 1918 and in 1920 it was incorporated as the Greenock Dockyard Co Ltd.

In 1935, the Greenock Dockyard exchanged its yards with those of their neighbour, Scotts Shipbuilding and Engineering Company. The Greenock Dockyard Company built a large number of merchant ships for British merchant lines before, during and after the wars. In 1966 the company was taken over by Scotts Shipbuilding & Engineering Co Ltd, and then became part of Scott Lithgow in 1967. The Cartsdyke yard eventually ceased building ships and closed in 1979.
