= List of Empire ships (Ca–Cl) =

== Suffix beginning Ca to Cl ==
=== Empire Cabot ===
Empire Cabot was a 6,722 GRT cargo ship which was built by William Gray & Co. Ltd., West Hartlepool. Launched on 9 July 1941 and completed in September 1941. Sold in 1945 to Pool Shipping Co Ltd and renamed Clearpool. Operated under the management of Sir R Ropner & Co Ltd. Sold in 1955 to Cardigan Shipping Co Ltd and renamed Grelmarion. Operated under the management of T Walter Gould & Co Ltd, Cardiff. Sold in 1959 to Bowring & Curry Ltd, and renamed Rachel. Operated under the management of R M Sloman Jr, Germany. Arrived at Hong Kong for scrapping on 8 November 1959.

=== Empire Cadet ===
Empire Cadet was an 813 GRT coastal tanker which was built by Grangemouth Dockyard Co, Grangemouth. Launched on 5 March 1942 and completed in June 1942. Sold in 1946 to the French Government and renamed Mascara. Sold in 1948 to Solfumar Transport de Vins, France. Sold in 1951 to F T Everard & Sons Ltd and renamed Aureity. Scrapped at Barrow in Furness in June 1968.

=== Empire Caicos ===
Empire Caicos was a 3,538 GRT cargo ship which was built by William Gray & Co Ltd, West Hartlepool. Launched on 28 February 1945 and completed in March 1945. Sold in 1946 to Silvertown Services Ltd and renamed Sugar Transporter. Operated under the management of R S Dalgleish Ltd. Sold in 1957 to J Paterson & Co (Pty) Ltd, Australia and renamed Pattawilya. Sold in 1962 to Cronulla Shipping Co Ltd and renamed Clovelly. Operated under the management of J Manners & Co Ltd, Hong Kong. Damaged in a storm on 6 January 1967. Towed into Sasebo. Arrived at Uchiumi for scrapping on 13 May 1967.

=== Empire Calder ===
Empire Calder was a 2,646 GRT cargo ship which was built by Stettiner Oderwerke AG, Stettin. Launched in 1923 as Stettin for Stettiner Dampfer-Compagnie. Sold in 1935 to Deutsche Levant Line, Hamburg and renamed Akka. Taken as a war prize at Flensburg in May 1945 and renamed Empire Calder. Sold in 1947 to Near East Shipping Co, London and renamed Isgo. Sold in 1950 to Karl Gross, Bremen and renamed Erich. Sold in 1960 to Palomba & Salvatori, Italy and renamed Pantera. Scrapped in Italy in October 1970.

=== Empire Call ===
Empire Call was a 7,067 GRT cargo ship which was built by William Hamilton & Co Ltd, Port Glasgow. Launched on 10 February 1944 and completed in July 1944. Sold in 1945 to the French Government and renamed Ingénieur Général Haarbleicher. Ran aground on Stromboli 21 November 1945. Broke in two and declared a total loss.

=== Empire Calshot ===
Empire Calshot was a 7,131 GRT cargo ship which was built by Burntisland Shipbuilding Company Ltd, Fife. Launched on 10 July 1945 and completed in November 1945. Sold in 1946 to McCowan & Gross Ltd and renamed Derrycunihy. Sold in 1952 to Argobeam Shipping Co Ltd and renamed Argobeam. Operated under the management of A Lusi Ltd, London. Engine room fire on 19 August 1955. The ship had a 40° list to port when the fire was extinguished and she was abandoned. Taken in tow by tug Salveda on 21 August at 58°40′N 15°14′W. Arrived at Stornoway on 25 August and pumped out. Towed to Copenhagen for discharge of cargo then on to Hamburg. Sold to Turnbull, Scott & Co Ltd and repaired. Renamed Parkgate. Sold in 1960 to Compagnia Navigazione Patlem SA and renamed Panagos. Operated under the management of G Lemos, Greece. Arrived at Shanghai on 26 September 1968 for scrapping.

=== Empire Camel ===
Empire Camel was a 2,719 GRT cargo ship which was built by Deutsche Werft, Hamburg. Launched in 1929 as Ceuta for Oldenburg-Portuguese Line. Sunk on 28 March 1943 by Allied bombing at Rotterdam. Raised and repaired. Taken as a war prize at Kiel in May 1945, renamed Empire Camel. To Danish Government in 1946 and renamed Rinkenaes. Sold to Foroya Logting, Faroe Islands in 1947 and renamed Oyrnafell. Sold to Oldenburg-Portuguese Line in 1956 and renamed Safi. Scrapped in Hamburg in January 1960.

=== Empire Cameron ===
Empire Cameron was a 7,015 GRT cargo ship which was built by William Denny & Bros Ltd. Launched on 19 November 1941 and completed in December 1941. Sold in 1946 to Shakespear Shipping Co Ltd and renamed St Margaret. Operated under the management of South American Saint Line Ltd, Cardiff. Sold in 1960 to Agna Compagnia Navigazione SA, Panama and renamed Agna. Operated under the management of Tharros Shipping Co Ltd, London. Arrived on 17 July 1963 at Yawata for scrapping.

=== Empire Camp ===
Empire Camp was a refrigerated 7,052 GRT cargo ship which was built by Short Brothers Ltd, Sunderland. Launched on 17 June 1943 and completed in October 1943. Sold in 1946 to Cunard White Star Line and renamed Valacia. Sold in 1951 to Bristol City Line of Steamships Ltd and renamed New York City. Operated under the management of C Hill & Sons, Bristol. Sold in 1955 to Glasgow United Shipping Co Ltd and renamed Loch Morar. Operated under the management of Mackay & MacIntyre Ltd, Glasgow. Sold in 1959 to Lufti Yelenkci Evlatari Donmata Istiraki, Turkey and renamed Yelkenci. Arrived on 20 February 1971 at Istanbul for scrapping.

=== Empire Campden ===
Empire Campden was an 890 GRT coastal tanker which was built by A & J Inglis Ltd, Glasgow. Launched on 30 April 1945 and completed in August 1945. Sold in 1947 to F T Everard Ltd and renamed Anonity. Sold in 1966 to John S Lastis, Greece, and renamed Petrola II. Sold in 1969 to P C Chrissochoides & Others, Greece and renamed Kalymnos. Aground on 12 April 1970 off Rhodes. Constructive total loss. Towed to Piraeus, scrapped by D. Vittiotis & Salmina, Piraeus in May 1970.

=== Empire Candida ===
Empire Candida was a 2,908 GRT cargo ship which was built by William Gray & Co. Ltd., West Hartlepool. Launched on 8 December 1942 and completed in February 1943. Sold in 1947 to Zinal Shipping Co and renamed Burdale. Operated under the management of Burness Shipping Co Ltd. To Z Shipping Co in 1948 and renamed Peldale, still under the management of Burness. Sold in 1954 to Jansens Rederi A/Z. Norway and renamed Statius Jansen. Sold in 1959 to New China Steamship Co and renamed Sunny. Operated under the management of Wallem & Co, Hong Kong. Sold in 1961 to P T Maskapai Pelyaran Sumatera, Jakarta. Developed a leak on 5 April 1969 at 20°10′N 120°25′E on voyage to breakers. Escorted to Kaohsiung, Taiwan where she arrived for scrapping on 8 April.

=== Empire Canning ===
Empire Canning was a 6,997 GRT cargo ship built by Caledon Shipbuilding & Engineering Co Ltd, Dundee. Launched on 30 October 1944 and completed in December 1944. Sold in 1946 to Britain Steamship Co Ltd and renamed Willesden. Operated under the management of Watts, Watts & Co Ltd. Sold in 1958 to World Wide Shipping Co Ltd, Hong Kong and renamed Golden Lambda. Sold in 1960 to Neptune Shipping Co Ltd and renamed Marine Explorer. Sold in 1962 to Viking Shipping Co Ltd and renamed East Vim. Sold in 1963 to Marine Navigation Co Ltd, London, and renamed Wakasa Bay. Sold in 1966 to Leo Shipping Ltd, Hong Kong, and renamed Golden Wind. Operated under the management of World Wide Shipping Ltd, Hong Kong. Scrapped at Hiroshima, Japan in December 1966.

=== Empire Canute ===
Empire Canute was a 7,908 GRT heavy lift ship which was built by Greenock Dockyard Co Ltd, Greenock. Launched on 24 December 1945 as Empire Canute. Completed in June 1947 as Belocean for Belships Co Ltd. Operated under the management of C Smith & Co Ltd, Oslo. Re-engined in October 1954. Sold in 1964 to Bacong Shipping Co SA, Panama, and renamed Southern Star. Operated under the management of Southern Industrial Products Inc, Manila. Sold in 1968 to Manila Interocean Lines Inc, Manila, and renamed Marie Ann. Arrived on 29 July 1976 at Gadani Beach, Pakistan for scrapping.

=== Empire Canyon ===
Empire Canyon was a 7,050 GRT cargo ship which was built by Caledon Shipbuilding & Engineering Co Ltd, Dundee. Launched on 11 November 1943 and completed in December 1943. Sold in 1947 to Alexander Shipping Co Ltd and renamed Holmbury. Operated under the management of Houlder Bros Ltd. Sold in 1960 to United Oriental Shipping Co Ltd, Karachi and renamed Ilyasbaksh. Arrived at Bombay on 12 August 1965 and was detained whilst undergoing repairs to her rudder due to the war. Impounded by the Indian Government in October 1965. Scrapped in Bombay in December 1970.

=== Empire Cape ===
Empire Cape was an 872 GRT coaster which was built by Scott & Sons, Bowling. Launched on 27 March 1941 and completed in July 1941. Sold in 1945 to Dundee, Perth & London Shipping Co and renamed Gowrie. Renamed Lochee in 1948. Sold in 1966 to D & S Zoulis & others, Greece and renamed Aghios Spyridon. Sold in 1969 to S C Vazeos, Greece. Sold in 1970 to Abdel Razzak Sattout, Lebanon and renamed Anwar. Sold in 1979 to General United Trading & Shipping Co, SARL, Lebanon.

=== Empire Captain ===
Empire Captain was a 9,875 GRT cargo liner which was built by Caledon Shipbuilding & Engineering Co Ltd, Dundee. Launched on 25 February 1944 and completed in July 1944. Sold in 1946 to Canadian Pacific Steamship Co and renamed Beaverburn. Sold in 1960 to Ben Line Steamers Ltd and renamed Bennachie. Sold in 1964 to Atlantic Navigation Corporation Ltd and renamed Silvana. Operated under the management of W H Eddie Hsu, Formosa. Arrived on 6 April 1971 at Kaohsiung for scrapping.

=== Empire Capulet ===
Empire Capulet was a 7,044 GRT cargo ship which was built by John Readhead & Sons Ltd, South Shields. Launched on 20 January 1943 and completed in March 1943. Sold in 1946 to British & South American Steam Navigation Co Ltd and renamed Hesione. Operated under the management of Houston Line (London) Ltd. Arrived on 5 October 1960 at Hong Kong for scrapping.

=== Empire Carey ===
Empire Carey was a 2,833 GRT cargo ship which was built by William Gray & Co. Ltd., West Hartlepool. Launched on 20 October 1941 and completed in December 1941. To the Norwegian Government in 1942 and renamed Ragnhild. Sold in 1946 to John Wilson's Rederi, Norway, and renamed Penelope. Sold in 1950 to Rederi A/B Pandia, Finland. Sold in 1955 to Lundqvist-Rederierna, Finland. Sold in November 1972 to Wackatz & Co, Gothenburg and converted to a floating grain warehouse with engines removed.

=== Empire Caribou ===
Empire Caribou was a 4,861 GRT cargo ship which was built by Downey Shipbuilding Corp, Arlington, Staten Island, New York. Launched in 1919 as Waterbury for United States Shipping Board (USSB). Sold in 1920 to American Star Line Inc, New York and renamed Northern Star. Sold in 1923 to American Sugar Transit Corp, New York and renamed Defacto. To MoWT in 1940 and renamed Empire Caribou. Torpedoed and sunk on 10 May 1941 at 59°28′N 35°44′W by U-556 after Convoy OB 318 had dispersed.

=== Empire Carpenter ===
Empire Carpenter was a 7,030 GRT cargo ship which was built by C Connell & Co Ltd, Scotstoun. Launched on 21 November 1942 and completed in January 1943. To Soviet Union in 1944 and renamed Dickson. Returned to MoWT in 1946 and renamed Empire Carpenter. Sold in 1947 to Petrinovic & Co Ltd, London, and renamed Petfrano. Sold in 1955 to Compagnia di Navigazione Amipa SA, Panama and renamed Amipa. Sold in 1958 to Compagnia Maritime Apex SA, Panama, and renamed Apex. Renamed Afros in 1968. Sold in 1971 to Campos Shipping Co, Cyprus. Scrapped in Shanghai in March 1971.

=== Empire Carron ===
Empire Carron was a 5,372 GRT cargo ship which was built by Norderwerft AG, Wesermünde. Launched in 1923 as Claus Rickmers for Rickmers Reederei, Hamburg. Damaged on 9 January 1945 in an Allied air raid at Lervik, Norway. Salvaged and towed to Bergen on 25 January 1945. Taken as a war prize at Bergen in May 1945 and repaired. To MoWT in 1947 and renamed Empire Carron. Sold in 1947 to S G Embiricos Ltd, London and renamed Andrian. Sold in 1949 to Compagnia Navigazione Yaviza, Panama and renamed San Nicolas. Scrapped at Spezia, Italy in December 1964.

=== Empire Castle ===
Empire Castle was a 7,356 GRT cargo ship which was built by Harland & Wolff Ltd, Belfast. Launched on 27 August 1942 and completed in January 1943. Sold in 1946 to Blue Star Line and renamed Gothic Star. Renamed Nelson Star in 1948 and Patagonia Star in 1958. Sold in 1961 to Gregory Maritime Ltd and renamed Eirini. Operated under the management of Theodorou & Sons Ltd, London. Diverted to Gibraltar on 29 September 1970 with damaged machinery and then laid up. Caught fire on 6 February 1971, accommodation and bridge deck gutted. Sold for scrap, arrived on 8 July 1971 at Málaga, Spain for scrapping.

=== Empire Catcher ===
Empire Catcher was a 533 GRT whaler which was built by Akers Mekaniske Verksted, Oslo. Launched in 1942, requisitioned by the Kriegsmarine on completion and named Flandern. Seized by Norway in 1945 and renamed Suderoy VII. Allocated to MoWT in 1946 and renamed Empire Catcher. Sold in 1948 to Union Whaling Co Ltd, Durban and renamed R K Fraay. Sold in 1957 to Taiyo Gyogyo KK, Japan and renamed Toshi Maru No. 11 Sold in 1959 to Hokuyo Suisan KK, Japan and renamed Daishin Maru No. 2. Scrapped in Onomichi in August 1964.

=== Empire Catcher II ===
Empire Catcher II was a 533 GRT whaler that was built by Akers Mekaniske Verksted, Oslo. Launched in 1942, requisitioned by the Kriegsmarine on completion, and named Helgoland. Seized by Norway in 1945 and renamed Nor IV. To MoWT in 1946 and renamed Empire Catcher II. Sold in 1948 to Union Whaling Co Ltd, Durban and renamed R L Goulding. Sold in 1957 to Taiyo Gyogyo KK, Japan, and renamed Toshi Maru No. 8. Sold in 1959 to Hokuyo Suisan KK, Japan and renamed Daishin Maru No. 1. Sold in 1963 to Nippon Reizo KK, Japan, then sold in 1967 to Sanwa Sempaku KK, Japan. Name removed from shipping registers in 1980.

=== Empire Cato ===
Empire Cato was a 7,039 GRT cargo ship which was built by William Gray & Co. Ltd., West Hartlepool. Launched on 10 November 1942 and completed in December 1942. Sold in 1948 to Clan Line Steamers Ltd and renamed Clan Mackenzie. Arrived on 14 October 1960 in Hong Kong for scrapping.

=== Empire Cavalier ===
Empire Cavalier was a 9,891 GRT tanker which was built by Sir J Laing & Sons Ltd, Sunderland. Launched on 27 August 1942 and completed in November 1942. Sold in 1945 to British Tanker Co Ltd and renamed British Cavalier. Laid up on 13 November 1957 in Swansea, arrived on 23 May 1959 at Briton Ferry for scrapping.

=== Empire Caxton ===
Empire Caxton was a 2,872 GRT cargo ship which was built by William Gray & Co Ltd, West Hartlepool. Launched on 31 March 1942 and completed in May 1942. Sold in 1945 to Watergate Steamship Co Ltd and renamed Letchworth. Operated under the management of R S Dalgleish Ltd, Newcastle upon Tyne. Sold in 1956 to Sagaland Ltd and renamed Peterland. Operated under the management of Buries, Markes Ltd. Sold in 1959 to Padre Compagnia Navigazione SA and renamed Pamit. Operated under the management of A Halcoussis & Co, Greece. Sold in 1962 to Solmare Compagnia Maritime SA and renamed Christos. Operated under the management of T Samourkas, Greece. Ran aground on 31 March 1967 at Kandeliusa Island, near Kos. Floated off but sank on 1 April 1967 at 36°32′N 26°57′E.

=== Empire Cedar ===
Empire Cedar was a 129 GRT tug which was built by R Dunston Ltd, Thorne. Launched on 26 September 1941 and completed in November 1941. Sold in 1947 to United Towing Co Ltd and renamed Handyman. Scrapped at Bo'ness in April 1966.

=== Empire Cedric ===
Empire Cedric was a 4,820 GRT Landing Ship, Tank (LST) which was built by Yarrows Ltd, Esquimalt, British Columbia. Completed in September 1946 as HMS LST 3534. To MoWT, rebuilt as a car ferry by Harland & Wolff Ltd, Tilbury and renamed Empire Cedric. Operated under the management of Atlantic Steam Navigation Co Ltd. Arrived on 16 September 1960 at Ghent, Belgium for scrapping.

=== Empire Celia ===
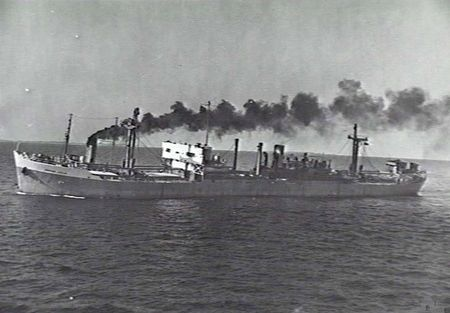
Putney Hill

Empire Celia was a 7,025 GRT cargo steamship built by C. Connell & Co. of Glasgow in 1943. The Ministry of War Transport placed her under the management of Connell & Grace Ltd. In 1948 she was sold to Putney Hill Steamships, a company controlled by the Rethymnis & Kulukundis shipbroking firm, which renamed her Putney Hill. Putney Hill Steamships placed her under the management of another R&K company, Counties Ship Management. In 1949 her name was changed again to Castle Hill. In 1950 she was transferred to a new Rethymnis & Kulukundis company, London & Overseas Freighters Ltd (LOF), which renamed her London Statesman. In 1951 LOF sold her to new owners who registered her under the Panamanian flag of convenience as Morella. Before the end of that year, the Panamanian owners sold her on to Polskie Linie Oceaniczne (Polish Ocean Lines), who renamed her Jedność ("Unity"). She was scrapped in Hong Kong in 1966.

=== Empire Celt ===
Empire Celt was an 8,032 GRT tanker which was built by Furness Shipbuilding Ltd, Haverton Hill-on-Tees. Launched on 7 October 1941 and completed in January 1942. Torpedoed on 24 February 1942 by U-158 southeast of Newfoundland (43°50′N 43°38′W). Broke in two with the bow section sinking. Stern section considered salvageable and the tug Foundation Franklin was despatched on 9 March to assist. Search for Empire Celt unsuccessful, she was presumed to have sunk.

=== Empire Celtic ===
Empire Celtic was a 4,820 GRT LST which was built by Davie Shipbuilding & Repairing Co Ltd, Lauzon, Quebec. Completed in September 1945 as HMS LST 3512. To MoWT, rebuilt as a car ferry by Harland & Wolff Ltd, Tilbury and renamed Empire Celtic. Operated under the management of Atlantic Steam Navigation Co Ltd. Scrapped in March 1965 at Spezia, Italy.

=== Empire Centaur ===
Empire Centaur was a 7,041 GRT cargo ship which was built by William Gray & Co. Ltd., West Hartlepool. Launched on 30 July 1942 and completed in October 1942. Damaged on 12 December 1942 by Italian assault craft at Algiers. To Belgian Government in 1943 and renamed Belgian Captain. Sold in 1946 to Compagnie Maritime Belge SA and renamed Capitaine Lambe. Sold in 1960 to Mullion & Co Ltd, Hong Kong, and renamed Ardee. Sold in 1964 to Sigma Shipping Co Ltd, Hong Kong, and renamed Alpha Trader. Operated under the management of Trinity Development Co Ltd, Hong Kong. Arrived in November 1967 in Shanghai for scrapping.

=== Empire Chamois ===
Empire Chamois was a 5,684 GRT cargo ship which was built by the Ames Shipbuilding and Drydock Company, Seattle. Ordered by Compagnie Générale Transatlantique, she was requisitioned in 1917 by the USSB and completed in May 1918 as Westmount. To Dimon Steamship Corp, New York in 1927 and renamed Pacific Redwood. Returned to USSB in 1932. To MoWT in 1941 and renamed Empire Chamois. Sold in 1946 to Goulandris Bros and renamed Granview. Sold in 1949 to Compagnia Maritime del Este, Panama and renamed Chamois. Scrapped in 1958 in Antwerp, Belgium. She was the last Ames built ship afloat.

=== Empire Champion ===
Empire Champion was a 512 GRT dredger which was built by William Simons & Co Ltd, Renfrew. Launched on 8 October 1945 and completed in December 1945. To the Admiralty in 1946 and renamed W 94. Renamed St Abbs (W 3) in 1946. To Ministry of Public Building & Works in 1963.

=== Empire Chancellor ===
Empire Chancellor was a 9,917 GRT tanker which was built by Sir J Laing & Sons Ltd, Sunderland. Launched in 1945, sold in 1946 to Stanhope Steamship Co Ltd and renamed Stanglen. Sold in 1952 to Minster Steamship Co Ltd and renamed Newminster. Sold in 1954 to Stanhope Steamship Co Ltd and renamed Stanpark. Scrapped in 1960 at Piraeus, Greece.

=== Empire Chapman ===
Empire Chapman was an 8,194 GRT tanker which was built by Harland & Wolff Ltd, Belfast. She was launched in 1942. Sold in 1946 to the British Tanker Co Ltd and renamed British Commando. Scrapped in 1959 in Bruges, Belgium.

=== Empire Charles ===
Empire Charles was a 244 GRT tug that was built by Henry Scarr Ltd, Hessle. Launched on 1 November 1943 and complete in January 1944. To the Admiralty in 1947 and renamed Fortitude. Sold in 1962 to D Arnold, Ashford, Middlesex. Towed in April 1964 from London to Ravenna, Italy for scrapping. Sold to Societa Esercizio Rem. Salvataggi, Italy and renamed Fortitudo. Deleted from shipping registers in 1987.

=== Empire Charmian ===
Empire Charmian was a 7,513 GRT heavy lift ship which was built by Vickers-Armstrongs Ltd, Barrow in Furness. Launched on 25 November 1942 and completed in March 1943. Sold in 1951 to Vergottis Ltd, London, and renamed Vercharmian. Grounded on 31 May 1961 at Mormugao, India. Refloated, sailed on 7 July 1961 but still leaking. Beached in Mormagao Bay. Refloated on 5 October 1961 and towed to Karachi, Pakistan. Arrived on 21 March 1962 at Chittagong, India for scrapping.

=== Empire Chaucer ===
Empire Chaucer was a 5,970 GRT cargo ship which was built by William Pickersgill & Sons Ltd, Sunderland. Launched on 18 March 1942 and completed in May 1942. Torpedoed and sunk on 17 October 1942 by U-504 south of Cape Town (40°20′S 18°30′E).

=== Empire Cheer ===
Empire Cheer was a 7,297 GRT cargo ship which was built by William Doxford & Sons Ltd, Sunderland. Launched on 9 March 1943 and completed in July 1943. Sold in 1946 to Reardon Smith Line Ltd and renamed Cornish City. Engine room fire on 8 December 1962 while in port at Aden. Towed to Bombay. Arrived on 7 March 1963 at Hong Kong for scrapping.

=== Empire Cheetah ===
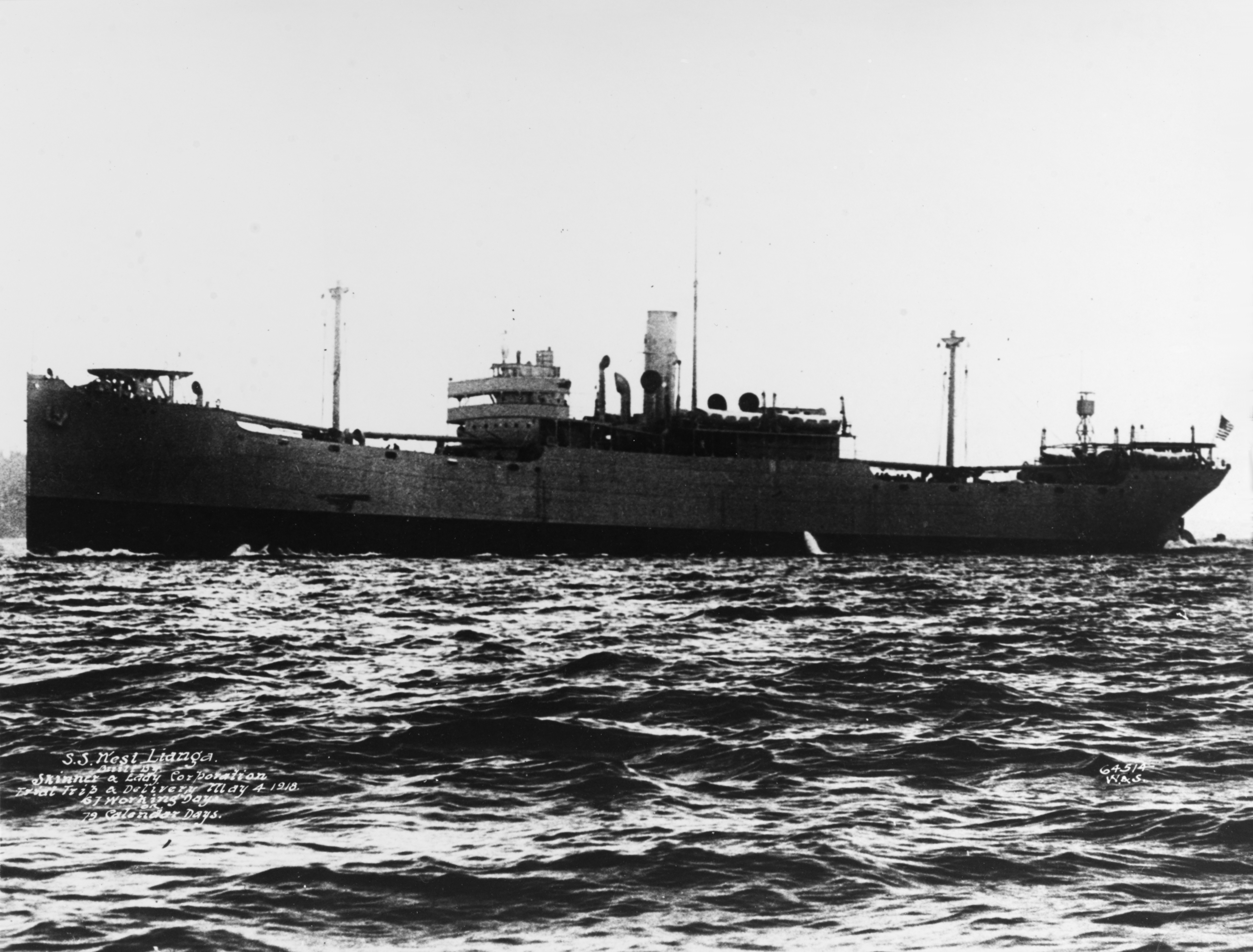
West Lianga

Empire Cheetah was a 5,506 GRT cargo ship which was built by Skinner & Eddy Corporation, Seattle. Completed in 1918 as West Lianga for the USSB. Sold in 1929 to Los Angeles Steamship Co Inc and renamed Helen Whittier. Sold in 1938 to Matson Navigation Company, San Francisco and renamed Kalani. To MoWT in 1940 and renamed Empire Cheetah. To Dutch Government in 1942 and renamed Hobbema. Torpedoed and sunk on 3 November 1942 by U-132 south of Iceland (55°38′N 39°52′W) while a member of Convoy SC 197.

=== Empire Chelmer ===
Empire Chelmer was a 2,299 GRT cargo ship which was built by Burntisland Shipbuilding Co Ltd, Burntisland. Launched in 1920 as Sydney Lasry. Sold in 1935 to Compagnie Générale Transatlantique, France and renamed Ariege. Sold in 1938 to Société Anonyme de Gerance D'Armement, France and renamed Cap Tafelneh. Sunk in an air raid at Dunkerque in June 1940. Salvaged by the Germans and renamed Carl Arp. Taken in May 1945 as war prize at Hamburg, to MoWT and renamed Empire Chelmer. Returned to SA de Gerance D'Armement in 1946 and reverted to Cap Tafelneh. Sold in 1950 to Mustafa Nuri Andak, Turkey and renamed Kandilli. Sold in 1957 to Nejat Dogan & Co, Turkey and renamed Kahraman Dogan. Reported to have been scrapped in 1972 in Turkey.

=== Empire Chelsea ===
Empire Chelsea was a 1,051 GRT coaster which was built by John Lewis & Sons, Aberdeen. Launched on 18 December 1944 and completed in February 1945. Sold in 1947 to Hull Gates Shipping Co Ltd and renamed Humbergate. Operated under the management of Craggs & Jenkins Ltd. Sold in 1955 to Efford Shipping Co Ltd and renamed Springwear. Operated under the management of Springwell Shipping Co Ltd, London. Sold in 1962 to South Star Corporation, Panama, and renamed Dumbo. Operated under the management of V & J A Ensenat, Spain. Under arrest in October 1968 at Las Palmas. Auctioned by Court Order, winning bidder Naviera del Odiel, SA but ran aground at Alcalaveras Beach, Las Palmas. Declared a constructive total loss and an offer for purchase was withdrawn. The local port authority assumed ownership. Refloated in May 1969 and beached. Auctioned on 10 December 1969, intended to be converted to a floating nightclub. Later resold to Don Martin Juantey Malvarez and scrapped.

=== Empire Cherub ===
Empire Cherub was a 263 GRT tug which was built by Hall, Russell & Co Ltd, Aberdeen. Launched on 16 March 1942 and completed in May 1942. Sold in 1946 to Lawson-Batey Tugs Ltd. Scrapped in 1970 in Blyth.

=== Empire Cherwell ===
Empire Cherwell was a 2,193 GRT cargo ship which was built by Neptun AG, Rostock. Launched in 1937 as Messina for R M Sloman Jr, Hamburg. Requisitioned by the Kriegsmarine in 1940. Taken as a war prize in May 1945 at Travemünde. To MoWT and renamed Empire Cherwell. Allocated to USSR in 1947 and renamed Polus. Removed from shipping registers in 1961.

=== Empire Cheyne ===
Empire Cheyne was a 1.051 GRT coaster which was built by John Lewis & Sons, Aberdeen. Launched on 17 October 1944 and completed in December 1944. Sold in 1946 to Ouse Steamship Co Ltd and renamed Saltfleet. Operated under the management of E P Atkinson & Sons, Goole. Ran aground on 3 October 1951 at Reedness, and rolled over the next day. Salvage commenced in December 1951 but was suspended in October 1952. When salvage recommenced in April 1953 Saltfleet had broken her back. The wreck was cut in two in March 1954, with the bow section raised on 28 May 1954 and scrapped. The stern section was refloated in September 1954 and moved upriver, it was scrapped in October 1954.

=== Empire Chief ===
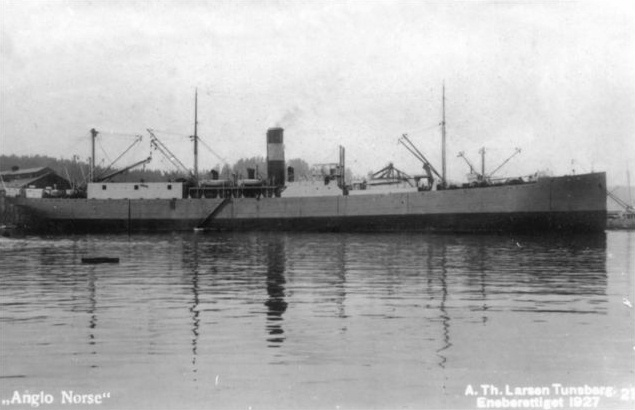
Anglo-Norse

Empire Chief was an 8,040 GRT tanker which was built by Palmers Ltd, Newcastle upon Tyne. Launched in 1897 as Montcalm for Beaver Line. Passed to Canadian Pacific Steamships in 1903 when Beaver Line was taken over. Requisitioned in 1914 by the Admiralty and converted to a dummy warship HMS Audacious. Intended use as a blockship in 1915 but later converted to a stores ship. To the British Shipping Controller in 1916 and converted to a tanker. Operated under the management of the Anglo-Saxon Petroleum Company and renamed Crenella. Torpedoed in November 1917 but managed to reach a port, subsequently repaired. Sold in 1919 to Anglo-Saxon Petroleum and then in 1920 to Runciman & Co but laid up. Sold in 1923 to C Neilson & Co, Norway, and renamed Rey Alfonso. Converted to a whale oil depot ship. Sold in 1927 and renamed Anglo-Norse, flying the British flag. Sold in 1929 to Falkland Whaling Company. Rebuilt as a pelagic whaler in Gothenburg and renamed Polar Chief. Operated under the management of the South Georgia Company. Laid up in Tønsberg in September 1939. Escaped to the UK before the German invasion of Norway. To MoWT and renamed Empire Chief. Aground on 16 January 1942 at Reykjavík. Refloated on 7 March 1942 and temporary repairs were made. Towed to the UK in May 1942. To Falkland Whaling Company in August 1946 and renamed Polar Chief. Arrived in April 1952 at Dalmuir for scrapping. Hulk towed to Troon in July 1952 for demolition.

=== Empire Chieftain ===
Empire Chieftain was a 9,904 GRT cargo liner which was built by Furness Shipbuilding Ltd, Haverton Hill-on-Tees. Launched on 20 May 1943 and completed in October 1943. Sold in 1946 to Royal Mail Lines and renamed Loch Ryan. Sold in 1960 to Argonaut Shipping & Trading Co Ltd, London, and renamed Fair Ryan. Arrived on 2 July 1960 at Nagasaki for scrapping.

=== Empire Chivalry ===
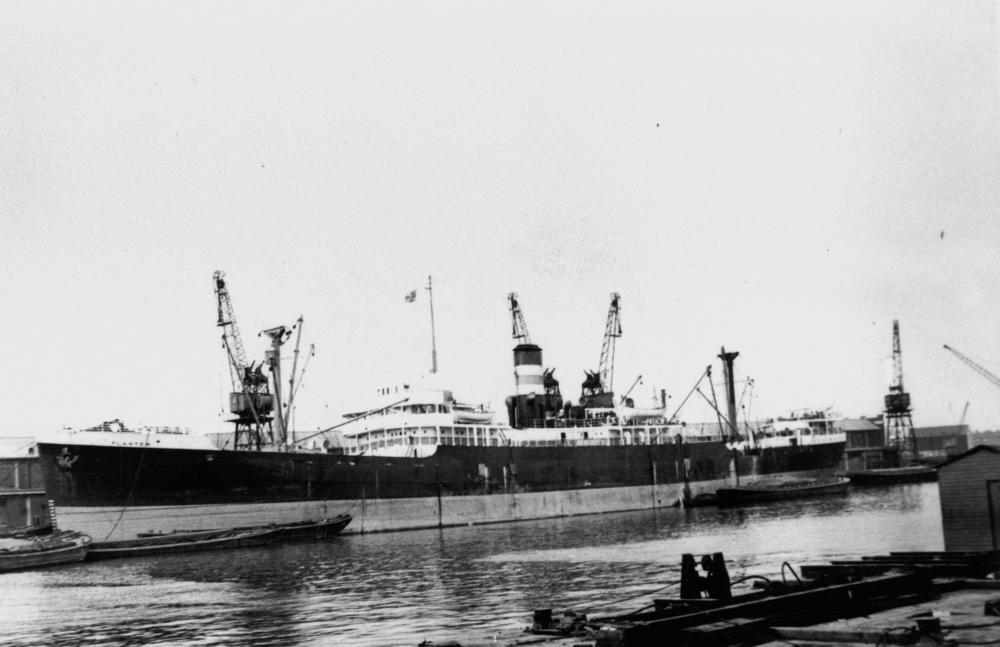
Planter

Empire Chivalry was a 6,007 GRT cargo ship which was built by Swan Hunter & Wigham Richardson Ltd, Newcastle upon Tyne. Launched in 1937 as Inkosi for T & J Harrison Ltd, Liverpool. Hired on 15 August 1940 by Royal Navy for use as an ocean boarding vessel. Sunk in an air raid on 7 September 1940 at Royal Albert Dock, London. Refloated on 4 October 1940 and rebuilt. To MoWT and renamed Empire Chivalry. To T & J Harrison in 1946 and renamed Planter. Scrapped in 1958 at Ghent, Belgium.

=== Empire Chlorine ===
Empire Chlorine was a 307 GRT coastal tanker which was built by D W Kremer Sohn, Elmshorn. Launched in 1939 as cargo ship Trave for Lübeck-Wyberger Dampfschiff Gesellschaft, Lübeck. Taken in May 1945 as war prize at Flensburg in a damaged condition. Towed to Methil. To MoWT in October 1945. Laid up until 1952 when converted for the carriage of corrosive acids. Returned to West German Government in 1953 and then to Lübeck-Wyberger Dampfschiff Gesellschaft and renamed Trave. Sold in 1954 to A/S Klorslag, Norway, and renamed Hybo, then Hyborg and Uniklor. A new diesel engine was fitted in 1963. Sold in 1978 to F Skeine, Norway, and renamed Frisnes.

=== Empire Christopher ===
Empire Christopher was a 275 GRT tug which was built by Cochrane & Sons Ltd, Selby. Launched on 9 May 1944 and completed in August 1944. Struck a mine and sank on 21 April 1946 in Gulf of Martaban (14°09′N 98°03′E).

=== Empire Chub ===
Empire Chub was a 716 GRT ferry which was built by Swan Hunter & Wigham Richardson Ltd, Newcastle upon Tyne. Launched on 10 September 1942 and completed in October 1942. Operated under the management of Townsend Brothers Ltd. Sold in 1962 to Payardi Shipping & Contracting Co, Panama, and renamed Panther. Converted to a barge in 1968 in Italy.

=== Empire Chuzzlewit ===
Empire Chuzzlewit was a 322 GRT coaster which was built by Richards Ironworks Ltd, Lowestoft. Launched on 14 October 1943, she was completed as RFA Chattenden, an ammunition carrier for the Royal Fleet Auxiliary. Laid up in Portchester Creek, Portsmouth from 1951 to 1967. Sold in 1967 to HG Pounds, Portsmouth. Sold in 1969 to T Bowen & P Caines and converted to a suction dredger, renamed Mark Bowen. Laid up in River Itchen, Southampton c1978 and later scrapped.

=== Empire Citizen (I) ===
Empire Citizen was a 4,683 GRT cargo liner which was built by Reiherstieg Schiffswerfte und Maschinenfabrik, Hamburg. Launched in 1922 as Wahehe for the Woermann Line, Hamburg. Sailed from Hamburg prior to the declaration of war in 1939, to refuge in Vigo, Spain. Sailed from Vigo on 10 February 1940 but intercepted on 21 February 1940 by HMS Kimberley and HMS Manchester. The crew was told that if they scuttled the ship no attempt would be made to rescue them. Escorted to Kirkwall. To MoWT and renamed Empire Citizen. Torpedoed and sunk on 3 February 1941 by U-107 at 58°12′N 23°22′W while a member of Convoy OB 279.

=== Empire Citizen (II) ===
Empire Citizen was a 2,066 GRT collier which was built by Grangemouth Dockyard Co Ltd in 1943. Sold in 1946 and renamed Queenworth. Scrapped in 1960.

=== Empire City ===
Empire City was a 7,205 GRT cargo ship which was built by William Doxford & Sons Ltd, Sunderland. Launched on 15 July 1943 and completed in November 1943. Torpedoed and sunk on 6 August 1944 by U-198 in the Mozambique Channel (11°33′S 41°25′E).

=== Empire Claire ===
Empire Claire was a 5,613 GRT cargo ship which was built by William Hamilton & Co Ltd, Port Glasgow. Launched in 1919 as Clan Matheson for Clan Line Steamers Ltd. Sold in 1948 to British & South American Steam Navigation Co and renamed Harmodius. Operated under the management of Houston Line Ltd. Sold in 1951 to Heron Shipping Ltd, London, and renamed Claire T. To Romney Steamship Co in 1953 and then sold to Ministry of Transport (MoT) in 1955. Loaded with obsolete war materials and towed out of Stranraer on 27 July 1955. Scuttled in the Atlantic Ocean a few days later.

=== Empire Clansman ===
Empire Clansman was a 2,065 GRT collier which was built by Grangemouth Dockyard Co Ltd, Grangemouth. Launched on 10 October 1942 and completed in December 1942. Ran aground on 18 January 1945 on South Carr Rocks, North Berwick. Broke into three parts. Refloated on 14 February 1945 and anchored off Granton and later towed to Leith where she was drydocked on 14 March 1945. Towed to the Tyne on 22 March 1945 and repaired. Sold in 1948 to Sheaf Steamship Co Ltd and renamed Sheaf Field. Operated under the management of W A Souter & Co Ltd, Newcastle upon Tyne. Sold in 1951 to William Cory & Son Ltd and renamed Corfield. Sold in 1964 to M Scufalos, Greece, and renamed Spyros Armenakis. Ran aground on 13 February 1965 on Nolle Sandbank, off Vlissingen, Netherlands, she broke into three pieces and sank the following day.

=== Empire Clara ===
Empire Clara was a 292 GRT tug which was built by Cochrane & Sons Ltd, Selby. Launched on 28 April 1945 and completed in October 1945. Sold in 1947 to United Towing Co Ltd and renamed Airman. A new triple expansion steam engine was fitted in 1949. Scrapped in November 1967 in Blyth.

=== Empire Clarendon ===
Empire Clarendon was an 8,577 GRT refrigerated cargo liner which was built by Harland & Wolff Ltd, Belfast. Launched on 14 May 1945 and completed in October 1945. Sold in 1947 to Blue Star Line Ltd. Renamed Tuscan Star, then renamed Timaru Star in 1948. Sold in 1950 to Lamport & Holt Line Ltd. Renamed California Star in 1959. Reported sold in 1967 for conversion to a fish factory ship, but arrived on 21 April 1969 at Kaohsiung for scrapping.

=== Empire Clarion ===
Empire Clarion was a 7,031 GRT cargo ship which was built by William Gray & Co. Ltd., West Hartlepool. Launched on 30 June 1942 and completed in September 1942. Sold in 1946 to Pool Shipping Co Ltd, and renamed Cedarpool. Operated under the management of Sir R Ropner & Co Ltd. Arrived on 20 July 1959 at Hamburg for scrapping.

=== Empire Claymore ===
Empire Claymore was a 7,050 GRT cargo ship which was built by Sir W G Armstrong, Whitworth & Co (Shipbuilders) Ltd, Newcastle upon Tyne. Launched on 19 November 1942 and completed in January 1943. Sold to the Belgian Government in 1943 and renamed Belgian Crew. Sold in 1946 to Compagnie Maritime Belge SA and renamed Capitaine Parlet. Sold in 1960 to Mullion & Co, Hong Kong, and renamed Ardenode. Sold in 1966 to Tynlee Navigation Co, Panama and renamed Tynlee. Scrapped at Kaohsiung in July 1969.

=== Empire Cliff ===
Empire Cliff was an 873 GRT coaster which was built by Goole Shipbuilding & Repairing Co Ltd, Goole. Launched on 16 October 1940 and completed in December 1940. Sold in 1945 to South Georgia Co Ltd and renamed Marna. Operated under the management of Christian Salvesen & Co, Leith. Sold in 1960 to Hargreaves Coal and Shipping Co Ltd, London, and renamed Harcliff. Sold in 1963 to Companhia Cia. Portugesa de Navegação, Panama and renamed Ricardo Manuel. Sank on 4 September 1971 at entrance to Casablanca harbour after collision with MV Zagora.

=== Empire Clive ===
Empire Clive was a 7,069 GRT cargo ship which was built by Cammell Laird & Co Ltd, Birkenhead. Launched on 28 July 1941 and completed in August 1941. Sold in 1946 to Alexander Shipping Co Ltd and renamed Charlebury. Operated under the management of Houlder Bros. Sold in 1958 to Red Anchor Line Ltd, Hong Kong, and renamed Isabel Erica. Sold in 1964 to St Merryn Shipping Co, operated under the management of C Moller, Hong Kong. Scrapped in Hong Kong in August 1969.

=== Empire Cloud ===
Empire Cloud was a 5,969 GRT cargo ship which was built by William Pickersgill & Sons Ltd, Sunderland. Launched on 27 December 1940 and completed in April 1941. Torpedoed on 9 May 1941 by U-201 east of Cape Farewell, Greenland while on maiden voyage as part of Convoy OB 318. Taken in tow by tug Thames and towed to the Clyde, a journey which took nearly two weeks. Beach at Kames Bay, Isle of Bute. Refloated on 22 June 1941 and sent to drydock for repairs. Torpedoed on 19 August 1942 by U-564 some 80 miles (130 km) off Trinidad. Taken in tow by the Dutch tug Roode Zee but sank on 21 August 1942 at 10°54′N 62°10′W.

=== Empire Clough ===
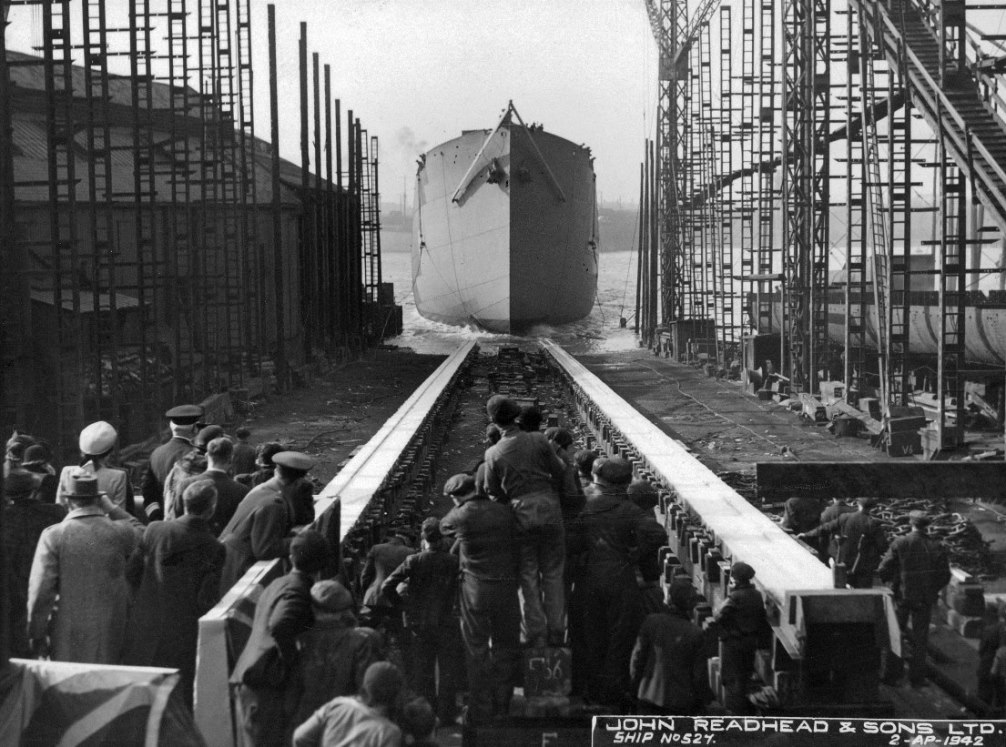
Launch of Empire Clough.

Empire Clough was a 6,147 GRT cargo ship which was built by John Readhead & Sons Ltd, South Shields. Launched on 2 April 1942 and completed in June 1942. Torpedoed on 10 June 1942 and sunk by U-94 in mid-Atlantic (51°50′N 35°00′W) while on maiden voyage as part of Convoy ONS 100.

=== Empire Clyde (I) ===
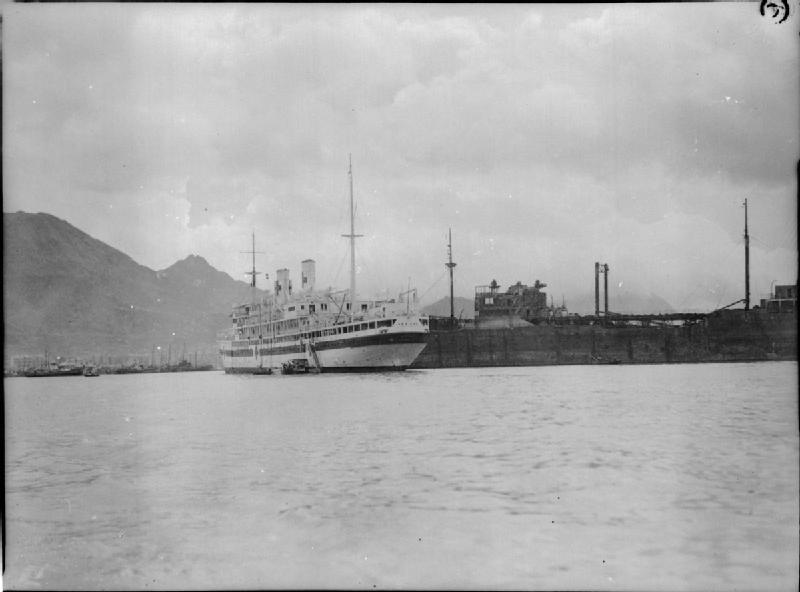
RFA Maine

Empire Clyde was a 7,515 GRT ocean liner which was built as Leonardo da Vinci in 1924 for Transatlantica Italiana Societa di Navigazione, Genoa. She was captured on 14 February 1941 at Kismayu, Italian Somaliland. To MoWT and renamed Empire Clyde. Used as a hospital ship. To Royal Fleet Auxiliary in 1947. Renamed Maine in 1948. Scrapped at Hong Kong in 1953.

=== Empire Clyde (II) ===
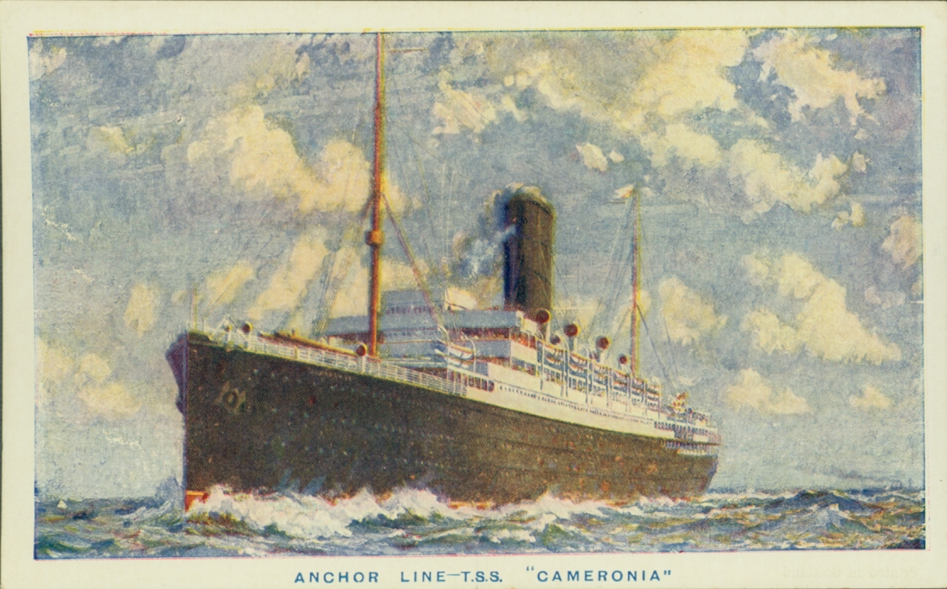
Cameronia

Empire Clyde was a 16,854 GRT ocean liner which was built by William Beardmore & Co Ltd, Port Glasgow. Launched in 1920 as Cameronia for Anchor Lines. Requisitioned in 1941 as a troopship. Torpedoed on 22 December 1942 northeast of Algiers (37°03′N 05°24′E) but reached port and repaired. Laid up in 1945, returned to trooping duties in 1947. Refitted in July 1948. To MoT in 1953 and renamed Empire Clyde. Arrived on 22 October 1957 at Newport for scrapping.

=== Empire Clydesdale ===
Empire Clydesdale was a 1,747 GRT suction hopper dredger which was built by Lobnitz & Co Ltd, Renfrew. Laid down as Mazatlan for the Mexican Government. Requisitioned by MoWT while under construction and launched on 30 October 1944 as Empire Clydesdale. Sold in 1946 to Secretario de Marina, Mexican Government and renamed Tuxpam. Reported to have been scrapped in 1970.

== See also ==
The above entries give a precis of each ship's history. For a fuller account see the linked articles.

== Sources ==
- Mitchell, W H; Sawyer, L A (1990). The Empire Ships (Second ed.). London, New York, Hamburg, Hong Kong: Lloyd's of London Press Ltd. ISBN 1-85044-275-4.
