= List of shipwrecks in 1951 =

The list of shipwrecks in 1951 includes ships sunk, foundered, grounded, or otherwise lost during 1951.

table of contents
1951
Jan	Feb	Mar	Apr
May	Jun	Jul	Aug
Sep	Oct	Nov	Dec
Unknown date

== January ==
=== 1 January ===
List of shipwrecks: 1 January 1951
Ship	State	Description
"St. Richard"	Canada	The 131-foot (40 m) fishing vessel foundered on the Grand Banks. Crew rescued.

=== 3 January ===
List of shipwrecks: 3 January 1951
Ship	State	Description
Palana	United Kingdom	The cargo ship ran aground on Pine Peak Island, Northumberland Islands, Australia. Refloated on 5 January.

=== 5 January ===
List of shipwrecks: 5 January 1951
Ship	State	Description
Arion	Greece	The commercial vessel – a former PCE-842-class patrol craft – was wrecked off Port Lyautey, Morocco.

=== 7 January ===
List of shipwrecks: 7 January 1951
Ship	State	Description
Monty	Norway	The CHANT capsized and sank in the North Sea 4 nautical miles (7.4 km) off the Torungen Lighthouse. She was on a voyage from "Hervoya" to Trondheim.
HTMS Prasae	Royal Thai Navy	HTMS Prasae Korean War: The Bangpakong-class frigate was wrecked on the east coast of Korea and scuttled after running aground after being shelled by North Korean shore batteries.

=== 8 January ===
List of shipwrecks: 8 January 1951
Ship	State	Description
Monty	Norway	The Channel Tanker capsized and sank near Torungen Lighthouse, Arendal, Norway.

=== 9 January ===
List of shipwrecks: 9 January 1951
Ship	State	Description
St. Leander	United Kingdom	The 181.8-foot (55.4 m), 658-ton trawler struck the anchored trawler Davy (United Kingdom) in The Humber. Davy made it to a dock. St. Leander drifted to Barton Ness and was taken in tow but capsized after grounding on the Hessle Sands, a total loss. After several failed salvage attempts the wreck was blown up on 31 March 1952.

=== 16 January ===
List of shipwrecks: 16 January 1951
Ship	State	Description
George Washington	United States	The passenger ship caught fire at Baltimore, Maryland. She was consequently scrapped.

=== 17 January ===
List of shipwrecks: 17 January 1951
Ship	State	Description
Tapti	United Kingdom	The cargo ship ran aground off the Isle of Mull, Inner Hebrides. Declared a total loss, she sank on 22 January. She was on a voyage from the River Irwell to the River Tyne.

=== 18 January ===
List of shipwrecks: 18 January 1951
Ship	State	Description
Eminent	United Kingdom	The Modified-Stella type tug was severely damaged by fire at Bermuda. She was subsequently repaired and returned to service.

=== 20 January ===
List of shipwrecks: 20 January 1951
Ship	State	Description
Bogdan	United States	The 15-gross register ton, 39-foot (11.9 m) fishing vessel was lost after she blew away from her anchorage and drifted off toward Mountain Cape on Nagai Island in the Territory of Alaska's Shumagin Islands.

=== 22 January ===
List of shipwrecks: 22 January 1951
Ship	State	Description
Bie	Sweden	The cargo ship caught fire in the North Sea and was abandoned 100 nautical miles (190 km) north of Terschelling, Netherlands. All bar one of the twenty crew were rescued by the ocean liner Washington (United States).

=== 23 January ===
List of shipwrecks: 23 January 1951
Ship	State	Description
Barnes	United Kingdom	The tug sank in the River Thames near Blackfriars Bridge, London.

=== 28 January ===
List of shipwrecks: 28 January 1951
Ship	State	Description
Castledore	United Kingdom	The Liberty ship sank off the coast of Spain. All 38 crew rescued by a French trawler.
Janko	Panama	The tanker broke in two off Cape Finisterre, Spain. Stern half taken in tow by the tug Bustler (United Kingdom). Bow section also remained afloat and was taken under tow. Ship declared a constructive total loss and scrapped.

=== 29 January ===
List of shipwrecks: 29 January 1951
Ship	State	Description
USS Independence	United States Navy	The decommissioned Independence-class light aircraft carrier was scuttled in the Pacific Ocean off California's Farallon Islands after use as a target in the 1946 Operation Crossroads atomic bomb tests.
Nuevo Bilbao	Spain	The fishing trawler collided with another vessel, broke in two and sank at Gijón with the loss of three of her crew.
Talisima	United Kingdom	The tanker was wrecked on the coast of Galicia, Spain. Her crew were rescued.

=== Unknown date ===
List of shipwrecks: Unknown date in January 1951
Ship	State	Description
VIC 20	Gambia Colony and Protectorate	The VIC-type lighter was driven ashore in the Casamance River. She was on a voyage from Bathurst to "Bissao". She was refloated on 25 January and towed in to Zighinkor, but was deleted from the shipping registers that year.

== February ==
=== 1 February ===
List of shipwrecks: 1 February 1951
Ship	State	Description
Eleth	United Kingdom	The coaster capsized and sank in the Irish Sea 12 nautical miles (22 km) east of Carlingford, County Louth, Ireland. She was on a voyage from Birkenhead, Cheshire to Dundalk, County Louth.

=== 2 February ===
List of shipwrecks: 2 February 1951
Ship	State	Description
Eleth	United Kingdom	The cargo ship sank in the Irish Sea with the loss of nine of her ten crew.
USS Partridge	United States Navy	Korean War: The YMS-1-class minesweeper struck a mine and sank at Wonsan, Korea (38°10′N 128°38′E). 4 killed (2 Japanese civilian Mess Boys), 7 wounded, 4 missing.

=== 4 February ===
List of shipwrecks: 4 February 1951
Ship	State	Description
Junior	United States	The 11-gross register ton, 35.1-foot (10.7 m) fishing vessel was destroyed by fire in Carroll Inlet (55°17′N 131°30′W) in Southeast Alaska.

=== 14 February ===
List of shipwrecks: 14 February 1951
Ship	State	Description
NRP Garo	Portuguese Navy	The gunboat sank in a collision with another Portuguese warship off Portugal.

=== 16 February ===
List of shipwrecks: 16 February 1951
Ship	State	Description
Deeness	United Kingdom	The cargo ship ran aground off Cherbourg, France.

=== 18 February ===
List of shipwrecks: 18 February 1951
Ship	State	Description
Nairana	United Kingdom	The passenger/cargo ship was driven ashore in a storm off Port Melbourne, Victoria, Australia. Wreck scrapped in situ.

=== 20 February ===
List of shipwrecks: 20 February 1951
Ship	State	Description
Duc de Normandie	France	The fishing vessel capsized off the Dutch coast with the loss of 22 of her 24 crew. Survivors were rescued by the Victory ship American Counselor (United States).
Florentine	Norway	The Liberty ship capsized and sank in the Pacific Ocean (22°04′N 140°30′E). Twenty-one of her 33 crew were rescued by the Victory ship Silvermaple (United Kingdom). The other twelve were rescued from a lifeboat by USS Tekelma (United States Navy) on 25 February. Florentine was on a voyage from Manila, Philippines to San Francisco, California, United States.
Marga	Norway	The cargo ship was abandoned off the coast of Finistère, France. Her crew were rescued by a Dutch ship.

=== 26 February ===
List of shipwrecks: 26 February 1951
Ship	State	Description
HDMS Raagen	Royal Danish Navy	The torpedo boat collided with MTB 5518 (Royal Navy) and sank in the North Sea. Subsequently salvaged, repaired and returned to service.

=== Unknown date ===
List of shipwrecks: Unknown date in February 1951
Ship	State	Description
Frosty	United States	The 6-gross register ton, 26.4-foot (8.0 m) fishing vessel was wrecked on the beach in Knudson Cove (55°28′30″N 131°48′00″W) in Southeast Alaska.

== March ==
=== 10 March ===
List of shipwrecks: 10 March 1951
Ship	State	Description
Helen Lee	United States	The 20-gross register ton, 48.8-foot (14.9 m) tug sank near Romanzof (61°49′N 166°06′W), Territory of Alaska.

=== 14 March ===
List of shipwrecks: 14 March 1951
Ship	State	Description
Ulster Duke	United Kingdom	The ferry sank in the Bay of Biscay.

=== 16 March ===
List of shipwrecks: 16 March 1951
Ship	State	Description
Montallegro	Italy	The T2 tanker exploded and broke in two at Naples, Italy. She subsequently was repaired and returned to service.

=== 21 June ===
List of shipwrecks: 21 June 1928
Ship	State	Description
Puget	United States	The 175-gross register ton, 126.5-foot (38.6 m) barge sank at Ward Cove, Territory of Alaska.

=== 24 March ===
List of shipwrecks: 24 March 1951
Ship	State	Description
Ramses II	Egypt	The cargo ship ran aground in the River Severn at Sharpness, Gloucestershire, United Kingdom.

== April ==
=== 3 April ===
List of shipwrecks: 3 April 1951
Ship	State	Description
Ketos	United Kingdom	The refrigerated cargo ship, a Design 1015 ship, sank following an explosion in her engine room whilst off the coast of Brazil (2°25′N 30°20′W). All 41 crew rescued by Castelverde (Italy).

=== 8 April ===
List of shipwrecks: 8 April 1951
Ship	State	Description
Pearl	United States	The 22-gross register ton, 49-foot (14.9 m) tug sank in Christie Passage on the coast of British Columbia in Canada.

=== 9 April ===
List of shipwrecks: 9 April 1951
Ship	State	Description
Pégase	French Navy	The abandoned hulk of the Redoutable-class submarine was grounded on a shoal in the Mekong Delta at the mouth of the Bassac River in French Indochina to serve as a landmark.

=== 12 April ===
List of shipwrecks: 12 April 1951
Ship	State	Description
Oljaren	Sweden	The tanker ran aground on the Pentland Skerries, Orkney Islands, United Kingdom.

=== 13 April ===
List of shipwrecks: 13 April 1951
Ship	State	Description
Arab Trader	Aden	The Isles-class trawler ran aground at Mombasa, Kenya, a total loss.

=== 16 April ===
List of shipwrecks: 16 April 1951
Ship	State	Description
HMS Affray	Royal Navy	The Amphion-class submarine foundered in the Hurds Deep, off Alderney, Channel Islands.

=== 20 April ===
List of shipwrecks: 20 April 1951
Ship	State	Description
Esso Greensboro	United States	The T2 tanker collided with the tanker Esso Suez (United States) in the Gulf of Mexico 200 nautical miles (370 km) south of Morgan City, Louisiana. She caught fire and was abandoned. The fires were extinguished as she settled deeper into the water. She was taken in tow by the tanker Virginia (United States), arriving at Galveston, Texas on 27 April. She was repaired and lengthened in May 1952 and returned to service as Esso San Juan.

=== 27 April ===
List of shipwrecks: 27 April 1951
Ship	State	Description
RFA Bedenham	Royal Navy	The armament carrier was destroyed in an explosion of ordnance at Gibraltar. 9 killed. Raised in 1952, towed to the Tyne and scrapped at Dunston.

== May ==
=== 3 May ===
List of shipwrecks: 3 May 1951
Ship	State	Description
Bore III	Finland	The cargo ship struck a mine and sank off Cordouan, France.

=== 5 May ===
List of shipwrecks: 5 May 1951
Ship	State	Description
JML 306	Republic of Korea Navy	Korean War: The JML 301-class patrol ship was sunk by a mine off Chinnampo, North Korea. 6 killed, 18 wounded.
HDMS Y 341	Royal Danish Navy	The cutter collided with the steamship Beatrix (Denmark) and sank at Copenhagen. Later salvaged, repaired and returned to service.

=== 8 May ===
List of shipwrecks: 8 May 1951
Ship	State	Description
"Aylesby"	United Kingdom	The 87.2-foot (26.6 m) fishing vessel caught fire 70 miles north northeast of Smith's Knoll. Crew taken off by "Ise of Wight" (United Kingdom). Sank the next day.

=== 10 May ===
List of shipwrecks: 10 May 1951
Ship	State	Description
Marrawah	Australia	The hulk was scuttled by the Royal Australian Air Force off Sydney, Australia.

=== 14 May ===
List of shipwrecks: 14 May 1951
Ship	State	Description
C-S-F	United States	The 70-gross register ton, 63.4-foot (19.3 m) fishing vessel was wrecked a location identified as "Leonard Island" in the Bering Sea, probably a reference to Leonard Harbor (55°08′N 162°27′W) near Cold Bay, Territory of Alaska.
USS Valcour	United States Navy	The Barnegat-class seaplane tender collided with the collier Thomas Tracy off Cape Henry, Virginia, and caught fire, with the loss of 36 of her crew killed and 16 injured. She was repaired and returned to service.

=== 17 May ===
List of shipwrecks: 17 May 1951
Ship	State	Description
Adour	French Navy	First Indochina War: The Laita-class LST was sunk by an explosion at Nha Trang, Vietnam, French Indochina. 24 crewmen and 54 troops killed. The ship was raised, repaired and returned to service as an accommodations ship.
Mary R	United States	The 13-gross register ton, 33.4-foot (10.2 m) fishing vessel was destroyed by fire in Veta Bay (55°21′N 133°39′W) in Southeast Alaska.

=== 24 May ===
List of shipwrecks: 24 May 1951
Ship	State	Description
Nicolaou Georgios	Greece	The Liberty ship caught fire in the Red Sea and was abandoned. Although declared a constructive total loss, she was subsequently repaired and returned to service.
Unknown schooners	Korean People's Army Naval Force	Korean War: Four minelaying schooners were sunk by USS Manchester and USS Brinkley Bass (both United States Navy). 11 killed, 1 wounded.

== June ==
=== 10 June ===
List of shipwrecks: 10 June 1951
Ship	State	Description
Maharashmi	India	The coaster ran aground near the Bhaktal Fort Lighthouse, India and broke into three sections. She was on a voyage from Cochin to Bombay.

=== 14 June ===
List of shipwrecks: 14 June 1951
Ship	State	Description
Mafco 8	United States	The 7-gross register ton, 28.5-foot (8.7 m) fishing vessel sank in the southern Gulf of Alaska at 50°56′N 139°55′W, well to the west of Queen Charlotte Sound, British Columbia, Canada.
Mafco 9	United States	The 7-gross register ton, 28.5-foot (8.7 m) fishing vessel sank in the southern Gulf of Alaska at 50°56′N 139°55′W, well to the west of Queen Charlotte Sound, British Columbia, Canada.

=== 23 June ===
List of shipwrecks: 23 June 1951
Ship	State	Description
Lomen Commercial Company No. 3	United States	The 45-gross register ton, 50-foot (15.2 m) scow sank in the Bering Sea near Hooper Bay, Territory of Alaska.
Lomen Commercial Company No. 4	United States	The 43-gross register ton, 50-foot (15.2 m) scow sank in the Bering Sea near Hooper Bay, Territory of Alaska.
Lomen Commercial Company No. 5	United States	The 45-gross register ton, 50-foot (15.2 m) scow sank in the Bering Sea near Hooper Bay, Territory of Alaska.
Lomen Commercial Company No. 8	United States	The 37-gross register ton, 50-foot (15.2 m) scow sank in the Bering Sea near Hooper Bay, Territory of Alaska.
Lomen Commercial Company No. 15	United States	The 37-gross register ton, 50-foot (15.2 m) scow sank in the Bering Sea near Hooper Bay, Territory of Alaska.
Unidentified vessel	Republic of China Navy or Republic of China	Chinese Civil War: The 100 ton armed vessel – either a Republic of China Navy vessel or a civilian privateer – was sunk by No. 411, No. 413, No. 414, and No. 416 (all People's Liberation Army Navy) in Sanman Bay off the coast of China.

=== 29 June ===
List of shipwrecks: 29 June 1951
Ship	State	Description
Pamarajah	United States	The 10-gross register ton, 30-foot (9.1 m) motor passenger vessel was destroyed by fire in Yes Bay (55°55′N 131°48′W) in Southeast Alaska.

== July ==
=== 1 July ===
List of shipwrecks: 1 July 1951
Ship	State	Description
HTMS Sri Ayudhya	Royal Thai Navy	Manhattan Rebellion: The rebel-controlled coastal defence ship was shelled and bombed by government forces until she sank off Bangkok, Thailand.
HTMS Travane Vari	Royal Thai Navy	Manhattan Rebellion: The rebel-controlled patrol craft was shelled and bombed by government forces until she sank off Bangkok, Thailand.

=== 2 July ===
List of shipwrecks: 2 July 1951
Ship	State	Description
P G No. 53	United States	The 8-gross register ton, 28.7-foot (8.7 m) fishing vessel sank near Port Moller (55°59′30″N 160°34′30″W), Territory of Alaska.

=== 4 July ===
List of shipwrecks: 4 July 1951
Ship	State	Description
Peterstar	United Kingdom	The cargo ship ran aground in the South China Sea.

=== 7 July ===
List of shipwrecks: 7 July 1951
Ship	State	Description
Jargoon	United Kingdom	The coaster collided in the English Channel with Tormes (Spain) and sank 10 nautical miles (19 km) south of the Owers Lightship.

=== 12 July ===
List of shipwrecks: 12 July 1951
Ship	State	Description
Agate	United States	The 9-gross register ton, 29.2-foot (8.9 m) fishing vessel sank in Cook Inlet on the south-central coast of the Territory of Alaska.

=== 13 July ===
List of shipwrecks: 13 July 1951
Ship	State	Description
B B 1	United States	The 7-ton fishing vessel was lost overboard from the vessel Sea Lark (United States) and sank in the North Pacific Ocean about 400 nautical miles (740 km; 460 mi) southwest of Ketchikan, Territory of Alaska.
G F 1	United States	The 7-ton fishing vessel was lost overboard from the vessel Sea Lark (United States) and sank in the North Pacific Ocean about 400 nautical miles (740 km; 460 mi) southwest of Ketchikan, Territory of Alaska.
G F 6	United States	The 7-ton fishing vessel was lost overboard from the vessel Sea Lark (United States) and sank in the North Pacific Ocean about 400 nautical miles (740 km; 460 mi) southwest of Ketchikan, Territory of Alaska.

=== 17 July ===
List of shipwrecks: 17 July 1951
Ship	State	Description
G. C. Amdrup	Denmark	The 900-ton cargo ship struck a naval mine off the southern tip of Norway and sank.

=== 19 July ===
List of shipwrecks: 19 July 1951
Ship	State	Description
RFA Wave Laird	Royal Navy	The Wave-class oiler collided with the Royal Interocean Line's ocean liner Boissevain (Netherlands) off Singapore.

=== 23 July ===
List of shipwrecks: 23 July 1951
Ship	State	Description
Rubens	Belgium	The cargo ship sank off Katsu Ura, Japan (35°12′20″N 140°24′20″E). Her 41 crew were rescued.

=== 25 July ===
List of shipwrecks: 25 July 1951
Ship	State	Description
Olympic	United States	The Liberty ship ran aground north of Bombay, India. Although declared a constructive total loss, she was subsequently repaired.
Orion	United States	The Liberty ship was driven ashore on Madh Island, India whilst on a voyage from "Navalakhi" to Bombay. Although declared a constructive total loss, she was repaired.

=== 29 July ===
List of shipwrecks: 29 July 1951
Ship	State	Description
Earl	United Kingdom	The tug capsized and sank at Cardiff, Glamorgan whilst berthing the Festival of Britain ship Campania (United Kingdom). All six crew rescued.
Hilsen	Canada	The halibut-fishing vessel burned and sank off Forrester Island in Southeast Alaska. Her crew of four abandoned ship in a dory and was rescued by the fishing vessel Denny Joe United States.

== August ==
=== 3 August ===
List of shipwrecks: 3 August 1951
Ship	State	Description
Neptune	United States	The 54-gross register ton, 57.4-foot (17.5 m) motor cargo vessel sank at Niblack Point (55°33′N 132°07′W) in Clarence Strait in the Alexander Archipelago in Southeast Alaska.

=== 7 August ===
List of shipwrecks: 7 August 1951
Ship	State	Description
Flattery	United States	The 12-gross register ton, 35.9-foot (10.9 m) fishing vessel was destroyed by fire at Cordova, Territory of Alaska.
Lomen Commercial Company No. 9	United States	The 46-gross register ton, 47-foot (14.3 m) scow broke her moorings, drifted onto rocks, and was wrecked on the coast of the Territory of Alaska near Tin City and Cape Prince of Wales.

=== 9 August ===
List of shipwrecks: 9 August 1951
Ship	State	Description
Debs	United States	The 18-gross register ton, 39-foot (11.9 m) fishing vessel suffered an explosion and was destroyed by the ensuing fire in Valdez Arm (60°53′N 146°54′W) 6 nautical miles (11 km; 6.9 mi) from Valdez, Territory of Alaska. All three people aboard survived.

=== 11 August ===
List of shipwrecks: 11 August 1951
Ship	State	Description
Santos	Brazil	The ocean liner ran aground off Cabo Frio. All 263 passengers rescued by the Victory ship Cordoba (Argentina) and by Pocone (Brazil).

=== 13 August ===
List of shipwrecks: 13 August 1951
Ship	State	Description
Bess	Norway	The cargo liner sank in the North Sea with the loss of seven of the 31 people on board.

=== 15 August ===
List of shipwrecks: 15 August 1951
Ship	State	Description
TSS Wahine	New Zealand	At 05:40 a.m. the 4,436 GRT Union Steamship Company passenger ferry Wahine (meaning 'wife') ran hard aground on the Masela Island Reef off Cape Palsu in the Arafura Sea, being held as far aft as the engine room. In response to a distress call, all aboard were rescued by the Standard Vacuum Oil's tanker Stanvac Karachi and returned to Darwin. From there the men were flown in relays to their destination. Salvage attempts were unsuccessful and the vessel was abandoned as a total loss.

=== 16 August ===
List of shipwrecks: 16 August 1951
Ship	State	Description
Martha	United States	The 40-gross register ton, 60.3-foot (18.4 m) motor vessel was destroyed by fire at Nelson Lagoon, Territory of Alaska.
Smith	United States	The 94-gross register ton, 105.1-foot (32.0 m) motor vessel sank in the Gulf of Alaska off the south-central coast of the Territory of Alaska 10 nautical miles (19 km; 12 mi) east of Middleton Island.

=== 20 August ===
List of shipwrecks: 20 August 1951
Ship	State	Description
Dromus	United Kingdom	The oil tanker suffered two explosions and a fire in the small hours of the morning while loading at Pulau Bukom, Singapore. Three officers, 19 crew and five shore-based staff were killed. On 14 September she was drydocked for refitting and in due course she returned to service.

=== 21 August ===
List of shipwrecks: 21 August 1951
Ship	State	Description
Empire Defiance	United Kingdom)	The cargo ship sprang a leak and was beached at Zeebrugge, Belgium. She was being towed from Ouistreham, Calvados, France to Antwerp, Belgium for scrapping. She was later refloated and completed her voyage.

=== 22 August ===
List of shipwrecks: 22 August 1951
Ship	State	Description
USS Wisconsin	United States Navy	The Iowa-class battleship ran aground in the Hudson River at New York. Later refloated undamaged.

== September ==
=== 1 September ===
List of shipwrecks: 1 September 1951
Ship	State	Description
HMS Bagshot	Royal Navy	The Hunt-class minesweeper struck a mine and sank off Corfu, Greece.
Pelican	United States	The passenger ship capsized and sank off the Montauk Lighthouse, New York with the loss of 45 lives.

=== 3 September ===
List of shipwrecks: 3 September 1951
Ship	State	Description
Imperial Hamilton	Canada	The oil tanker was set afire by an explosion of gasoline fumes while moored at Sarnia, Ontario, Canada.

=== 4 September ===
List of shipwrecks: 4 September 1951
Ship	State	Description
Roamer	United States	The 57-gross register ton, 60.8-foot (18.5 m) motor cargo vessel was wrecked at Scraggy Point (57°20′20″N 135°43′40″W) in Salisbury Sound in the Alexander Archipelago in Southeast Alaska.

=== 5 September ===
List of shipwrecks: 5 September 1951
Ship	State	Description
"Aucuba"	United Kingdom	The 115.4-foot (35.2 m) trawler was run down and sunk by Maria Bibolini (Italy) 11 miles off Robin Hood's Bay, North Yorkshire, England. All crew saved.

=== 9 September ===
List of shipwrecks: 9 September 1951
Ship	State	Description
Star 2	United States	The 9-gross register ton, 33.5-foot (10.2 m) fishing vessel sank in the Spoon River at Yakutat Bay on the south-central coast of the Territory of Alaska.

=== 10 September ===
List of shipwrecks: 10 September 1951
Ship	State	Description
Scillonian	United Kingdom	The ferry ran ashore on the Wingletang Ledge, St Agnes, Isles of Scilly in fog. She was later refloated and continued in service.

=== 13 September ===
List of shipwrecks: 13 September 1951
Ship	State	Description
Ruth	United States	The 13-gross register ton, 32.1-foot (9.8 m) fishing vessel sank after colliding with the motor vessel Salome (United States) between Hoggatt Bay (56.7791°N 134.7199°W) and Red Bluff Bay (56.8631°N 134.7738°W) in Southeast Alaska.
Salome	United States	The 14-gross register ton, 36.3-foot (11.1 m) fishing vessel sank at Tyee in Southeast Alaska.

=== 14 September ===
List of shipwrecks: 14 September 1951
Ship	State	Description
Allenwood	Australia	Allenwood The cargo ship ran aground at Norah Head, New South Wales and was wrecked.

=== 21 September ===
List of shipwrecks: 21 September 1951
Ship	State	Description
Yonderbound	United States	The 11-gross register ton, 39-foot (11.9 m) fishing vessel was destroyed by fire in Hobo Bay, Prince William Sound, Territory of Alaska.

=== 27 September ===
List of shipwrecks: 27 September 1951
Ship	State	Description
Suaco	United States	The 42-gross register ton, 56.5-foot (17.2 m) motor vessel was wrecked on Grass Island Bar (60°15′N 145°17′W) in the Copper River Flats near Cordova, Territory of Alaska.

=== 28 September ===
List of shipwrecks: 28 September 1951
Ship	State	Description
Washington	United States	The 18-gross register ton, 44.6-foot (13.6 m) fishing vessel foundered off Douglas Island in Southeast Alaska.

== October ==
=== 1 October ===
List of shipwrecks: 1 October 1951
Ship	State	Description
Hazel M	United States	After breaking loose from her moorings at Metlakatla, Territory of Alaska, the 28-foot (8.5 m) troller sank at Driest Point (55°10′40″N 131°36′15″W) in Southeast Alaska.

=== 3 October ===
List of shipwrecks: 3 October 1951
Ship	State	Description
Saltfleet	United Kingdom	The Tudor Queen-class coaster ran aground at Reedness, Yorkshire. She rolled over on 4 October, salvage was abandoned in 1952 and the ship was scrapped in 1954.

=== 6 October ===
List of shipwrecks: 6 October 1951
Ship	State	Description
Adrias	Greece	The passenger ship was wrecked whilst on a voyage from Piraeus to Crete. All on board, over 500 people, survived.

=== 7 October ===
List of shipwrecks: 7 October 1951
Ship	State	Description
Elsie III	United States	The 9-gross register ton, 32.6-foot (9.9 m) fishing vessel sank in "Rocky Bay" in Southeast Alaska. The wreck report does not specify in which of several bodies of water with that name the sinking took place.
USS U-2513	United States Navy	The Type XXI submarine was sunk as a target in the Atlantic Ocean off Key West, Florida (24°53′N 83°15′W).

=== 12 October ===
List of shipwrecks: 12 October 1951
Ship	State	Description
Ranna	Costa Rica	The cargo ship collided with Tharros (Greece) and sank off Gothenburg, Sweden with the loss of six of her eight crew.

=== 14 October ===
List of shipwrecks: 14 October 1951
Ship	State	Description
Kyono Maru	Japan	The troopship was driven aground off Nagasaki in a typhoon.
Miss Lace	United States	The 14-gross register ton, 35.7-foot (10.9 m) fishing vessel was destroyed by fire off Steamer Point (56°13′00″N 132°42′40″W) in Clarence Strait in the Alexander Archipelago in Southeast Alaska.

=== 15 October ===
List of shipwrecks: 15 October 1951
Ship	State	Description
Beachcomber	United States	The 43-gross register ton, 58.9-foot (18.0 m) motor vessel sank on the coast of Southeast Alaska during a voyage from Yakutat to Juneau, Territory of Alaska.
Paul M	United Kingdom	The coaster collided with the trawler Rose of England (United Kingdom) and sank off the mouth of the River Humber.

=== 18 October ===
List of shipwrecks: 18 October 1951
Ship	State	Description
Laurel Ann	United States	The 9-gross register ton, 30.6-foot (9.3 m) fishing vessel was destroyed by fire at a location identified as "Ice House" in the Territory of Alaska, probably a reference to Icehouse Point (57°46′50″N 152°21′30″W) on Woody Island in the Kodiak Archipelago near Kodiak.

=== 19 October ===
List of shipwrecks: 19 October 1951
Ship	State	Description
Betty	United States	The 16-gross register ton, 43.5-foot (13.3 m) fishing vessel was lost when she struck a reef one nautical mile (1.9 km) off the east coast of "Bronson Island" – probably a reference to Brownson Island in the Alexander Archipelago – in Southeast Alaska.

=== 21 October ===
List of shipwrecks: 21 October 1951
Ship	State	Description
Pandora	United Kingdom	The coaster foundered off Whitby with the loss of all six crew. Collided with Gripfast (United Kingdom) during rescue operation.

=== 25 October ===
List of shipwrecks: 25 October 1951
Ship	State	Description
Bluebird	United Kingdom	The hydroplane sank in Coniston Water, Cumberland.

=== 29 October ===
List of shipwrecks: 29 October 1951
Ship	State	Description
Morania #130	United States	The freight barge caught fire on the Buffalo River in New York after the tug Dauntless #12 pushed it into the path of the steamer Penobscot and Penobscot collided with Morania #130. The fire killed eleven people and burned for several days.
Transpet	Panama	The T1 tanker suffered an engine room explosion off the Magdalen Islands, Nova Scotia, Canada. She was on a voyage from Montreal, Quebec to Halifax, Nova Scotia. She caught fire and was abandoned by her crew. She sank off Miscou Island on 17 November.

== November ==
=== 3 November ===
List of shipwrecks: 3 November 1951
Ship	State	Description
Jay M	United States	The 9-gross register ton, 29.1-foot (8.9 m) fishing vessel was destroyed by fire in Affleck Canal in Southeast Alaska.

=== 4 November ===
List of shipwrecks: 4 November 1951
Ship	State	Description
Maipu	Argentina	The ocean liner collided with USS General M. L. Hersey (United States Navy) and sank in the Weser Estuary. All 260 passengers and crew were rescued.
Mina Cantiquin	Spain	The coaster struck a rock 50 nautical miles (93 km) off Black Head, Devon damaging her steering gear. She was driven ashore at Lowland Point. All seventeen crew rescued by the Coverack lifeboat.

=== 5 November ===
List of shipwrecks: 5 November 1951
Ship	State	Description
Nuria R	Argentina	The cargo ship foundered in the Bay of Biscay. All 34 crew rescued by the Bibby Line ocean liner Staffordshire (United Kingdom).

=== 6 November ===
List of shipwrecks: 6 November 1951
Ship	State	Description
George Walton	United States	The Liberty ship caught fire and was abandoned 350 nautical miles (650 km) west of Cape Flattery, Washington. Although taken in tow, she sank on 18 November 40 nautical miles (74 km) north west of Cape Flattery.
São Paulo	Brazilian Navy	The decommissioned battleship sank in the Atlantic Ocean off the Azores on her way to a scrapyard with the loss of her entire caretaker crew of eight men.

=== 15 November ===
List of shipwrecks: 15 November 1951
Ship	State	Description
Jewel	United States	The 11-gross register ton, 33.7-foot (10.3 m) fishing vessel sank in Chatham Strait in the Alexander Archipelago in Southeast Alaska.

=== 17 November ===
List of shipwrecks: 17 November 1951
Ship	State	Description
Esther D	United States	The 16-gross register ton, 45.5-foot (13.9 m) fishing vessel sank on the northwest coast of Kumlik Island (56°38′N 157°24′W) off the south coast of the Alaska Peninsula in the Territory of Alaska.

=== 28 November ===
List of shipwrecks: 28 November 1951
Ship	State	Description
B-2	Spanish Navy	The decommissioned B-class submarine sank in a storm in the Cantabrian Sea off the northern coast of Spain while under tow to a shipbreaker.

=== 29 November ===
List of shipwrecks: 29 November 1951
Ship	State	Description
Lady Kathleen	Norway	The concrete ship was driven ashore in Riga Bay. She was on a voyage from Helsinki, Finland to Riga, Soviet Union. She broke in two on 1 December and was a total loss.

=== Unknown date ===
List of shipwrecks: Unknown date 1951
Ship	State	Description
HNLMS Vlieland	Royal Netherlands Navy	The minesweeper sank off New Guinea near Hollandia, Netherlands East Indies.

== December ==
=== 1 December ===
List of shipwrecks: 1 December 1951
Ship	State	Description
Exford	United States	The cargo ship was driven ashore at Vierville-sur-Mer, Calvados, France. She was broken up in situ.

=== 6 December ===
List of shipwrecks: 6 December 1951
Ship	State	Description
Sandeid	Norway	The passenger ship sank off Rennesøy with the loss of ten of her seventeen crew.

=== 12 December ===
List of shipwrecks: 12 December 1951
Ship	State	Description
Jean Marie	Belgium	The coaster foundered south of Stockholm, Sweden (58°40′N 20°30′E) after her cargo shifted. She was on a voyage from Kotka, Finland to Ostend, West Flanders, Belgium.

=== 13 December ===
List of shipwrecks: 13 December 1951
Ship	State	Description
Northern Reel	United States	The 8-gross register ton, 30.4-foot (9.3 m) fishing vessel was destroyed by fire at Wosnesenski Island (55°11′N 161°22′W) in the Pavlof Islands off the south coast of the Alaska Peninsula.

=== 14 December ===
List of shipwrecks: 14 December 1951
Ship	State	Description
Gucum Erman	Turkey	The cargo ship struck the wreck of Empire Kumari (United Kingdom) and sank in Haifa Bay, Israel.

=== 17 December ===
List of shipwrecks: 17 December 1951
Ship	State	Description
James Richardson	United States	The cargo ship ran aground at Nacqueville, France, and was severely damaged.

=== 20 December ===
List of shipwrecks: 20 December 1951
Ship	State	Description
Erria	Denmark	The cargo liner caught fire in the Columbia River at East Astoria, Oregon, United States with the loss of eleven of the 114 people on board. The severely damaged ship was later repaired and converted to a cargo ship.

=== 21 December ===
List of shipwrecks: 21 December 1951
Ship	State	Description
Edison Mariner	United States	The Liberty ship collided with Kittiwake (United Kingdom) in the Scheldt and ran aground.
Noreg	Sweden	The cargo ship ran aground on the Goodwin Sands, Kent, United Kingdom. Refloated the next day.
Porlock Hill	United Kingdom	The Liberty ship ran aground at Famagusta, Cyprus. with the loss of five of her 31 crew. The ship broke in two and was declared a total loss.

=== 25 December ===
List of shipwrecks: 25 December 1951
Ship	State	Description
Lilica	United States	The Liberty ship was driven ashore near Civitavecchia, Italy. She was later refloated but declared a constructive total loss. Subsequently repaired and returned to service as Elisa Campanella for Italian owners.

=== 26 December ===
List of shipwrecks: 26 December 1951
Ship	State	Description
ROKS Jirisan	Republic of Korea Navy	Korean War: The Baekdusan-class submarine chaser was sunk by a mine off Wonsan, Korea, lost with all 80 hands.

=== 28 December ===
List of shipwrecks: 28 December 1951
Ship	State	Description
Gemma	Netherlands	The CHANT capsized off San Sebastián, Spain and came ashore. She was on a voyage from Bilbao, Spain to London, United Kingdom. She was scrapped in situ.
San Angelo Victory	United States	The Victory ship was damaged by fire at Bremerhaven, West Germany.

=== 29 December ===
List of shipwrecks: 29 December 1951
Ship	State	Description
Zulu	United Kingdom	The VIC-type lighter departed from Carnlough, County Down for Paisley, Renfrewshire. Subsequently foundered with the loss of all hands. Wreckage from the ship washed up at Stranraer, Wigtownshire on 4 January 1952.

=== 30 December ===
List of shipwrecks: 30 December 1951
Ship	State	Description
Angelina	Hong Kong	The coaster ran aground at Chilikai, off Haipong, French Indo-China.

=== 31 December ===
List of shipwrecks: 31 December 1951
Ship	State	Description
Gemma	Netherlands	The tanker ran aground at Guéthary, France, with the loss of all seven crew.
Østhav	Norway	The tanker broke in two in the Bay of Biscay. Both halves were driven ashore.

== Unknown date ==
List of shipwrecks: Unknown date 1951
Ship	State	Description
A. H. Pitz	United States	The tug was abandoned on the Lake Superior coast of Wisconsin at the Amnicon River east of Superior, Wisconsin. She became a wreck.
British Mariner	United Kingdom	The tanker was scuttled off the coast of Sierra Leone.
