= Ceuta (disambiguation) =

Ceuta is a Spanish autonomous city located to the south of the Strait of Gibraltar, in North Africa.

Ceuta also may refer to:

== Places ==
- Ceuta, a fishing port in the Mexican state of Sinaloa
- Ceuta, a palafito village in the Lake of Maracaibo, Venezuela
- San Isidro de Ceuta, a harbor in Zulia, Venezuela
- Ceuta, a village in the province of Holguín, Cuba
- Ceuta, a village in the province of Villa Clara, Cuba
- Ceuta, a village in the department of Cundinamarca, Colombia

== Ships ==
Ceuta may also refer to:

- SS Ceuta, the name of four steamships of the Oldenburg Portuguese Line
- Italian cruiser Falco, which later served as the destroyer Ceuta in the Spanish Nationalist Navy from 1937 to 1939 and the Spanish Navy from 1939 to 1948

== Sports ==
- AD Ceuta, a former Spanish football team based in the autonomous city of Ceuta
- AD Ceuta FC, a Spanish football club
- AgD Ceuta, a former Spanish football team
- SD Ceuta, a former Spanish football team

== See also ==
- Seuta languages
- Seota, a town in India
