= Stanpark =

Stanpark was the name of a number of ships operated by the Stanhope Steamship Co Ltd.

- SS Stanpark
- MV Stanpark
