= Newminster =

Newminster may refer to

- Newminster (horse), the 1851 St. Leger winning racehorse
- New Minster, Winchester
- Newminster Abbey, Northumberland, United Kingdom
- MV Newminster a British tanker in service 1952-54
- Robert of Newminster, Roman Catholic Saint
