= SS Empire Citizen =

List of ships with the same or similar names.

Empire Citizen was the name of two ships owned by the Ministry of War Transport during the Second World War

- SS Empire Citizen (1922), ex Wahehe, captured by the Royal Navy in February 1940. Torpedoed and sunk by U-107 in February 1941.
- SS Empire Citizen (1943), a collier built in 1943, sold postwar and renamed Queenworth, Scrapped in 1960.
