= MV Willesden =

Willesden was the name of a number of ships.

- MV Willesden (1944), built in 1944 by Caledon Shipbuilding, Dundee as Empire Canning
- MV Willesden (1961), built in 1961 by Barclay, Curle & Co Ltd, Glasgow
