= Willesden (disambiguation) =

Willesden is an area of north west London.

Willesden may also refer to:

- MV Willesden (1944), ship built in 1944 by Caledon Shipbuilding, Dundee as Empire Canning
- Willesden railway station (1841–1866), a former station
- Willesden Junction station, a Network Rail station in Harlesden
- Willesden Traction Maintenance Depot, a locomotive maintenance depot
- Bishop of Willesden of the Church of England
- Municipal Borough of Willesden (1874–1965)
- Willesden F.C. (dissolved 1981), a football club
