= SS Ceuta =

Ceuta was the name of four steamships of the Oldenburg Portuguese Line (German: Oldenburg Portugiesische Dampschiffs Rhederei).

- SS Ceuta (1912), seized as a war prize in 1920
- SS Ceuta (1923), sold in 1927
- SS Ceuta (1929), seized as a war prize in 1945
- SS Ceuta (1955), sold in 1971.
