= Cornish City =

Cornish City was the name of five ships operated by Sir W R Smith & Sons Ltd (Reardon Smith Line).

- SS Cornish City (1906), captured and scuttled during the First World War
- SS Cornish City (1919), sold in 1929, seized in 1940 and placed under the management of Reardon Smith as Fort Binger until returned to owners in 1944
- MV Cornish City (1936), torpedoed and sunk by U-177 on 29 July 1943
- MV Cornish City (1943), ex Empire Cheer, managed during the Second World War and purchased in 1946, scrapped 1963
- MV Cornish City (1969), sold in 1977
