= Brownson Island =

Island in Wrangell City and Borough, Alaska, United States

Coordinates: 55.992220°N 132.180560°W

Brownson Island is located on the west side of Ernest Sound in the U.S. state of Alaska. Situated within the Alexander Archipelago, the island is 7 miles (11 km) above Onslow Point. It is 7 miles (11 km) long, 1–2 miles (1.6–3.2 km) wide and about 1,000 feet (300 m) in elevation. It is separated from Etolin Island by the narrow Canoe Passage, which is navigable only for boats. A number of small islands are southward of Brownson Island. Several rocks are viewable at low water south of the southern end of Brownson Island.
