= MV Empire Cheer =

World War II merchant ship of the United Kingdom

History
- Name: Empire Cheer (1943-46); Cornish City (1946-63)
- Owner: Ministry of War Transport (1943-45); Ministry of Transport (1945-46); Sir W Reardon Smith & Sons Ltd (1946-63)
- Operator: Sir W Reardon Smith & Sons Ltd (1943-63)
- Port of registry: (United Kingdom) Sunderland
- Builder: William Doxford & Sons Ltd
- Yard number: 702
- Launched: 9 March 1943
- Completed: July 1943
- Out of service: 8 December 1962
- Identification: Code Letters BFJJ; United Kingdom Official Number 169115
- Fate: Scrapped

General characteristics
- Tonnage: 7,297 GRT; 4,936 NRT; 10,073 DWT
- Length: 428 ft 8 in (130.66 m)
- Beam: 56 ft 5 in (17.20 m)
- Depth: 35 ft 5 in (10.80 m)
- Installed power: 2SCSA engine
- Propulsion: Screw propeller

Empire Cheer was a 7,297 GRT cargo ship which was built in 1943 by William Doxford & Sons Ltd, Sunderland. She was built for the Ministry of War Transport (MoWT) and completed in July 1943. After the Second World War she was sold to her managers, Sir William Reardon Smith & Sons Ltd, who renamed her Cornish City. On 8 December 1962 she suffered an engine room fire, after which she was scrapped in March 1963.

== Construction ==
The ship was built by William Doxford & Sons Ltd, Sunderland, as yard number 702. She was launched on 9 March 1943 and completed in July 1943.

== Dimensions ==
The ship was 428 feet 8 inches (130.66 m) long, with a beam of 56 feet 5 inches (17.20 m) and a depth of 35 feet 5 inches (10.80 m). She had a gross register tonnage (GRT) of 7,297 and a net register tonnage (NRT) of 4,936. Her deadweight tonnage (DWT) was 10,073.

== Engine ==
The ship was propelled by a 2-stroke Single Cycle Single Action diesel engine, which had three cylinders of 23 5/8 inches (60 cm) bore by 91 5/16 inches (231.9 cm) stroke.

== History ==
Empire Cheer was built for the MoWT. She was placed under the management of Sir W Reardon Smith & Sons Ltd. The United Kingdom Official Number 169115 and the Code Letters BFJJ were allocated. Her port of registry was Sunderland.

Empire Cheer was a member of a number of convoys during the Second World War.

HX 305

Convoy HX 305 departed New York on 25 August 1944 and arrived at Liverpool on 10 September. Empire Cheer was carrying general cargo bound for Methil and London.

MKS 97G

Convoy MKS 97G departed Gibraltar on 25 April 1945 bound for the United Kingdom. Empire Cheer was carrying a cargo of wheat. She was fitted with an anti-torpedo net device.

In 1946, Empire Cheer was sold to Sir W Reardon Smith & Sons Ltd who renamed her Cornish City, the fourth Reardon Smith Line ship to carry that name. She served until 1962. On 8 December, the ship was in port at Aden when a fire broke out in her engine room, killing two of her crew. Cornish City arrived at Hong Kong for scrapping on 7 March 1963.
