= SS Messina =

Cargo steamship built 1937

History
- Name: Messina (1937–45); Empire Cherwell (1945–47); Polus (1947–61)
- Owner: Robert M. Sloman Jr (1937–40); Kriegsmarine (1940–45); Ministry of War Transport (1945); Ministry of Transport (1945–47); Soviet Government (1947–61)
- Operator: Robert M. Sloman Jr (1937–40); Kriegsmarine (1940–45); F Carrick & Co Ltd (1945–47); Soviet Government (1947–61)
- Port of registry: (Nazi Germany) Hamburg (1937–40); (Nazi Germany) Hamburg (1940–45); (United Kingdom) London (1945–47); (Soviet Union) Leningrad (1947–61)
- Builder: Neptun Werft, Rostock
- Launched: 27 July 1937
- Identification: call sign DJUT (1937–45); call sign GPSZ (1945–47); UK official number 180718 (1945–47)
- Fate: unrecorded

General characteristics
- Tonnage: 2,192 GRT, 1,104 NRT, 3,040 DWT
- Length: 303.0 ft (92.4 m)
- Beam: 43.6 ft (13.3 m)
- Depth: 16.3 ft (5.0 m)
- Decks: 1
- Installed power: 312 NHP
- Propulsion: 1 × compound steam engine + geared steam turbine; 1 × screw propeller
- Speed: 12.5 knots (23.2 km/h; 14.4 mph)
- Sensors & processing systems: As built: echo sounding device; By 1939: wireless direction finding

Messina was a cargo steamship that Neptun Werft of Rostock, Germany built in 1937 for Robert M. Sloman Jr, Hamburg. In 1940 the Kriegsmarine requisitioned her. In 1945 the UK seized her as a war prize, passed to the Ministry of War Transport (MoWT) who renamed her Empire Cherwell. In 1947 she was transferred to the USSR and renamed Polus (Полюс). She may have survived until the early 1960s. Her name was removed from shipping registers in 1961 and her ultimate fate is unknown.

== Sister ships ==
Messina was the last to be built in a series of sister ships for Robert M. Sloman Jr. In 1934 Deutsche Werft of Hamburg built Alicante and H. C. Stülcken Sohn, also of Hamburg, built Savona. In 1935 Deutsche Werft built Castellon, and Neptun Werft built Catania and Malaga. In 1937 Neptun Werft built Messina.

== Description ==
Neptun Werft launched and completed Messina in 1937. Her registered length was 303.0 ft (92.4 m), her beam was 43.6 ft (13.3 m) and her depth was 16.3 ft (5.0 m). Her tonnages were 2,192 GRT and 1,104 NRT.

Like most of her sisters, Messina was propelled by a four-cylinder compound steam engine plus a Bauer-Wach exhaust steam turbine. The reciprocating engine had a stroke of 37 3/8 inches (95 cm). Its two high-pressure cylinders had a bore of 16 3/4 inches (43 cm) and two its two low-pressure cylinders had a bore of 35 7/16 inches (90.0 cm). Christiansen & Meyer of Harburg built the engines. Her combined reciprocating and turbine machinery was rated at 312 NHP.

== History ==
Robert M. Sloman Jr registered Messina in Hamburg. Her call sign was DJUT. In 1940 the Kriegsmarine requisitioned her. In May 1945 the Allies seized her as a war prize at Travemünde. She was passed to the MoWT and renamed Empire Cherwell. She was given the UK official number was 180718, her call sign was changed to GPSZ, and her port of registry was changed to London. Empire Cherwell operated under the management of F. Carrick & Co Ltd.

In 1946 Empire Cherwell was transferred to the USSR. She was renamed Полюс, and her port of registry was changed to Leningrad. Her name was transliterated as "Polus" in Lloyd's Register, although a more correct pronunciation would be "Polyus".

Lloyd's Register still recorded Polus in 1960. Her name was removed from the register in 1961.

== Bibliography ==
- Jordan, Roger W (1999). The World's Merchant Fleets, 1939: The Particulars and Wartime Fates of 6,000 Ships. London: Chatham Publishing. ISBN 1-86176-023-X.
- Mitchell, WH; Sawyer, LA (1995). The Empire Ships: A Record of British-built and Acquired Merchant Ships During the Second World War (2nd ed.). London, New York, Hamburg, Hong Kong: Lloyd's of London Press. ISBN 1-85044-275-4.
