= MV Empire Charmian =

World War II merchant ship of the United Kingdom

History
- Name: Empire Charmian (1942-51); Vercharmian (1951-62)
- Owner: Ministry of War Transport (1942-45); Ministry of Transport (1945-51); Vergottis Ltd (1951-62)
- Operator: British India Steam Navigation Co Ltd (1942-45); Haddon Steamship Co Ltd (1946-51); Vergottis Ltd (1951-62)
- Port of registry: (United Kingdom) Barrow in Furness (1943-51); (United Kingdom) London (1951-62)
- Builder: Vickers-Armstrongs Ltd
- Launched: 25 November 1942
- Completed: March 1943
- Identification: Code Letters BFDL; United Kingdom Official Number 167745
- Fate: Scrapped 1962

General characteristics
- Tonnage: 7,513 GRT; 5,133 NRT
- Length: 416 ft 0 in (126.80 m)
- Beam: 66 ft 7 in (20.29 m)
- Depth: 31 ft 0 in (9.45 m)
- Installed power: 2 SCSA diesel engine
- Propulsion: Screw propeller

Empire Charmian was a 7,513 GRT heavy lift ship which was built in 1943 by Vickers-Armstrongs, Barrow in Furness. She was built for the Ministry of War Transport (MoWT). In 1951 she was sold into merchant service and renamed Vercharmian. After running aground in 1961, she was scrapped in 1962.

== Description ==
The ship was built by Vickers Armstrongs, Barrow-in-Furness. She was launched on 25 November 1942 and completed in March 1943.

The ship was 416 feet 0 inches (126.80 m) long, with a beam of 66 feet 7 inches (20.29 m) and a depth of 31 feet 0 inches (9.45 m). She had a GRT of 7,513 and a NRT of 5,133.

The ship was propelled by a 2-stroke Single Cycle Single Action diesel engine, which had three cylinders of 23 5/8 inches (60 cm) bore by 91 5/16 inches (231.9 cm) diameter. The engine was built by William Doxford & Sons Ltd. Sunderland.

== History ==
Empire Charmian was built for the MoWT. She was placed under the management of the British-India Steam Navigation Co Ltd. Her port of registry was Barrow in Furness. The Code Letters BFDL and United Kingdom Official Number 167745 were allocated.

Empire Charmian was a member of a number of convoys during the Second World War.

MKS 19

Convoy MKS 19 departed Tripoli, Libya on 21 July 1943 and arrived at Gibraltar on 28 July. Empire Charmian joined the convoy at Algiers, Algeria on 24 July. Records are unclear as to the eventual destination of the convoy. One source states that it arrived at the Clyde on 9 August. Empire Charmian was not listed in that part of the convoy.

MKS 23

Convoy MKS 23 departed Alexandria, Egypt on 25 August 1943 and arrived at the Clyde on 14 September. Empire Charmian joined the convoy at Malta and left it at Bizerta, Tunisia.

In 1945, Empire Charmian transported a number of TIDs to Hong Kong. In February 1945, she transported TID 124 from the United Kingdom to Hong Kong. In October 1945, she transported TID 122 from Singapore to Hong Kong, and TIDs 123, 129 and 130 from Manus Island, Admiralty Islands to Hong Kong.

In 1946, management of Empire Charmian was transferred to the Hain Steamship Co Ltd. In 1951, Empire Charmian was sold to Vergottis Ltd, London and renamed Vercharmian.

On 26 July 1960, crewmember Fernando Davila was injured when he fell through an open hatch on the forecastle of Vercharmian. He sued in the United States Court of Appeals for the Fourth Circuit claiming damages for injuries suffered when he fell through the hatch. The claim was denied and an appeal was unsuccessful. On 31 May 1961, Vercharmian ran aground off Mormugao, India. She was refloated, and sailed on 7 July but was discovered to be leaking and was beached in Mormugao Bay. She was refloated on 7 October and towed to Karachi, Pakistan. She arrived on 7 March 1962 at Chittagong, India for scrapping.
