= SS Samalness =

World War II Liberty ship of the United States

History

United States
- Name: Samalness
- Ordered: as type (EC2-S-C1) hull, MC hull 1517
- Builder: J.A. Jones Construction, Brunswick, Georgia
- Cost: $1,101,409
- Yard number: 133
- Way number: 5
- Laid down: 15 January 1944
- Launched: 29 February 1944
- Sponsored by: Mrs. F.W. Prathe
- Completed: 11 March 1944
- Fate: Transferred to the British Ministry of War Transport upon completion.

United Kingdom
- Name: Samalness
- Acquired: 11 March 1944
- Identification: Call Signal: MXSW
- Fate: Sold, 30 April 1947

United Kingdom
- Name: Castledore
- Operator: Maritime Shipping & Trading Company
- Acquired: 30 April 1947
- Fate: Ran aground and sunk, 28 January 1951

General characteristics
- Class & type: Liberty ship; type EC2-S-C1, standard
- Tonnage: 10,865 LT DWT; 7,176 GRT
- Displacement: 3,380 long tons (3,434 t) (light); 14,245 long tons (14,474 t) (max)
- Length: 441 feet 6 inches (135 m) oa; 416 feet (127 m) pp; 427 feet (130 m) lwl
- Beam: 57 feet (17 m)
- Draft: 27 ft 9.25 in (8.4646 m)
- Installed power: 2 × Oil fired 450 °F (232 °C) boilers, operating at 220 psi (1,500 kPa); 2,500 hp (1,900 kW)
- Propulsion: 1 × triple-expansion steam engine, (manufactured by Filer and Stowell, Milwaukee, Wisconsin); 1 × screw propeller
- Speed: 11.5 knots (21.3 km/h; 13.2 mph)
- Capacity: 562,608 cubic feet (15,931 m^{3}) (grain); 499,573 cubic feet (14,146 m^{3}) (bale)
- Complement: 38–62 USMM; 21–40 USNAG
- Armament: Varied by ship; Bow-mounted 3-inch (76 mm)/50-caliber gun; Stern-mounted 4-inch (102 mm)/50-caliber gun; 2–8 × single 20-millimeter (0.79 in) Oerlikon anti-aircraft (AA) cannons and/or, 2–8 × 37-millimeter (1.46 in) M1 AA guns

SS Samalness was a Liberty ship built in the United States during World War II. She was transferred to the British Ministry of War Transportation (MoWT) upon completion.

== Construction ==
Samalness was laid down on 15 January 1944, under a Maritime Commission (MARCOM) contract, MC hull 1517, by J.A. Jones Construction, Brunswick, Georgia; she was sponsored by Mrs. F.W. Prathe, and launched on 29 February 1944.

== History ==
She was allocated to Haldin & Philips, on 11 March 1944. On 30 April 1947, she was sold to the Maritime Shipping & Trading Company, and renamed Castledore. On 28 January 1951, she ran aground off Spain and sank when her propeller fell off.

== Bibliography ==
- "Jones Construction, Brunswick GA". www.ShipbuildingHistory.com. 13 October 2010.
- "Liberty Ships – World War II".
- Maritime Administration. "Samalness". Ship History Database Vessel Status Card. U.S. Department of Transportation, Maritime Administration. Archived from the original on 12 December 2019.
- Davies, James (May 2004). "Specifications (As-Built)" (PDF). p. 23.
- "SS Samalness".
