= HTMS Prasae =

The following ships of the Royal Thai Navy have been named Prasae:

- HTMS Prasae (corvette), a Flower-class corvette, previously HMS Betony (K274) of the Royal Navy and HMIS Sind (K274) of the Royal Indian Navy, which beached on the east coast of Korea and was scuttled in 1951
- HTMS Prasae (PF2), a Tacoma-class frigate, previously of the United States Navy, acquired in 1951 and decommissioned in 2000
