= SS Empire Clarion =

World War II merchant ship of the United Kingdom

History
- Name: Empire Clarion (1942-46); Cedarpool (1946-59)
- Owner: Ministry of War Transport (1942-46); Pool Shipping Co Ltd (1946-59)
- Operator: Sir R Ropner & Sons Ltd (1942-48); Australian Shipping Board (1948-51); BHP Shipping Ltd (1951-55); Sir R Ropner & Sons Ltd (1955-59)
- Port of registry: (United Kingdom) West Hartlepool (1942-46); United Kingdom (1946-59)
- Builder: William Gray & Co. Ltd.
- Launched: 30 June 1942
- Completed: September 1942
- Identification: Code Letters BDZD; United Kingdom Official Number 168944
- Fate: Scrapped

General characteristics
- Type: Cargo ship
- Tonnage: 7,031 GRT; 4,916 NRT
- Length: 431 ft 5 in (131.50 m)
- Beam: 56 ft 2 in (17.12 m)
- Depth: 35 ft 2 in (10.72 m)
- Installed power: Triple expansion steam engine
- Propulsion: Screw propeller

Empire Clarion was a 7,031 GRT cargo ship which was built in 1942 by William Gray & Co. Ltd., West Hartlepool for the Ministry of War Transport (MoWT). In 1946 she was sold and renamed Cedarpool. She served until 1959, when she was scrapped.

== Description ==
The ship was built by William Gray & Co Ltd, West Hartlepool. She was launched on 30 June 1942 and completed in September.

The ship was 431 feet 5 inches (131.50 m) long, with a beam of 56 feet 2 inches (17.12 m) and a depth of 35 feet 2 inches (10.72 m). She had a GRT of 7,031 and a NRT of 4,916.

The ship was propelled by a triple expansion steam engine, which had cylinders of 24 1/2 inches (62 cm), 39 inches (99 cm) and 70 inches (180 cm) diameter by 48 inches (120 cm) stroke. The engine was built by the Central Marine Engine Works, West Hartlepool.

== History ==
Empire Clarendon was built for the MoWT. She was placed under the management of Sir R Ropner & Sons Ltd. Her port of registry was West Hartlepool. The Code Letters BDZD and United Kingdom Official Number 168944 were allocated.

Empire Clarion was a member of a number of convoys during the Second World War.

UR 46

Convoy UR 46 departed from Loch Ewe on 18 October 1942 and arrived at Reykjavík, Iceland on 22 October.

JW 52

Convoy JW 52 departed from Liverpool on 17 January 1943 and arrived at the Kola Inlet on 27 January. Empire Clarion was carrying the convoy's Commodore.

RA 53

Convoy RA 52 departed from the Kola Inlet on 1 March 1943 and arrived at Loch Ewe on 14 March.

HX 239

Convoy HX 239 departed from New York on 13 May 1943 and arrived at Liverpool on 28 May. Empire Clarion joined the convoy from Halifax, Nova Scotia. She was carrying a cargo of grain and lorries, she was bound for Avonmouth, Somerset.

In 1946, Empire Clarion was sold to the Pool Shipping Co Ltd. She was renamed Cedarpool, remaining under Ropner's Management. On 21 December 1948, she was chartered by the Australian Shipping Board. 11 December 1951 Empire Clarion was chartered by BHP Shipping Ltd. The charter lasted until 1955. On 20 July 1959, Cedarpool arrived at Hamburg, West Germany for scrapping.
