= Morania fire =

Fire on a freight barge which operated on the Great Lakes

Coordinates: 42°52′43″N 78°53′20″W

Morania #130 was a 4000-ton, 120-foot (37 m) freight barge which operated on the Great Lakes. On October 29, 1951, it was carrying 800,000 US gallons (3,000,000 L; 670,000 imp gal) of gasoline, when it was pushed by the diesel tug M/V Dauntless #12 into the path of the 454-foot (138-meter) steamer Penobscot – which was proceeding seaward empty after unloading grain at Buffalo, New York – on the Buffalo River. When the steamer backed away, a spark ignited the gasoline aboard the barge, resulting in a fire which killed 11 sailors, including two from Penobscot. The fire burned for several days as thousands of spectators watched.

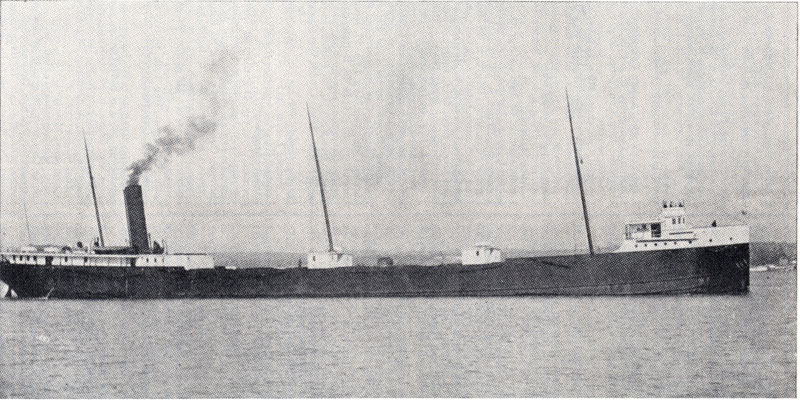
The steamer Penobscot.

It was the worst marine disaster in Buffalo in the 20th century.
