= SS Ingénieur Général Haarbleicher =

1944 UK cargo ship

History
- Name: Empire Call (1944–1945); Ingénieur Général Haarbleicher (1945)
- Owner: Ministry of War Transport (1944–1945); Ministère de la Marine Merchande (1945)
- Operator: Gibbs & Co Ltd (1944–1945); Compagnie Générale Transatlantique (1945)
- Port of registry: (United Kingdom) Greenock (1944–1945); (France) Marseille (1945)
- Builder: William Hamilton & Co Ltd
- Yard number: 462
- Launched: 10 February 1944
- Completed: July 1944
- Out of service: 21 November 1945
- Identification: United Kingdom Official Number 169509 (1944–1945); Code Letters GCWK (1944–1945); Code Letters FPPK (1945)
- Fate: Ran aground 1945, scrapped in situ 1947.

General characteristics
- Tonnage: 7,067 gross register tons (GRT); 4,759 NRT
- Length: 433 ft 5 in (132.11 m)
- Beam: 56 ft 2 in (17.12 m)
- Depth: 34 ft 2 in (10.41 m)
- Installed power: Triple expansion steam engine
- Propulsion: Screw propeller

Ingénieur Général Haarbleicher was a 7,067 GRT cargo ship which was built in 1944 for the Ministry of War Transport (MoWT) as Empire Call. In 1945 she was sold to the French government and renamed Ingénieur Général Haarbleicher. In November 1945, she ran aground on Stromboli and broke in two. Declared a total loss, she was scrapped in 1947.

== Description ==
The ship was built by William Hamilton & Co Ltd, Port Glasgow. Yard number 462, she was launched on 10 February 1944 and completed in July.

The ship was 433 feet 5 inches (132.11 m) long, with a beam of 56 feet 2 inches (17.12 m) and a depth of 34 feet 2 inches (10.41 m). She had a GRT of 7,067 and a NRT of 4,759. She was propelled by a triple expansion steam engine which had cylinders of 24 1/2 inches (62 cm), 39 inches (99 cm) and 70 inches (180 cm) diameter by 48 inches (120 cm) stroke. The engine was built by Harland & Wolff, Glasgow.

== History ==
=== Empire Call ===
Empire Call was built for the MoWT. She was operated under the management of Gibbs & Co Ltd. She was allocated the United Kingdom Official Number 169509 and used the Code Letters GCWK. Her port of registry was Greenock.

Empire Call was a member of a number of convoys during the Second World War.

SC 159

Convoy SC 159 departed Halifax, Nova Scotia on 18 October 1944 and arrived at Liverpool on 2 November. Empire Call was carrying a cargo of flour, destined for Cardiff.

ONS 97

Convoy ONS 97 departed Belfast Lough on 29 November 1944. Empire Call was bound for New York.

=== Ingénieur Général Haarbleicher ===
In 1945, Empire Call was sold to the French government, who renamed her Ingénieur Général Haarbleicher, after André Maurice Haarbleicher (1873-1944), murdered in Auschwitz, and placed her under the control of the Ministère de la Marine Marchande. She was operated under the management of Compagnie Générale Transatlantique. Her Code Letters were changed to FPPK and her port of registry to Marseille. The ship was named in honour of a French engineer who had been shot by the Germans during the Second World War.

On 18 November 1945, Ingénieur Général Haarbleicher departed Marseille bound for Saigon, French Indo-China. On 20 November. she ran aground on Stromboli, Italy in fog. The tug Hippopotame was despatched from Bizerte on 26 November, followed by the Camille Porch from Marseille on 28 November. Camille Porch was carrying divers and pumping equipment. On 3 December, work started to unload the ship's cargo into barges brought from Messina, but during the evening of 4 December a storm blew up. The ship was abandoned at 02:15 on 5 December and later broke in two. She was declared a total loss. Ingénieur Général Haarbleicher was scrapped in situ in 1947.
