= SS Ceuta (1929) =

1929 cargo ship

History
- Name: Ceuta (1929–45); Empire Camel (1945–46); Rinkenæs (1946–47); Oyrnafjall (1947–56); Safi (1956–60)
- Owner: Oldenburg-Portugiesische Dampfschiffs-Reederei (1929–45); Ministry of War Transport (1945–46); Danish Government (1946–47); Færøernes Lagting (1947–56); Oldenburg-Portuguese Line (1956–60)
- Operator: Oldenburg-Portugiesische Dampfschiffs-Reederei (1929–45); John Bruce & Co Ltd (1945–46); T C Christensen (1946–47); Færøernes Lagting (1947–56); Oldenburg-Portuguese Line (1956–60)
- Port of registry: (Weimar Republic) Oldenburg (1923–33); (Nazi Germany) Oldenburg (1933–45); (United Kingdom) London (1945–46); (Denmark) Copenhagen (1946–47); (Faroe Islands) Tórshavn (1947–56); (West Germany) Oldenburg (1956–60)
- Builder: Deutsche Werft
- Launched: 1929
- Completed: 1929
- Identification: Code Letters NHDL (1923–33); Code Letters DNAH (1935); Code Letters DNAX (1937–45); Code Letters GQXT (1945–46); Code Letters OXEF (1947–56); United Kingdom Official Number 180769 (1945–46)
- Fate: Scrapped 1960.

General characteristics
- Tonnage: 2,719 GRT; 1,603 NRT
- Length: 283 ft 3 in (86.33 m)
- Beam: 45 ft 9 in (13.94 m)
- Depth: 22 ft 9 in (6.93 m)
- Installed power: Compound steam engine
- Propulsion: Screw propeller
- Speed: 9.5 knots (17.6 km/h)

Ceuta was a 2,719 GRT cargo ship which was built in 1929 for the Oldenburg-Portugiesische Dampfschiffs-Reederei. She was sunk during an air raid in 1943, but later raised, repaired and returned to service. She was seized as a war prize in 1945, passed to the British Ministry of War Transport (MoWT) and renamed Empire Camel.

In 1946 she was passed to the Danish Government and renamed Rinkenæs. In 1947 she was sold to the Faroe Islands and renamed Oyrnafjall. In 1956 she was sold back to the Oldenburg-Portugiesische Dampfschiffs-Reederei and renamed Safi, serving until scrapped in January 1960.

== Description ==
The ship was built by Deutsche Werft, Hamburg. She was launched in 1929.

The ship was 283 feet 3 inches (86.33 m) long, with a beam of 45 feet 9 inches (13.94 m) and a depth of 22 feet 9 inches (6.93 m). Her GRT was 2,716 and she had a NRT of 1,603. She was propelled by a compound steam engine which had two cylinders of 18 11/16 inches (47.5 cm) and two cylinders of 39 3/8 inches (100 cm) diameter by 39 3/8 inches (100 cm) stroke. The engine developed 1,400 horsepower (1,000 kW).

== History ==
Ceuta was built for the Oldenburg-Portugiesische Dampfschiffs-Reederei, the company's third ship to carry that name. Her port of registry was Oldenburg and in 1930 her Code Letters were NHDL. In 1934, her Code Letters were changed to DNAH, these were changed to DNAX in 1937. On 29 December 1942, she collided with the German cargo ship Argonaut off Kirkenes, Norway. Argonaut sank. On 28 March 1943, Ceuta was sunk in an air raid at Rotterdam. She was later raised, repaired and returned to service. In May 1945, she was seized as a war prize at Kiel.

Ceuta was passed to the MoWT and renamed Empire Camel. She was placed under the management of John Bruce & Co Ltd. Her port of registry was changed to London and the Code Letters GQXT were allocated. She was passed to the Danish Government in 1946 and renamed Rinkenæs. She was operated under the management of T. C. Christensen, Copenhagen. In 1947, she was sold to Færøernes Lagting, Faroe Islands and renamed Oyrnafjall. Her port of registry was Tórshavn and her Code Letters were OXEF. serving with them until 1956, when she was sold to Oldenburg-Portugiesische Dampfschiffs-Reederei and renamed Safi. She was scrapped in Hamburg in January 1960.
