= SS Queenworth =

Cargo ship built 1943

History
- Name: Empire Citizen (1943-45); Queenworth (1945-60)
- Owner: Ministry of Transport (1943-45); Watergate Steamship Co Ltd (1945-60)
- Operator: Tanfield Steamship Co Ltd (1943-45); Dalgleish Ltd (1945-60)
- Port of registry: (United Kingdom) Grangemouth (1943-46); (United Kingdom) Newcastle upon Tyne (1946-60)
- Builder: Grangemouth Dockyard Co Ltd
- Launched: 1943
- Identification: Code Letters BFLK; United Kingdom Official Number 169099

General characteristics
- Class & type: Collier
- Tonnage: 2,066 GRT; 1,073 NRT
- Length: 272 ft 0 in (82.91 m)
- Beam: 40 ft 0 in (12.19 m)
- Depth: 17 ft 2 in (5.23 m)
- Installed power: Triple expansion steam engine
- Propulsion: Screw propeller

Queenworth was a 2,066 GRT collier which was built in 1943 as Empire Citizen by Grangemouth Dockyard Co Ltd, Grangemouth for the Ministry of War Transport (MoWT). In 1946 she was sold into merchant service and renamed Queenworth, serving until 1960 when she was scrapped.

== Description ==
The ship was built by Grangemouth Dockyard Co Ltd, Grangemouth. She was launched in 1943.

The ship was 272 feet 0 inches (82.91 m) long, with a beam of 40 feet 0 inches (12.19 m) and a depth of 17 feet 2 inches (5.23 m). She had a GRT of 2,066 and a NRT of 1,073.

The ship was propelled by a triple expansion steam engine, which had cylinders of 17 inches (43 cm), 27 inches (69 cm) and 48 inches (120 cm) diameter by 36 inches (91 cm) stroke.

== History ==
Empire Citizen was built for the MoWT. She was placed under the management of the Tanfield Steamship Co Ltd. Her port of registry was Grangemouth. The Code Letters BFLK and the United Kingdom Official Number 160699 were allocated.

In 1945, Empire Citizen was sold to the Watergate Steamship Co Ltd, Newcastle upon Tyne and was renamed Queenworth. She was operated under the management of Dalgliesh Ltd, Newcastle upon Tyne. Queenworth served until 1960 when she was scrapped at Dunston on Tyne.
