= SS Saltfleet =

Ship built in 1944

History
- Name: Empire Cheyne (1944-46); Saltfleet (1944-54)
- Owner: Ministry of War Transport (1944-45); Ministry of Transport (1945-46); Ouse Steamship Co Ltd (1946-54)
- Operator: E P Atkinson & Sons (1944-51)
- Port of registry: (United Kingdom) Aberdeen (1944-45); (United Kingdom) Goole (1945-54)
- Builder: John Lewis & Sons
- Yard number: 182
- Launched: 17 October 1944
- Completed: 26 December 1944
- Out of service: 1951-54
- Identification: Code Letters GDTW (1944-55); United Kingdom Official Number 180270
- Fate: Scrapped

General characteristics
- Tonnage: 1,051 GRT; 538 NRT
- Length: 205 ft 0 in (62.48 m)
- Beam: 32 ft 8 in (9.96 m)
- Depth: 13 ft 7 in (4.14 m)
- Installed power: Triple expansion steam engine
- Propulsion: Screw propeller

Saltfleet was a 1,051 GRT coaster which was built in 1944 by John Lewis & Sons Ltd, Aberdeen as Empire Cheyne. She was built for the Ministry of War Transport (MoWT). In 1946 she was sold and renamed Saltfleet. In October 1951, she ran aground at Reedness. Although salvage operations commenced in December 1951, they were abandoned in October 1952. Upon resumption of salvage in 1953, it was found that Saltfleet had broken her back, and the ship was scrapped in two parts, that of the bow section in May 1954 while the stern section was not scrapped until October 1954.

== Description ==
The ship was built by John Lewis & Sons Ltd, Aberdeen as yard number 182. She was launched on 17 October 1944 and completed on 26 December 1944.

The ship was 205 feet 0 inches (62.48 m) long, with a beam of 32 feet 8 inches (9.96 m) and a depth of 13 feet 7 inches (4.14 m). She had a GRT of 1,051 and a NRT of 538.

The ship was propelled by a triple expansion steam engine which had cylinders of 14 inches (36 cm) inches (57 cm), 24 inches (61 cm) and 40 inches (100 cm) diameter by 27 inches (69 cm) stroke.

== History ==
Empire Cheyne was built for the MoWT. She was placed under the management of E P Atkinson & Sons, Goole. The Code Letters GDTW and United Kingdom Official Number 165270 were allocated. Her port of registry was Aberdeen.

In 1946, Empire Cheyne was sold to the Ouse Steamship Co Ltd, Goole and was renamed Saltfleet. Her port of registry was changed to Goole. She remained under the management E P Atkinson & Sons Ltd. On 3 October 1951, Saltfleet ran aground at Reedness, East Riding of Yorkshire while on a voyage from Goole to Poole with a cargo of coal. She rolled over onto her side the next day. Salvage operations commenced in December 1951, but were abandoned in October 1952. When salvage operations recommenced in May 1953, it was discovered that Saltfleet had broken her back. In March 1954, the wreck was cut in half. On 28 May 1954, the bow section was raised and taken away to be scrapped. The stern section of Saltfleet was raised in September 1954 and floated up-river. It was scrapped in October 1954.
