= MV Empire Chancellor =

World War II merchant ship of the United Kingdom

History
- Name: Empire Chancellor (1945–46); Stanglen (1946–52); Newminster (1952–54); Stanpark (1954–59); Granny Suzanne (1959–60)
- Owner: Ministry of War Transport (1945–46); Stanhope Steamship Co Ltd (1946–52); Minster Steamship Co Ltd (1952–54); Stanhope Steamship Co Ltd (1954–59); Tsavliris Shipping Co (1959–60)
- Operator: Anglo-Saxon Petroleum Co Ltd (1945–46); Stanhope Steamship Co Ltd (1946–52); Minster Steamship Co Ltd (1952–54); Stanhope Steamship Co Ltd (1954–59); Tsavliris Shipping Co (1959–60)
- Port of registry: (United Kingdom) Sunderland (1945–52); (United Kingdom) London (1952–60)
- Builder: Sir J Laing & Sons Ltd
- Launched: 4 September 1944
- Completed: July 1945
- Identification: Code Letters GJWD; United Kingdom Official Number 180159
- Fate: Scrapped

General characteristics
- Class & type: Tanker
- Tonnage: 9,917 GRT; 5,922 NRT
- Length: 482 ft 7 in (147.09 m)
- Beam: 68 ft 3 in (20.80 m)
- Depth: 36 ft 1 in (11.00 m)
- Installed power: 2SCDA diesel engine
- Propulsion: Screw propeller

Empire Chancellor was a 9,917 GRT tanker which was built in 1945 by Sir J Laing & Sons Ltd, Sunderland for the Ministry of War Transport (MoWT). In 1946 she was sold into merchant service and renamed Stanglen. Further sales saw her renamed Newminster in 1952 and Stanpark in 1954. In 1959 she was sold and renamed Granny Suzanne. She was scrapped in 1960.

== Description ==
The ship was built by Sir J Laing & Sons Ltd, Sunderland. She was launched in 1945 and completed in July 1945.

The ship was 482 feet 7 inches (147.09 m) long, with a beam of 68 feet 3 inches (20.80 m) and a depth of 36 feet 1 inch (11.00 m). She had a GRT of 9,917 and a NRT of 5,922.

The ship was propelled by a 2-stroke Single Cycle Double Acting diesel engine, which had five cylinders of 27 9/16 inches (70.0 cm) diameter by 47 1/4 inches (120 cm) stroke. The engine was built by the North East Marine Engine Co (1938) Ltd, Newcastle upon Tyne. It developed 3,357 kilowatts (4,502 hp) at 105 rpm.

== History ==
Empire Coleridge was built for the MoWT. She was placed under the management of J A Billmeir & Co Ltd. Her port of registry was Sunderland. The Code Letters GJWD and United Kingdom Official Number 169020 were allocated.

In 1946, Empire Chancellor was sold to the Stanhope Steamship Co Ltd and renamed Stanglen. She remained under the management of J A Billmeir. In 1952, she was sold to the Minster Steamship Co Ltd and renamed Newminster. She was operated under the management of Mitchell, Coutts & Co. She was sold back to Stanhope Steamship Co Ltd in 1954 and renamed Stanpark. In 1957, the Arab League blacklisted Stanpark for "carrying strategic material" to Israel. In 1959 she was sold to Tsavliris Shipping Co, London, and renamed Granny Suzanne. The ship was scrapped in 1960 at Piraeus, Greece.
