= MV Willesden (1944) =

Cargo ship

History
- Name: Empire Canning (1944-46); Willesden (1946-58); Golden Lambda (1958-60); Marine Explorer (1960-62); East Vim (1962-63); Wasaka Bay (1963-66); Golden Wind (1966)
- Owner: Ministry of War Transport (1944-46); Britain Steamship Co Ltd (1946-58); World Wide Shipping Co Ltd (1958-60); Neptune Shipping Co Ltd (1960-62); Viking Shipping Co Ltd (1962-63); Marine Navigation Co Ltd (1963-66); Leo Shipping Co Ltd (1966)
- Operator: H Hogarth & Sons (1944-46); Watts, Watts & Co Ltd (1946-58); World Wide Shipping Co Ltd (1958-60); Neptune Shipping Co Ltd (1960-62); Viking Shipping Co Ltd (1962-63); Marine Navigation Co Ltd (1963-66); World Wide Shipping Co Ltd (1966)
- Port of registry: (United Kingdom) Dundee (1944-58); Hong Kong (1958-63); (United Kingdom) London (1963-66); Hong Kong (1966)
- Builder: Caledon Shipbuilding & Engineering Co Ltd,
- Yard number: 412
- Launched: 30 October 1944
- Completed: December 1944
- Identification: Code Letters GJVZ (1944-58); United Kingdom Official Number 166219 (1944-58, 1963-66)
- Fate: Scrapped 1966.

General characteristics
- Tonnage: 6,997 GRT; 3,852 NRT
- Length: 431 ft 3 in (131.45 m)
- Beam: 56 ft 3 in (17.15 m)
- Depth: 35 ft 2 in (10.72 m)
- Installed power: 1 x 4SCSA diesel engine
- Propulsion: Screw propeller

Willesden was a 6,997 GRT cargo ship which was built in 1944 for the Ministry of War Transport (MoWT) as Empire Canning. She was sold in 1946 and renamed Willesden. In 1958 she was sold to Hong Kong, serving various owners in the next five years under the names Golden Lambda, Marine Explorer and East Vim. In 1963, she was sold back to the United Kingdom and renamed Wakasa Bay. A further sale to Hong Kong in 1966 saw her renamed Golden Wind, serving until she was scrapped in December 1966.

== Description ==
The ship was built by Caledon Shipbuilding & Engineering Co Ltd, Dundee as yard number 412. She was launched on 30 October 1944 and completed in December 1944.

The ship was 431 feet 3 inches (131.45 m) long, with a beam of 56 feet 3 inches (17.15 m) and a depth of 35 feet 2 inches (10.72 m). Her GRT was 6,997 and she had a NRT of 3,852.

She was propelled by a 4-stroke, Single Cycle Single Action diesel engine which had eight cylinders of 25 5/16 in (65 cm) bore by 55 1/8 in (140 cm) stroke. The engine was built by Hawthorn, Leslie & Co Ltd, Newcastle upon Tyne.

== History ==
Empire Canning was built for the MoWT. She was placed under the management of H Hogarth & Sons Ltd. Her port of registry was Dundee. The Code Letters GVJZ were allocated. Her Official Number was 166219. In 1946, she was sold to the Britain Steamship Co Ltd and renamed Willesden. She was operated under the management of Watts, Watts & Co Ltd. In 1958, she was sold to World Wide Shipping Co Ltd, Hong Kong and renamed Golden Lambda. In 1960. she was sold to Neptune Shipping Co Ltd and renamed Marine Explorer. In 1962 she was sold to Viking Shipping Co Ltd and renamed East Vim. In 1963, she was sold to Marine Navigation Co Ltd, London and renamed Wakasa Bay. In 1966, she was sold to Leo Shipping Co Ltd, Hong Kong and renamed Golden Wind. She was placed under the management of World Wide Shipping Co Ltd. Golden Wind was scrapped in December 1966 at Hiroshima, Japan.
