= SS Clan Macalister =

SS Clan Macalister is the name of the following ships of the Clan Line named for Clan MacAlister:

- SS Clan Macalister (1891), sold in 1902 to Furness Withy and renamed Loyalist
- SS Clan Macalister (1903), sunk 6 November 1915 by SM U-35
- SS Clan Macalister (1930), sunk 29 May 1940
