= SS Clan Alpine =

Clan Alpine was the name of at least seven ships, five of which were managed by Clan Line.

- PS Clan Alpine (1862)
- SS Clan Alpine (1876)
- SS Clan Alpine (1878)
- SS Clan Alpine (1899)
- SS Clan Alpine (1918)
- SS Clan Alpine (1942)
- MV Clan Alpine (1967)
