= SS Clan Matheson =

Five Clan Line cargo ships have been named after Clan Matheson:

- SS Clan Matheson (1883), sold in 1905 and sunk in 1906.
- SS Clan Matheson (1905), captured and sunk in 1914.
- SS Clan Matheson (1917), sunk in a collision in 1918.
- SS Clan Matheson (1919), sold in 1948 and scuttled in 1955.
- MV Clan Matheson (1957), scrapped in 1978.
