= SS Clan Mackinnon =

Three steamships of the Clan Line were named Clan Mackinnon.

- SS Clan Mackinnon (1891), in service 1891–1902, sold to Furness, Withy & Co Ltd.
- SS Clan Mackinnon (1902), in service 1902–27, sold to Finland.
- SS Clan Mackinnon (1945), in service 1946–55, transferred to Houston Line.
