= SS Clan Macneil =

SS Clan Macneil is the name of the following ships of the Clan Line, named for Clan MacNeil:

- SS Clan Macneil (1903), torpedoed and sunk in the Mediterranean by SM UC-34 on 6 August 1918
- SS Clan Macneil (1921), scrapped in 1952
