= SS Clan Mackenzie =

Clan Mackenzie was the name of four steamships operated by Clan Line

- SS Clan Mackenzie (1882), sold in 1904
- SS Clan Mackenzie (1911), wrecked in 1912 at Cape Trafalgar
- SS Clan Mackenzie (1917), suffered a collision in 1937, a total loss
- SS Clan Mackenzie (1942), ex-Empire Cato, purchased in 1948 and scrapped in 1960
