= SS Clan Mackinlay =

Two ships of Clan Line were named Clan Mackinlay.

- SS Clan Mackinlay (1918), 6,418 GRT, bombed and sunk in 1940
- SS Clan Mackinlay (1945), 7,392 GRT, in service 1946–62
