= Harmodius =

Harmodius may refer to:

- Harmodius and Aristogeiton (died 514 BC), the killers of the Athenian tyrant Hipparchus
- Harmodius of Lepreon, ancient Greek writer
- SS Harmodius, one of several ships to bear the name.
