= SS Clan Colquhoun =

Two steamships of the Clan Line were named Clan Colquhoun:

- SS Clan Colquhoun (1899)
- SS Clan Colquhoun (1918)
