= Mesaba =

Mesaba or Mesabi may refer to:

- Mesabi Range of iron-rich mountains in Minnesota
- Mesabi Maiden, a thoroughbred racehorse
- Mesaba Railway in Minnesota
- Mesaba Co-op Park in Minnesota
- Mesaba Airlines, based in Minnesota

== Ships ==
- SS Mesaba (1898), a steamship built in 1898 and sunk in 1918
- SS Mesaba (1918), a steamship built as War Icarus in 1918, and named Mesaba from 1919 until 1925, and renamed Delphic in 1925
- Mesabi Miner, a motor ship built in 1977
