= Umvoti =

Umvoti may refer to:

- SS Clan Alpine (1942)
- Umvoti, KwaZulu-Natal, a town in KwaZulu-Natal, South Africa
- Umvoti River, a river in KwaZulu-Natal, South Africa
