= SS Umvoti =

A number of ships have been named Umvoti, including:

- SS Umvoti (1903), a British cargo ship in service 1925–40
- SS Umvoti (1942), a British cargo ship in service 1957–59
