= SS Delphic =

A number of ships have been named SS Delphic, including:

- SS Delphic (1897) – an ocean liner launched in 1897 and sunk in 1917
- SS Delphic (1925) – a cargo ship launched in 1918 as War Icarus, renamed Mesaba in 1919, Delphic in 1925 and Clan Farquhar in 1933. She was broken up in 1948
