= SS Clan Macalister (1930) =

Coordinates: 51°04′41″N 02°28′00″E

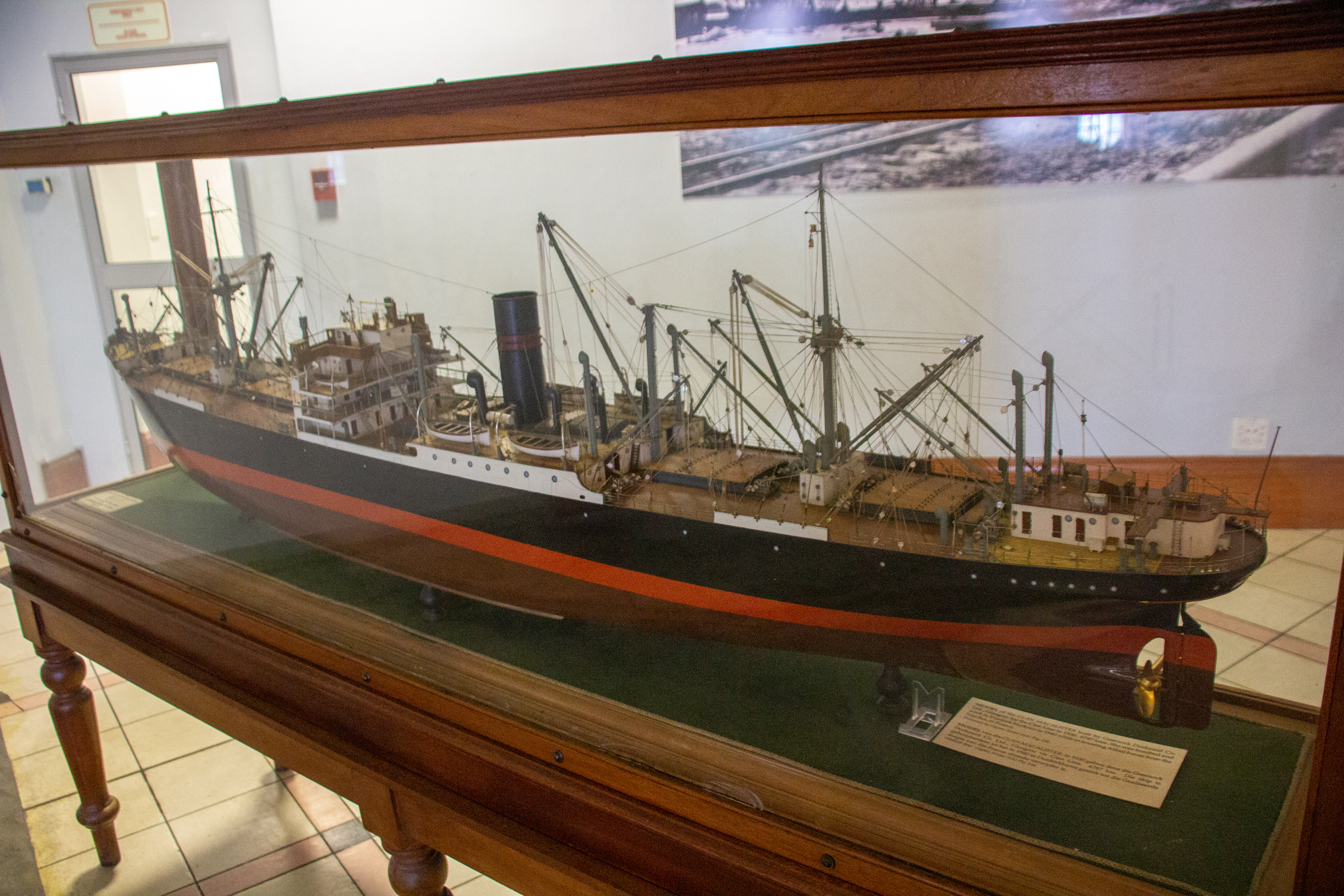
- Model of the ship at the South African Maritime Museum

History

United Kingdom
- Name: Clan Macalister
- Namesake: Clan MacAlister
- Owner: Clan Line Steamers Ltd
- Operator: Cayzer, Irvine & Co Ltd
- Port of registry: Glasgow
- Builder: Greenock Dockyard Company
- Yard number: 418
- Launched: 29 January 1930
- Completed: April 1930
- Acquired: 8 May 1930
- Identification: UK official number 161909; code letters LFVP (until 1933); call sign GQYP (1934 onward)
- Fate: Sunk by air attack, 29 May 1940

General characteristics
- Type: heavy-lift ship
- Tonnage: as built: 6,795 GRT; 4,097 NRT; 1934 onward: 6,787 GRT; 4,081 NRT
- Length: 453.8 ft (138.3 m)
- Beam: 62.3 ft (19.0 m)
- Depth: 28.9 ft (8.8 m)
- Decks: 2
- Installed power: 719 NHP; 5,150 IHP
- Propulsion: triple-expansion engine, exhaust steam turbine
- Speed: 13 knots (24 km/h)
- Crew: 75 + 4 DEMS gunners
- Sensors & processing systems: wireless direction finding; echo sounding device (by 1934); gyrocompass (by 1934)
- Notes: sister ships: Clan Macdonald, Clan Macdougall, Clan Macpherson

SS Clan Macalister was a Clan Line heavy-lift cargo liner. She was launched in 1930 in Scotland and sunk by enemy aircraft during the Dunkirk evacuation in 1940 with the loss of 18 of her crew. She was the largest ship to take part in the Dunkirk evacuation.

She was the third Clan Line ship to be called Clan Macalister. The first was a steamship built in 1891 and sold to Furness, Withy in 1902. The second was a steamship built in 1903 and sunk by a U-boat in 1915.

== Details ==
Clan Macalister was a sister ship of Clan Macdonald, which was launched in 1928, and Clan Macdougall and Clan Macpherson, which were launched in 1929. Clan Line had all four ships built by the Greenock Dockyard Company, which it owned.

Clan Macalister was launched on 29 January 1930 and completing her that April. She was 453.8 ft (138.3 m) long, had a beam of 62.3 ft (19.0 m), and as built her tonnages were 6,795 GRT and 4,097 NRT.

Whereas Clan Macdonald and Clan Macdougall were motor ships, for Clan Macpherson and Clan Macalister Clan Line reverted to a triple-expansion engine linked to a Bauer-Wach low-pressure exhaust steam turbine. The turbine drove the same shaft as her piston engine by double-reduction gearing and a Föttinger fluid coupling. The combined power of her piston engine and turbine was 719 NHP.

John G. Kincaid & Company of Greenock built Clan Macalister's triple-expansion engine. William Beardmore and Company of Glasgow made her Bauer-Wach turbine. On 8 May 1930 she passed her sea trials. On her speed trial she achieved 16.5 knots (30.6 km/h). She was handed over to her owners the same day.

At least one of Clan Macalister's derricks could lift 50 tons.

Clan Macalister's UK official number was 161909. Her code letters were LFVP until 1933–34, when they were superseded by the call sign GQYP.

== Loss ==
The UK Government requisitioned Clan Macalister on 28 September 1939.

On 27 May 1940 Clan Macalister was in Southampton when the Admiralty requisitioned her to assist the evacuation of UK and Allied forces from Dunkirk. With her heavy-lift derricks she loaded eight landing craft and sailed for Dunkirk.

On the morning of 29 May Clan Macalister anchored about 1 1/2 nautical miles (2.8 km) off Dunkirk and with her derricks unloaded her landing craft. Two were damaged while being unloaded, but the other six began evacuating troops.

At 1545 hrs three bombs dropped by German aircraft hit the ship, and a fire broke out in her number 5 hold. The destroyer HMS Malcolm rescued her troops and wounded members of Clan Macalister's crew, and tried to fight the fire. The minesweeper HMS Pangbourne rescued the remainder of Clan Macalister's crew, including her Master, RW Mackie.

18 of Clan Macalister's crew were killed.

== Bibliography ==
- Clarkson, John; Fenton, Roy; Munro, Archie (2007). Clan Line Illustrated Fleet History. Preston: Ships in Focus. ISBN 978-1-901703-47-4.
