= SS Harmodius =

List of ships with the same or similar names.

Harmodius was the name of three ships operated by the Houston Line

- SS Harmodius (1892), purchased in 1900, sold in 1919.
- SS Harmodius (Ayrshire, 1919), torpedoed and sunk in 1941
- SS Harmodius (Hamilton, 1919), purchased in 1948, sold in 1951
