= SS Clan Macfadyen (1923) =

Coordinates: 8°57′N 59°48′W

History

United Kingdom
- Name: Clan Macfadyen
- Owner: Clan Line Steamers Ltd
- Operator: Cayzer, Irvine & Co Ltd
- Port of registry: Glasgow
- Builder: Ayrshire Dockyard Co Ltd, Irvine
- Yard number: 490
- Launched: 15 February 1923
- Completed: May 1923
- Identification: UK official number 146335; code letters KNWL (until 1933); call sign GDKZ (1934 onward)
- Fate: Torpedoed 27 November 1942

General characteristics
- Class & type: Clan Macnab-class cargo liner
- Tonnage: as built: 6,224 GRT; 3,864 NRT; 1931 onward: 6,191 GRT; 3,779 NRT
- Length: 418.2 ft (127.5 m)
- Beam: 53.4 ft (16.3 m)
- Draught: 27 ft 9 in (8.46 m)
- Depth: 33.6 ft (10.2 m)
- Installed power: 630 NHP (as built); 743 NHP (after 1928)
- Propulsion: Built with triple-expansion engine.; Exhaust steam turbine added 1928.
- Speed: 13 knots (24 km/h)
- Crew: 84 plus eight DEMS gunners
- Sensors & processing systems: wireless direction finding (by 1930); echo sounding device (by 1936)
- Armament: (as DEMS): 1 × 4-inch gun; 1 × QF 12-pounder gun; 6 × machine guns
- Notes: sister ships: Clan Macnab, Clan Macnair, Clan Macnaughton, Clan Macneil, Clan Macfarlane

SS Clan Macfadyen was a UK steam cargo liner. She was launched in 1923 and spent her entire career with Clan Line. A U-boat sank her in 1942 with the loss of 82 lives.

She was the second of three Clan Lines ship to be called Clan Macfadyen. The first was a steamship that was built in 1899 and sold in 1921. The third was a ship bought from the Ministry of Transport in 1947 and sold in 1958.

== Details ==
The Ayrshire Dockyard Co Ltd of Irvine, Ayrshire, built a class of six sister ships for Clan Line. Clan Macnab was launched in 1921 and gave her name to the class. Clan Macnair, Clan Macnaughton and Clan Macneil were launched in 1921, and ClanMacfarlane was launched in 1922.

Clan Macfadyen was the final member of the class to be built. She was launched on 15 February 1923 and completed that May. She was 418.2 ft (127.5 m) long, had a beam of 53.4 ft (16.3 m) and draught of 27 ft 9 in (8.46 m). Until 1931 her tonnages were 6,224 GRT and 3,864 NRT.

Clan Macfadyen was built with a triple-expansion engine made by Dunsmuir and Jackson of Govan that developed 630 NHP. In 1928 she was sent to Deutsche Schiff- und Maschinenbau in Germany to be the first Clan Line ship to be fitted with a Bauer-Wach exhaust steam turbine. This increased her total power to 743 NHP and increased her speed, but a problem with her condenser prevented it from improving her fuel economy as it was designed to do. Despite this setback, and the £10,000 cost of the installation, Clan Line decided to have Bauer-Wach turbines installed in numerous existing ships in the fleet, and to specify them for new steamships with reciprocating engines.

In 1931 Clan Macfadyen's tonnages were revised to 6,191 GRT and 3,779 NRT. By 1936 Clan Macfadyen had been fitted with an echo sounding device.

Clan Macfadyen's UK official number was 146317. Her code letters were KNWL until 1933–34, when they were superseded by the call sign GDKZ.

In the Second World War Clan Macfadyen was defensively armed with a 4-inch naval gun on her stern, plus a quick-firing 12-pounder gun and four machine guns for anti-aircraft cover.

On 7 February 1940 the UK Government requisitioned Clan Macfadyen.

== Loss ==
On 17 November 1942 Clan Macfadyen left Pernambuco in Brazil, sailing to Trinidad with a cargo of rum, mail, 5 tons of hemp and 6,705 tons of sugar. She was unescorted and steering a zigzag course. At 1324 hrs on 26 November U-508 fired two torpedoes at her but both missed. Clan Macfayden's crew did not notice the attack, and about 2300 hrs she stopped zigzagging.

At 0002 hrs on 27 November the ship was near the Orinoco Delta on the coast of Venezuela, about 95 miles southeast of Trinidad, when U-508 attacked again. Two torpedoes hit Clan Macfadyen on her starboard side, breaking her in two. Her forepart capsized and sank, her after part sank on an even keel, and both had sunk within four minutes.

The crew had no time to launch any of her four lifeboats. Nine crewmen and one DEMS gunner managed to climb aboard two liferafts that floated clear of the wreck. On 31 November the schooner Harvard rescued three crewmen and a gunner from one liferaft and took them to Trinidad. On 1 December six men reached Trinidad on the other liferaft.

The Master, Percy Williams, 11 Merchant Navy officers, 63 lascar crewmen, seven DEMS gunners and a 17-year-old Merchant Navy apprentice were killed.

== Bibliography ==
- Clarkson, John; Fenton, Roy; Munro, Archie (2007). Clan Line Illustrated Fleet History. Preston: Ships in Focus. ISBN 978-1-901703-47-4.
