= SS Clan Alpine (1899) =

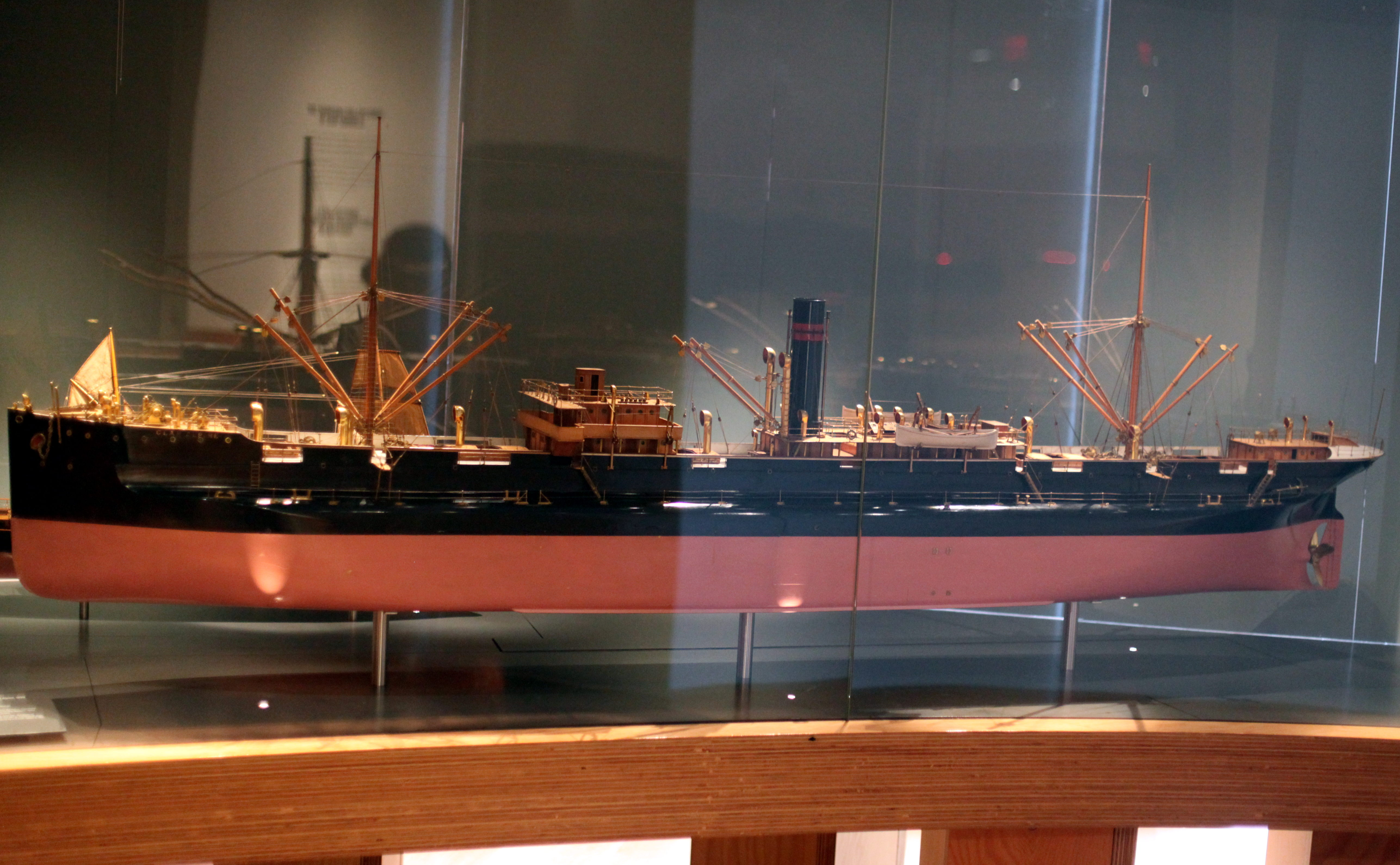
- Scale model of Clan Alpine

History

United Kingdom
- Name: Clan Alpine
- Owner: Clan Line Steamers Ltd
- Operator: Cayzer, Irvine & Co Ltd
- Port of registry: Glasgow
- Builder: William Doxford & Sons, Pallion
- Yard number: 273
- Launched: 22 September 1899
- Sponsored by: Miss Greta Doxford
- Completed: November 1899
- Identification: UK official number 111232; code letters RKFT
- Fate: Sunk, 10 June 1917

General characteristics
- Type: turret deck ship
- Tonnage: 3,587 GRT; 2,285 NRT; 5,450 DWT
- Length: 355.0 ft (108.2 m)
- Beam: 45.6 ft (13.9 m)
- Depth: 24.7 ft (7.5 m)
- Installed power: William Doxford & Sons 3-cylinder triple expansion engine, 330 NHP
- Propulsion: single screw
- Speed: 12 knots (22 km/h)

Clan Alpine was a turret deck ship, built in 1899 by the William Doxford & Sons of Pallion. She was the second of Clan Line ship named Clan Alpine, and worked their Oriental routes.

== Design and construction ==
In 1899 Clan Line sold their old steamer Clan Alpine, and placed an order with William Doxford & Sons of Pallion to build three turret deck ships for them (the future Clan Alpine, Clan Farquhar and Clan Urquhart). The ship was launched on 22 September 1899 (25 September 1899 according to other source), with Miss Greta Doxford, daughter of William Theodore Doxford, being the sponsor. The ship was completed that November. She was 355.0 ft (108.2 m) long (between perpendiculars) and 45.6 ft (13.9 m) abeam, a depth of 24.7 feet (7.5 m). Her tonnages were 3,587 GRT and 2,285 NRT. She had a steel hull, and a single triple-expansion steam engine, with cylinders of 25 1/2-inch (65 cm), 42-inch (110 cm), and 69-inch (180 cm) diameter with a 48-inch (120 cm) stroke. It was rated at 330 nhp; drove a single screw propeller; and gave her a speed of 12 knots (14 mph; 22 km/h).

== Operational history ==
In the early 1900s, the Clan Line operated two main routes between United Kingdom and her colonies in the East. One was a direct route from the home ports through the Strait of Gibraltar, Suez Canal and to the ports of India and Ceylon. The other involved sailing down the western coast of Africa first to the ports of South African colonies; then onto the ports of Ceylon and India; and occasional trips to Australia.

Upon delivery, Clan Alpine went to Middlesbrough, and thence to Glasgow for loading, where she arrived on 18 November 1899. From there, she sailed to Liverpool and Manchester to load more cargo. She left Manchester for Bombay for her maiden voyage on 12 December 1899, passing through Suez Canal on 30 December, and arrived in Bombay on 13 January 1900. After calling at several Indian ports, she left for Britain, passed through Suez Canal on 13 February, and reached Dunkirk on 3 March. After unloading, she continued to Britain, and arrived at Greenock on 15 March. After a brief stop, she left Greenock on 22 March 1900, loaded cargo at Liverpool, and left there for Cape Town on 29 March. After calling at various South African ports, she sailed to Ceylon via Mauritius, and arrived at Galle on 3 July. From Galle she continued to India, including Madras, where she arrived on 28 July. From India, Clan Alpine left for Britain via Colombo, and arrived in London on 8 September 1900, before continuing to Glasgow which she reached on 22 September. She soon left for another trip, leaving from Liverpool for Calcutta on 6 October 1900.

Clan Alpine continued service on both routes through the rest of her career.

On 22 November 1908, Clan Alpine left Liverpool for South Africa. On 11 December 1908 it was announced that Clan Alpine was chartered to take wheat from South Australia to England and Europe. She reached Cape Town on 19 December 1908 from Liverpool; left there on 23 December; called at Mossel Bay and Port Elizabeth; and reached East London on 31 December 1908. She left East London on 2 January 1909, reached Adelaide on 23 January 1909, and continued to Geelong where she arrived three days later.

=== Loss ===
On 10 June 1917, U-60 sank Clan Alpine by torpedo, 40 nautical miles (74 km) off Muckle Flugga, Shetland Islands on a passage from Tyne to Archangel, killing eight members of her crew.
