= SS Clan Mackenzie (1942) =

Cargo ship

History
- Name: Empire Cato (1942-48); Clan Mackenzie (1948-60)
- Owner: Ministry of War Transport (1942-48); Clan Line Steamers Ltd (1948-60)
- Operator: Hain Steamship Co Ltd (1942-48); Clan Line Steamers Ltd (1948-60)
- Port of registry: (United Kingdom) West Hartlepool (1942-48); (United Kingdom) Glasgow (1948-60)
- Builder: William Gray & Co. Ltd.
- Launched: 10 November 1942
- Completed: December 1942
- Identification: Code Letters BFLC; UK Official Number 168949
- Fate: Scrapped 1960.

General characteristics
- Tonnage: 7,039 GRT; 4,851 NRT
- Length: 431 ft 5 in (131.50 m)
- Beam: 56 ft 2 in (17.12 m)
- Depth: 35 ft 2 in (10.72 m)
- Installed power: Triple expansion steam engine
- Propulsion: Screw propeller

Clan Mackenzie was a 7,039 GRT cargo ship which was built in 1942 for the Ministry of War Transport (MoWT) as Empire Cato. In 1948 she was sold to Clan Line and renamed Clan Mackenzie, serving until 1960 when she was scrapped.

== Description ==
The ship was built by William Gray & Co. Ltd., West Hartlepool. She was launched on 10 November 1942 and completed in December.

The ship was 431 feet 5 inches (131.50 m) long, with a beam of 56 feet 2 inches (17.12 m) and a depth of 35 feet 2 inches (10.72 m). She had a GRT of 7,039 and a NRT of 4,851.

She was propelled by a triple expansion steam engine which had cylinders of 24 1/2 inches (62 cm), 30 inches (76 cm) and 70 inches (180 cm) diameter by 48 inches (120 cm) stroke. The engine was built by the Central Marine Engine Works, West Hartlepool.

== History ==
Empire Castle was built for the MoWT. She was placed under the management of the Hain Steamship Co Ltd. She was allocated the United Kingdom Official Number 168949. The Code Letters BFLC were allocated and her port of registry was West Hartlepool.

Empire Cato was a member of a number of convoys during the Second World War.

ON 169

Convoy ON 169 departed Liverpool on 22 February 1943 and arrived at New York on 21 March. Empire Cato was in ballast.

KMS 58G

Convoy KMS 58G detached from Convoy OS 84 on 1 August 1944. Convoy OS 84 had departed from Liverpool on 21 July and arrived at Freetown, Sierra Leone on 10 August. Empire Cato was towing LCT 1319 and LCT 7020, bound for Augusta, Italy.

KMS 90

Convoy KMS 90 detached from Convoy OS 116. Convoy OS 116 had departed from Liverpool on 13 March 1945. Convoy KMS 90 arrived at Gibraltar on 21 March.

In 1948, Empire Cato was sold to Clan Line Steamers Ltd and renamed Clan Mackenzie. She was the fourth Clan Line ship to bear that name. Clan Mackenzie served until 1960. She arrived at Hong Kong on 14 October 1960 for scrapping.
