= Harmodius of Lepreon =

Ancient Greek writer

Harmodius (Ancient Greek: Ἁρμόδιος) of Lepreon was an ancient Greek writer, whose time is unknown. His work is repeatedly quoted by Athenaeus.
