= SS Gallic (1918) =

British-built cargo steamship

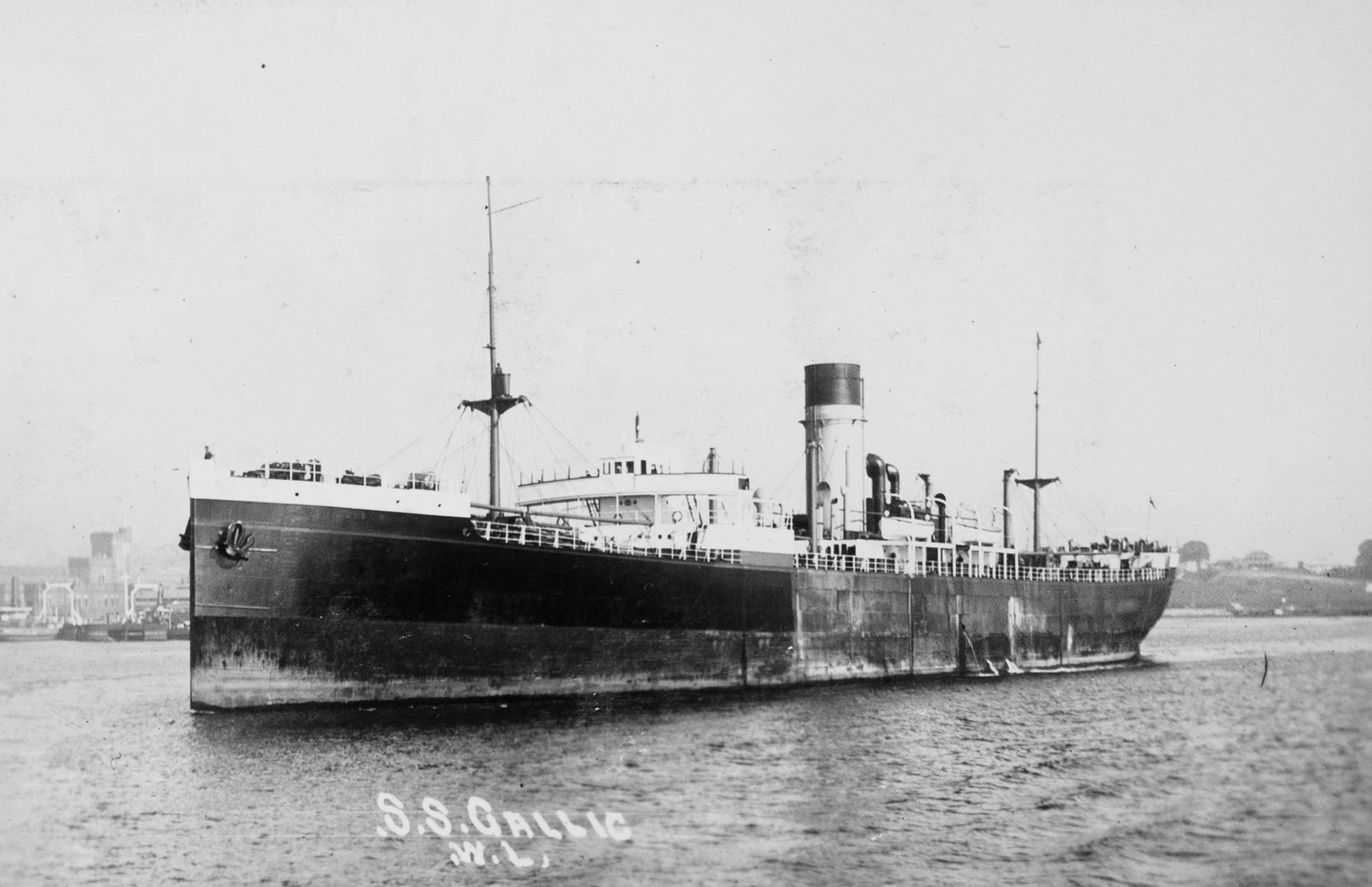
- SS Gallic

History

United Kingdom
- Name: War Argus (October 1918 – August 1919); Gallic (August 1919 – October 1933)
- Owner: Shipping Controller (October 1918 – August 1919); White Star Line (August 1919 – October 1933)
- Operator: White Star Line
- Port of registry: Liverpool
- Route: Australian service
- Builder: Workman, Clark & Co. Ltd., Belfast
- Yard number: 436
- Launched: 19 October 1918
- Completed: 12 December 1918
- In service: August 1919
- Identification: UK official number 142741; code letters JVRD; from 1930: call sign GPYV
- Fate: Sold to Clan Line in October 1933

United Kingdom
- Name: Clan Colquhoun
- Owner: Clan Line
- Operator: Clan Line (1933–1941, 1946–1947); Ministry of War Transport (1941–1946)
- Port of registry: Glasgow
- Route: Atlantic cargo service
- Acquired: October 1933
- In service: October 1933
- Out of service: February 1947
- Fate: Sold to the Zarati Steamship Co. of Panama

Panama
- Name: Ioannis Livanos
- Owner: Zarati Steamship Co.
- Port of registry: Panama
- Acquired: February 1947
- Out of service: 1949
- Fate: Sold to Dos Oceanos Cia de Nav SA in 1949

Panama
- Name: Jenny
- Owner: Dos Oceanos Cia de Nav SA)
- Port of registry: Panama
- Acquired: 1949
- Out of service: 1951
- Fate: Sold to PT Djakarta Lloyd of Indonesia in 1951

Indonesia
- Name: Imam Bondjal (1951–1952); Djatinegara (1952–1955)
- Owner: PT Djakarta Lloyd
- Port of registry: Djakarta
- Acquired: 1951
- Out of service: 1955
- Fate: Sold to Japanese breakers in 1955; scrapped at Hong Kong in 1956

General characteristics
- Class & type: War Standard Type "G"
- Tonnage: 7,912 GRT, 4,888 NRT
- Length: 450.0 ft (137.2 m) registered
- Beam: 58.5 ft (17.8 m)
- Depth: 32.8 ft (10.0 m)
- Decks: 3
- Installed power: 438 NHP or 5,800 ihp
- Propulsion: 2 × triple-expansion steam engines; 2 × screws
- Speed: 12.5 kn (23 km/h; 14 mph)

SS Gallic was a cargo-passenger steamship built in 1918. During her career, she had six different owners and sailed under the flags of the United Kingdom, Panama and Indonesia. She underwent seven name changes during her 37-year career. She was scrapped at Hong Kong in 1956, the last surviving White Star Line cargo ship.

== Career ==
In the latter part of the First World War the UK Shipping Controller ordered a large number of merchant ships, built to a set of standard designs, to replace losses due to German's resumption of unrestricted submarine warfare. One of these was War Argus; one of 22 Standard Type "G" ships. She was built by Workman, Clark & Co. of Belfast, who launched her on 19 October and completed her on 12 December, a month after the Armistice. She was operated by the White Star Line for the government until she was officially declared surplus in 1919. In August 1919, War Argus was purchased by White Star and renamed Gallic.

Gallic then served on the Australian service, and was later switched to Atlantic cargo service. As a result of the Depression and the merger of White Star with the Cunard Line, in October 1933 Gallic was sold to the Clan Line and renamed Clan Colquhoun. She continued her service on the same Atlantic route for the next 14 years. During the Second World War, she was operated by the Ministry of War Transport as a refrigerated cargo carrier; unlike many other cargo steamers, she survived the war without incident.

In February 1947, Clan Colquhoun was sold to the Zarati Steamship Co. of Panama and renamed Ioannis Livanos. However, her new owners sold her in 1949 to another Panamanian shipping company, the Two Oceans Navigation Company SA (Dos Oceanos Compania de Navegacion SA), which renamed her Jenny. In 1951, she was sold to PT Djakarta Lloyd of Indonesia, which renamed her Imam Bondjal, but changed this to Djatinegara in 1952. In 1955, after 37 years of service, she was sold to Japanese breakers for scrapping. While under tow from Djakarta to Osaka, on 1 December 1955 Djatinegara was forced to put in at Lingayen in the Philippines with her engine room flooded. She was refloated on 21 February 1956 and was scrapped at Hong Kong shortly after.
