= SS Clan Mackinlay (1945) =

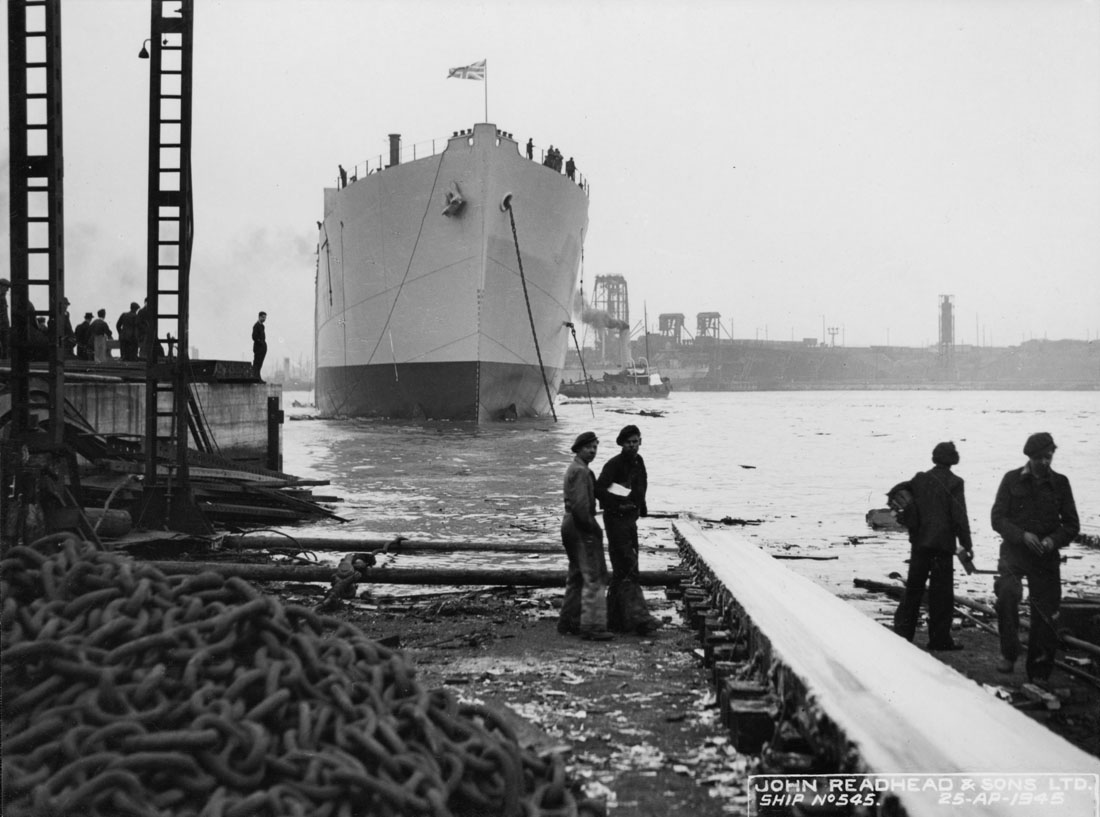
- The ship as the Empire Fawley being launched in South Shields in 1945

History
- Name: Empire Fawley (1945–46); Clan Mackinlay (1947–62)
- Owner: Ministry of War Transport (1945); Ministry of Transport (1945–46); Clan Line (1946-62)
- Operator: J A Billmeier & Co Ltd (1945–46); Cayzer, Irvine & Co Ltd (1946-62)
- Port of registry: South Shields, United Kingdom (1945–46); (United Kingdom) Newcastle upon Tyne (1946–62)
- Builder: John Readhead & Sons Ltd
- Yard number: 545
- Launched: 25 April 1945
- Completed: May 1945
- Identification: United Kingdom Official Number 180221; Code Letters GJTC
- Fate: Scrapped

General characteristics
- Type: Cargo ship
- Tonnage: 7,392 GRT; 5,273 NRT; 10,120 DWT
- Length: 431 feet 2 inches (131.42 m)
- Beam: 56 ft 3 in (17.15 m)
- Depth: 35 ft 6 in (10.82 m)
- Propulsion: Triple expansion steam engine, single screw propeller
- Speed: 11 knots (20 km/h)

Clan Mackinlay was a 7,392 GRT cargo ship that was built as Empire Fawley in 1945 by John Readhead & Sons Ltd, South Shields for the Ministry of War Transport (MoWT). She was sold in 1946 and renamed Clan Mackinlay. She was in service until 1962 when she was scrapped.

== Description ==
The ship was a cargo ship built in 1945 by John Readhead & Sons Ltd, South Shields, United Kingdom. She was yard number 545.

The ship was 431 feet 2 inches (131.42 m) long, with a beam of 56 feet 3 inches (17.15 m). She had a depth of 35 feet 2 inches (10.72 m). She was assessed at 7,392 GRT, 5,273 NRT, 10,120 DWT.

The ship was propelled by a triple expansion steam engine, which had cylinders of 24.5 inches (62 cm), 39 inches (99 cm) and 70 inches (180 cm) diameter by 48 inches (120 cm) stroke. The engine was built by Vickers Armstrongs Ltd, Barrow-in-Furness, Lancashire. It drove a single screw propeller. The engine could propel the ship at a speed of 11 knots (20 km/h).

== History ==
The ship was built by John Readhead & Sons Ltd, South Shields, United Kingdom. She was launched on 25 April 1945 and completed in May. Built for the MOWT, she was placed under the management of J A Billmeir & Co Ltd. The United Kingdom Official Number 180221 and Code Letters GJTC were allocated. Her port of registry was South Shields.

Empire Fawley was sold in 1946 to Clan Line Ltd and was renamed Clan Mackinlay. She was operated under the management of Cayzer, Irvine & Co Ltd. Her port of registry was Newcastle upon Tyne. In January 1959, Cayzer, Irvine & Co Ltd were prosecuted at Grays Thurrock, Essex over alleged emissions of smoke from Clan Mackinlay at Tilbury, Essex on 2 October 1958, in breach of the Clean Air Act 1956. The company was fined £25, with 10 guineas costs. The cause was stated to be a fault developing in a boiler necessitating another to be fired up at short notice, the fuel not burning efficiently as the oil was cold. She arrived at Hong Kong on 2 November 1962 for scrapping, which was done by the Peninsular Shipbreaking Co.
