= List of shipwrecks in 1882 =

The list of shipwrecks in 1882 includes ships sunk, foundered, grounded, or otherwise lost during 1882.

table of contents
← 1881 / 1882 / 1883 →
| Jan | Feb | Mar | Apr |
| May | Jun | Jul | Aug |
| Sep | Oct | Nov | Dec |
Unknown date

== Unknown date ==
List of shipwrecks: Unknown date in 1882
| Ship | State | Description |
|---|---|---|
| Bahama | Flag unknown | The vessel sank. A Trinidad brigantine picked up the only survivor from an icebox; he was in the sea for six days. |
| Boyne | United Kingdom | The barque was driven ashore near False Point, India. All on board survived. She was on a voyage from Suva, Fiji to Calcutta, India. |
| Bulwark | United States | The barque foundered in the Pacific Ocean with the loss of eighteen of her crew. She was on a voyage from Yokohama, Japan to the Puget Sound. |
| Don Guillermo | Flag unknown | The barque sank in the harbour of Vanvan, Tonga during a hurricane, when a 15-foot (4.6 m) storm surge swept over the island. The captain, officers, and six seamen were drowned. Five boys survived. |
| General Miller | United States | The schooner was wrecked in the Shumagin Islands in the Department of Alaska. |
| Gitana | United Kingdom | The steam yacht foundered in Loch Rannoch. |
| H. L. Tiernan | United States | The two-masted cod-fishing schooner was lost in the Shumagin Islands. |
| Malleville | United States | The barque was wrecked with the loss of all hands. She was on a voyage from China to Victoria. |
| Mayumba | United Kingdom | The cargo ship caught fire at "Arzue", Algeria, and was scuttled. She was declared a total loss. |
| Meandre | France | The steamship ran aground near Panomi, Greece between 30 March and 5 April. She was refloated. |
| Nile | United Kingdom | The full-rigged ship was abandoned at sea between 7 January and 14 March. She was on a voyage from London to New York, United States. |
| Pactolus | Canada | The barque was wrecked on the Isla de los Estados, Argentina after 10 January. She was on a voyage from Liverpool, Lancashire, United Kingdom to Valparaíso, Chile. |
| Roslyn | United States | The steam launch sprang a leak and sank 12 nautical miles (22 km) east of Faulkner's Island, Connecticut. The wreck was located in 1915 or 1916. |
| Santa Catharina | (Empire of Brazil) Brazilian Navy | While docked for repairs, the Pará-class river monitor sank at her moorings due to the poor condition of her hull. |
| Seafield | United Kingdom | The ship was wrecked at East London, Cape Colony after 15 April. |
