= SS Clan Mackinnon (1945) =

Cargo ship built in County Durham, England

History
- Name: Empire Dunnet (1945–46); Clan Mackinnon (1946–61); Ardross (1961–63); Labuan Bay (1963–67)
- Owner: Ministry of War Transport (1945); Ministry of Transport (1945–46); Clan Line Steamers Ltd (1946–55); Houston Line (1955–61); Mullion & Co Ltd (1961–63); Kinabatangan Shipping SA (1963–67)
- Operator: Common Bros Ltd (1945–46); Clan Line Steamers Ltd (1946–55); Houston Line (1955–61); Mullion & Co Ltd (1961–63); United China Shipping Co Ltd (1963–67)
- Port of registry: United Kingdom (1946–61); Hong Kong (1961–63); Panama City, Panama (1963–67)
- Builder: William Gray & Co Ltd
- Yard number: 1177
- Launched: 10 July 1945
- Completed: September 1945
- Out of service: 20 March 1967
- Identification: United Kingdom Official Number 180086 (1945–61); IMO number: 1180086 ( –1967)
- Fate: Wrecked

General characteristics
- Type: Cargo ship
- Tonnage: 7,373 GRT; 4,611 NRT; 10,100 DWT
- Length: 431 ft (131 m)
- Beam: 56 ft (17 m)
- Propulsion: Triple expansion steam engine

Location where Labuan Bay was wrecked off the coast of Malaysia.

The Clan Mackinnon was a 7,373 GRT cargo ship that was built in 1945 as Empire Dunnet by William Gray & Co Ltd, West Hartlepool, County Durham, England for the Ministry of War Transport. She was sold into merchant service in 1946 and renamed Clan Mackinnon. In 1961 she was sold to a Hong Kong company and renamed Ardross. A sale to a Panamanian owner in 1963 saw her renamed Labuan Bay. She served until 1967, when she was wrecked off Borneo.

== Description ==
The ship was built in 1945 by William Gray & Co Ltd, West Hartlepool, Co Durham. She was yard number 1177.

The ship was 431 feet (131 m) long, with a beam of 56 feet (17 m). She was assessed at 7,373 GRT, 4,611 NRT. Her DWT was 10,100.

The ship was propelled by a triple expansion steam engine.

== History ==
Empire Dunnet was launched on 10 July 1945 and completed in September. The United Kingdom Official Number 180086 was allocated. She was placed under the management of Common Bros Ltd, Newcastle upon Tyne.

In 1946, Empire Dunnet was sold to Clan Line Steamers Ltd and was renamed Clan Mackinnon, the third Clan Line ship to bear this name. In 1955, Clan Line was transferred to the Houston Line. In 1961, Clan Mackinnon was sold to Mullion & Co Ltd, Hong Kong, and was renamed Ardross. In 1963, she was sold to Kinabatangan Shipping SA, of Panama, and was renamed Labuan Bay.

On 20 March 1967, Labuan Bay ran aground at Bancoran Island, Borneo (7°58′N 118°04′E) and caught fire. She was refloated four days later and towed to Manila, Philippines. On 11 July, a further fire occurred. Labuan Bay was scrapped in November 1967 at Kaohsiung, Taiwan.
