= SS Clan Matheson (1905) =

UK cargo steamship sunk in WW1

History

United Kingdom
- Name: Clan Matheson
- Namesake: Clan Matheson
- Owner: February 1906: The Clan Line Steamers; August 1906: Charles W Cayzer, James Mackenzie, David Rennie
- Operator: Cayzer, Irvine & Co, Ltd
- Port of registry: Glasgow
- Ordered: October 1904
- Builder: Furness, Withy, West Hartlepool
- Cost: £63,500
- Yard number: 289
- Launched: 27 November 1905
- Completed: 10 April 1906
- Maiden voyage: 22 March 1906: Birkenhead – Chittagong via the Suez Canal
- Identification: UK official number 121305; code letters HFQJ
- Fate: captured and sunk, 14 September 1914

General characteristics
- Type: cargo steamship
- Tonnage: 4,775 GRT, 3,053 NRT, 7,500 DWT
- Length: 400.0 ft (121.9 m)
- Beam: 51.0 ft (15.5 m)
- Depth: 27.2 ft (8.3 m)
- Decks: 2
- Installed power: 1 × triple expansion engine, 2,300 ihp, 448 NHP
- Propulsion: 1 × screw
- Speed: 10 3/4 knots (20 km/h)
- Crew: 70
- Notes: sister ships: Clan Macpherson, Clan Macintosh

SS Clan Matheson was a UK cargo steamship that was sunk in the First World War. She was launched in West Hartlepool in 1905 for Clan Line, who used her on its routes between British India and Europe. The German cruiser SMS Emden captured and sank her in the Indian Ocean in 1914. She was Clan Line's first war loss in the First World War.

She was the second of five Clan Line ships to be named after the Scottish clan Clan Matheson. The first had been launched in 1883, and Clan Line sold her in February 1905; after ordering the second Clan Matheson, but before she was delivered.

== Three sister ships ==
In October 1904, Clan Line ordered a set of three sister ships from Furness, Withy & Co, Ltd of West Hartlepool, on the River Tees. The choice of shipbuilder may have been influenced by the fact that Clan Line's chairman, Charles W Cayzer, was friends with Christopher Furness, one of the co-founders of Furness, Withy.

Furness, Withy's shipyard in Middleton, Hartlepool built the three ships as yard numbers 287, 288, and 289. 287 was launched on 1 September 1905 as Clan Macpherson; 288 was launched on 13 October 1905 as Clan Macintosh; and 289 was launched on 27 November 1905 as Clan Matheson. On 28 February 1906, Clan Line registered Clan Matheson in Glasgow; and on 10 April that year, Furness Withy delivered her to her new owners. Her UK official number was 121305, and her code letters were HFQJ.

Clan Matheson's registered length was 400.0 ft (121.9 m), her beam was 51.0 ft (15.5 m), and her depth was 27.2 ft (8.3 m). Her tonnages were 4,775 GRT, 3,053 NRT, and 7,500 DWT. She had a single screw, driven by a three-cylinder triple expansion engine built by Richardsons Westgarth & Company of Hartlepool; a manufacturer in which Furness, Withy had a controlling interest. The engine was rated at 448 NHP or 2,300 ihp, and gave the ship a cruising speed of 10 3/4 knots (20 km/h). She carried a crew of 70 officers and men.

== Peacetime career ==
On 22 March 1906, Clan Matheson left Birkenhead on her maiden voyage, which was to British India via the Suez Canal. She called at numerous Indian ports, including Chittagong in Bengal; returned via the Suez Canal; and arrived back in London on 17 July 1906.

McArthur Shipping & Agency Co, Ltd invited Clan Line to start trading between Australia and the UK. Charles W Cayzer doubted whether the venture would be profitable, but his sons, including August and Herbert, saw potential in it, and prevailed over him. Clan Matheson's second voyage inaugurated this new service, leaving Liverpool on 12 August 1906. She called at Cape Town, East London and other ports in Cape Colony; then at Galle in Ceylon; and then sailed in ballast to South Australia, where on 13 November she reached Port Pirie, where she loaded about 2,000 tons of rare metal concentrates. She then loaded baled wool at Sydney; called at Melbourne; and loaded wheat and more wool at Adelaide, where she left on 7 December. She returned via the Suez Canal, and in February delivered her wheat to Antwerp, and her wool from Adelaide to mainland Europe.

For her next three voyages, Clan Matheson then reverted to her owners' main trade, which was between Britain and India. Typically she left from either Greenock, Liverpool, or both, and returned to London. The Indian terminus of her voyage was usually at Chittagong, via several other Indian ports, depending on her cargo. On her fifth voyage, which was from January to April 1908, these included Vizagapatam, Madras (now Chennai), and Cuddalore. On some voyages she also served either Colombo or Galle in Ceylon. Homeward voyages were via the Suez Canal, but outward voyages were via either Suez or Cape Colony, as Clan Line sometimes took outward cargoes to the Cape. The outward leg of her fifth voyage also included a call at Beira in Mozambique.

For her sixth voyage, American & Australian Line chartered Clan Matheson to take cargo from New York to Australia. On 6 June 1908 she left Swansea for New York, where she loaded steel rails, wire, barbed wire, other manufactured goods, processed foodstuffs, and other general cargo. On 25 July she left New York, and on 19 September she reached Albany, Western Australia, where she bunkered. She called at Melbourne, and spent a fortnight in Sydney. 1908 was the year that Clan Line extended its Australian service to New Zealand. Clan Matheson sailed from Sydney to Auckland and Dunedin, and then returned to Australia, calling first at Port Pirie. She called at Melbourne; loaded baled wool and 77 tons of tallow in Sydney; more wool in Melbourne; called at Adelaide; returned via the Suez Canal; and on 8 February 1909 arrived in Dunkirk.

== Loss ==
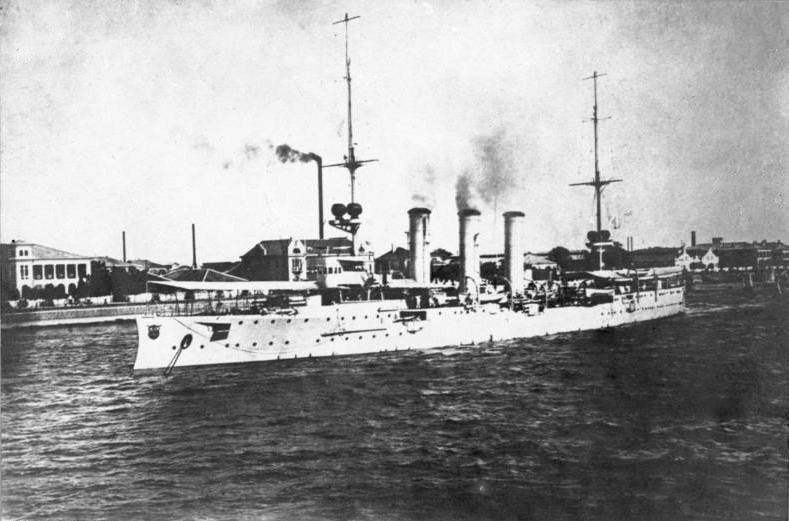
The cruiser SMS Emden in Tsingtao (now Qingdao) in January 1914

On 11 July 1914, Clan Matheson left Glasgow for India. She called at Birkenhead, and reached Port Said on 3 August, which was the day when Germany declared war against France. The UK declared war against Germany the next day. She called at Colombo; discharged cargo at Madras; and on 12 September left Madras for Calcutta. At about 22:30 hrs on 14 September she was in the Bay of Bengal, about 60 nautical miles (110 km) south of the mouth of the Hooghly River, when her lookouts sighted the lights of two steamships approaching. At 23:30 hrs, the nearer of the two ships fired warning shots at Clan Matheson, and in Morse code via signal lamp ordered her to stop, which she did. The nearer ship was a cruiser, which hove to about 400 yards (370 m) from Clan Matheson, and boarded her with a party of three officers and 20 men.

The cruiser was SMS Emden, and the ship following her was the HAPAG cargo ship Markomannia. Emden's boarding party politely ordered Clan Matheson's crew to leave their ship; allowing them to take clothes and other personal belongings with them; and transferred them to Markomannia. The boarding party used explosives to scuttle Clan Matheson. As she sank, Emden trained a searchlight on her, and fired on her for gunnery target practice. She sank at 02:50 hrs on 15 September.

Also with Emden was a captured Greek cargo ship, Embiricos Brothers' Pontoporos, whose cargo was coal. The next day, the Germans ordered Clan Matheson's lascar deck crew and engine room crew to help bunker Emden with coal from Pontoporos. At the end of the transhipment, the Germans paid each lascar 50 US cents.

On 17 September, Emden stopped the neutral Norwegian steamship Dovre, and transferred Clan Matheson's crew to her. Two days later, Dovre landed them at Rangoon in Burma (now Yangon in Myanmar).

== Bibliography ==
- Clarkson, John; Fenton, Roy; Munro, Archie (2007). Clan Line Illustrated Fleet History. Preston: Ships in Focus Publications. ISBN 978-1-901703-47-4.
- Haws, Duncan (1997). Clan, Houston, Turnbull Martin & Scottish Tankers. Merchant Fleets. Vol. 33. Pembroke: TCL Publications. ISBN 978-0946378333.
- Lloyd's Register of British and Foreign Shipping. Vol. I.–Steamers. London: Lloyd's Register of Shipping. 1906 – via Internet Archive.
- Mercantile Navy List. London: Registrar General of Shipping and Seamen. 1907 – via Crew List Index Project.
