= SS Clan Macneil (1921) =

History

United Kingdom
- Name: Clan Macneil
- Namesake: Clan MacNeil
- Owner: Clan Line Steamers Ltd, London
- Operator: Cayzer, Irvine & Co, Ltd
- Port of registry: Glasgow
- Builder: Ayrshire Dockyard, Irvine
- Cost: £330,000
- Yard number: 489
- Launched: 1 December 1921
- Completed: February 1922
- Identification: UK official number 146281; code letters KLRC (until 1933); call sign GFWP (1934 onward)
- Fate: Scrapped in 1952

General characteristics
- Class & type: Clan Macnab-class cargo liner
- Tonnage: 6,111 GRT; 3,788 NRT
- Length: 410 ft 6 in (125.12 m)
- Beam: 53.3 ft (16.25 m)
- Draught: 27 ft 9 in (8.46 m)
- Depth: 33.4 ft (10.18 m)
- Decks: 2
- Installed power: 560 NHP as built, 691 NHP after 1929
- Propulsion: Built with triple-expansion engine.; Exhaust steam turbine added 1929
- Speed: 12 knots (22 km/h)
- Sensors & processing systems: wireless direction finding
- Notes: sister ships: Clan Macnab, Clan Macnair, Clan Macnaughton, Clan Macfarlane, Clan Macfadyen

SS Clan Macneil was a UK steam cargo liner. She was launched in 1921, survived the Second World War and scrapped in 1952. She spent her entire career with Clan Line.

== Details ==
The Ayrshire Dockyard Co Ltd of Irvine, Ayrshire, built a class of six sister ships for Clan Line. Clan Macnab was launched in 1921 and gave her name to the class. Clan Macnair, Clan Macnaughton and Clan Macneil were launched in 1921, ClanMacfarlane was launched in 1922 and Clan Macfadyen was launched in 1923.

Clan Macneil was launched on 1 December 1921, completed in February 1922 and passed her sea trials on 14 February.

Clan Line named its ships after Scottish clans. Clan MacNeil is a clan centred on the island of Barra.

Clan Macneil was 410 ft 6 in (125.12 m) long, had a beam of 53.3 ft (16.25 m) and draught of 27 ft 9 in (8.46 m). Her tonnages were 6,111 GRT and 3,788 NRT.

Dunsmuir and Jackson of Glasgow built Clan Macneil's triple-expansion steam engine, which developed 560 NHP. In October 1929 Deutsche Schiff- und Maschinenbau added a Bauer-Wach exhaust steam turbine, which increased her total power to 691 NHP and was designed to increase her fuel economy and speed.

Clan Macneil's UK official number was 146281. Her code letters were KLRC until 1933–34, when they were superseded by the call sign GFWP.

== Career ==
Clan Line operated cargo liner services between Britain, India, South Africa and East Africa, and also Australia and the USA.

On 8 August 1937 Clan Macneil collided with the Belgian cargo ship Princess Marie Jose in the North Sea off Dunkirk, France. Five of Princess Marie Jose's passengers were seriously injured. Princess Marie Jose beached herself there to avoid sinking, and was refloated on 10 August.

The UK Government requisitioned Clan Macneil on 23 March 1940. The Ministry of War Transport returned her to her owners on 11 MArch 1946. Of the six Clan Macnab-class ships, she was one of only two that survived the Second World War.

Clan Macneil arrived in Port Glasgow on 1 May 1952 to be scrapped by Smith and Houston. Demolition work started the next day.

== Bibliography ==
- Clarkson, John; Fenton, Roy; Munro, Archie (2007). Clan Line Illustrated Fleet History. Preston: Ships in Focus. ISBN 978-1-901703-47-4.
- Harnack, Edwin P (1938) [1903]. All About Ships & Shipping (7th ed.). London: Faber and Faber.
- Jordan, Roger (1999). The World's Merchant Fleets: 1939. The Particulars and Wartime Fates of 6,000 Ships. London: Chatham Publishing. ISBN 1-86176-023-X.
- Talbot-Booth, EC (1936). Ships and the Sea (Third ed.). London: Sampson Low, Marston & Co Ltd.
