= SS Clan Macalister (1903) =

History

United Kingdom
- Name: Clan Macalister
- Owner: Clan Line Steamers Ltd
- Operator: Cayzer, Irvine & Co Ltd
- Builder: Archibald McMillan & Son, Dumbarton
- Yard number: 389
- Launched: 18 March 1903
- Christened: Clan Macalister
- Commissioned: April 1903
- Homeport: Glasgow
- Identification: UK Official Number 115756; Call sign VBDL
- Fate: Sunk, November 6, 1915

General characteristics
- Type: Cargo ship
- Tonnage: 4,835 GRT; 3,065 NRT; deadweight 7,400
- Length: 395 ft 0 in (120.40 m)
- Beam: 51 ft 1 in (15.57 m)
- Depth: 27 ft 0 in (8.23 m)
- Installed power: 450 Nhp
- Propulsion: Dunsmuir & Jackson 3-cylinder triple expansion
- Speed: 10.5 knots

Clan Macalister was a steam ship built in 1903 by the Archibald McMillan & Son of Dumbarton. She was the second ship named Clan Macalister in service with the Clan Line used on their Oriental routes.

== Design and construction ==
In 1902 Clan Line sold their old steamer Clan Macalister, and placed an order with Archibald McMillan & Son of Dumbarton to build a new ship for them. The ship was launched on 18 March 1903 and after sea trials was commissioned in April of the same year. As built, the ship was 395 feet 0 inches (120.40 m) long (between perpendiculars) and 51 feet 1 inch (15.57 m) abeam, a mean draft of 27 feet 0 inches (8.23 m). Clan Macalister was assessed at 4,835 GRT and 3,065 NRT. The vessel had a steel hull, and a single 450 nhp triple-expansion steam engine, with cylinders of 26-inch (66 cm), 43-inch (110 cm), and 71-inch (180 cm) diameter with a 48-inch (120 cm) stroke, that drove a single screw propeller, and moved the ship at up to 10.5 knots (12.1 mph; 19.4 km/h).

== Operational history ==
In early 1900s, the Clan Line operated two main routes between United Kingdom and her colonies in the East. The first one was a direct route from the home ports through the Strait of Gibraltar, Suez Canal and to the ports of India and Ceylon. The second one involved sailing down the western coast of Africa first to the ports of South African colonies, then onto the ports of Ceylon and India, and occasional trips to Australia.

Clan Macalister departed for her maiden voyage from Barrow on 3 May 1903 for South Africa.

=== Sinking ===
Wreck location

On 6 November 1915 Clan Macalister, while on a passage from Liverpool to Calcutta with general cargo, was captured by the German submarine U-35, in an approximate position 33°10′N 25°50′E, about 120 miles southeast off Cape Martello, Crete, and was subsequently sunk with a torpedo.
