= SS Delphic (1925) =

British freighter and cargo ship

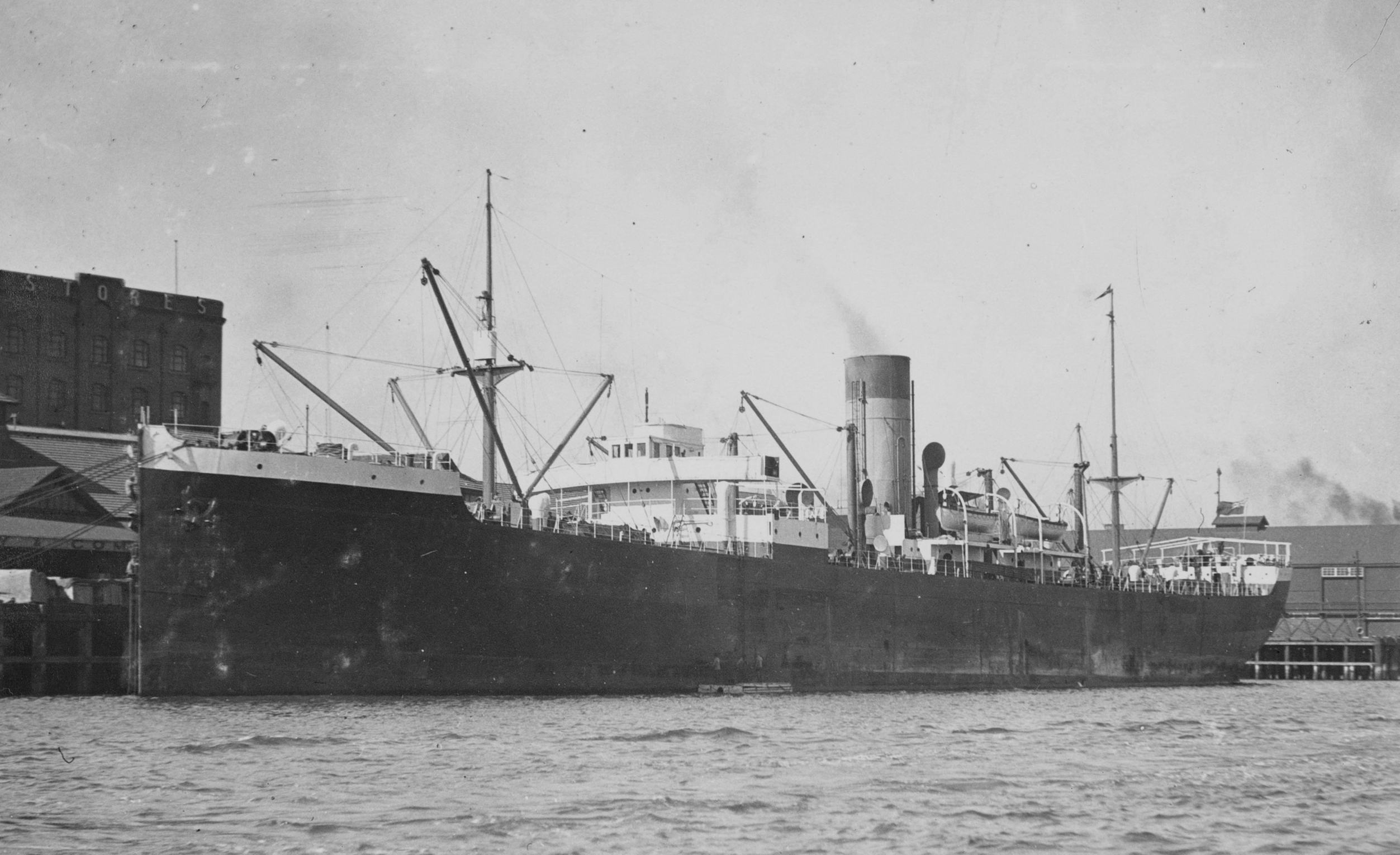

History

United Kingdom
- Name: War Icarus (1918–1919); Mesaba (1919–1925); Delphic (1925–1933); Clan Farquhar (1933–1948)
- Owner: Shipping Controller (1918–1919); Atlantic Transport Line (1919–1925); White Star Line (1925–1933); Clan Line (1933–1948)
- Operator: Booth Line (1918–1919); Atlantic Transport Line (1919–1925); White Star Line (1925–1933); Clan Line (1933–1948)
- Route: North Atlantic; United Kingdom–Australia
- Builder: Harland & Wolff
- Yard number: 540
- Launched: 19 September 1918
- Completed: 31 October 1918
- In service: 1918
- Out of service: 1948
- Fate: Scrapped July 1948

General characteristics
- Class & type: Type G freighter
- Tonnage: 8,002 GRT
- Length: 450 ft (140 m)
- Beam: 58.4 ft (17.8 m)
- Installed power: 2 × triple expansion steam engines
- Propulsion: 2 propellers
- Speed: 12.5–13 knots (23.2–24.1 km/h; 14.4–15.0 mph)

Delphic was a British freighter operated by the White Star Line, the company's second ship to bear this name. She was built by the Harland & Wolff shipyards in 1916 to serve the war effort under the name of War Icarus, belonging to the series of "Type G" cargo ships. Launched in September 1918 and commissioned in the following October, she was the only ship in the series to be completed before the end of the First World War. During this time, she was operated by a Liverpool company.

In 1919, she was bought by the Atlantic Transport Line, which renamed her Mesaba and operated her for six years. She was then transferred to Atlantic's sister company, White Star, in 1925, and renamed Delphic, to replace another cargo ship of the same type that had been damaged the previous year, Bardic. For the next eight years, the ship served on the Australian service. In 1933, the company, preparing to merge with the Cunard Line, sold off its now unwanted ships. Delphic was sold, along with sister ship Gallic, to the Clan Line which renamed her Clan Farquhar. She continued to operate on the route to Australia until she was withdrawn for scrapping in 1948, after a total of thirty years of service.

== History ==
In 1916, in the middle of the First World War, the Harland & Wolff shipyard received orders for a series of 22 so-called "Type G" freighters to serve the war effort by transporting goods. Among those built in the Belfast yard was War Icarus, which was launched on 19 September 1918, and delivered the following October. It was then, very briefly, managed by the Booth Line on behalf of the Shipping Controller. War Icarus was the only ship of its class to enter service before the end of hostilities.

In May 1919, the ship, no longer required by the government, was sold to the Atlantic Transport Line and renamed Mesaba. This was the second ship of this name for the company, which lost its first Mesaba a few months earlier when it was sunk by UB-118. The company belonged to the International Mercantile Marine Co. (IMM), a trust which managed several shipping companies. One of them, the White Star Line, had acquired two type G cargo ships in 1919, Bardic and Gallic, which were used on the route to Australia. However, in 1924, Bardic ran aground and was badly damaged. In order to replace the vessel, Mesaba was transferred to White Star after being overhauled at the Harland & Wolff yards.

Renamed Delphic, the second company ship bearing this name, the original being a passenger-cargo liner of 1897, the ship served Australia as a replacement for Bardic, while the latter was repaired and assigned to another company in IMM. By 1933, Delphic and Gallic were no longer required by the company, which was about to merge with the Cunard Line. Delphic was sold in October to the Clan Line for £53,000.

Renamed Clan Farquhar, she continued to serve on the Australian route alongside the former Gallic, now Clan Colquhoun. In July 1948, after an uneventful career of fifteen years with Clan Line, she was scrapped at Milford Haven.

== Design ==
Delphic was a wartime ship built quickly and for purely functional purposes, sporting a funnel and two masts that supported the loading cranes. Its navigating bridge was the only superstructure, located a little in front of the funnel, which bore the colours of the White Star Line (brown ochre topped with black). With a length of 450 ft (140 m) and a beam of 58.4 ft (17.8 m), it measured 8,002 gross register tons (GRT) and had six holds. Driven by two propellers powered by two triple expansion engines, she could reach a relatively low speed for the time, from 12.5–13 knots (23.2–24.1 km/h; 14.4–15.0 mph). White Star had, during the 1920s, two other similar cargo ships, Bardic and Gallic, which differ only in their tonnage, slightly lower in the case of the latter.

== Bibliography ==
- Roy Anderson (1964). White Star. T. Stephenson & Sons Ltd. p. 236.
- Richard de Kerbrech (2009). Ships of the White Star Line. Ian Allan Publishing. p. 240. ISBN 978-0-7110-3366-5.
- John Eaton and Charles Haas (1989). Falling Star, Misadventures of White Star Line Ships. Patrick Stephens Ltd. p. 256. ISBN 1-85260-084-5.
- Duncan Haws (1990). Merchant Fleets : White Star Line. TCL Publications. p. 104. ISBN 0-946378-16-9.
- Friedman, Norman (2014). Fighting the Great War at Sea: Strategy, Tactic and Technology. Barnsley: Seaforth Publishing. ISBN 978-1-84832-189-2.
