= SS Clan Matheson (1919) =

Cargo ship

History
- Name: Clan Morgan (1919); Clan Matheson (1919–48); Harmodius (1948–51); Claire T (1951–55); Empire Claire (1955)
- Owner: Clan Line Steamers Ltd (1919–48); British & South American Steam Navigation Co Ltd (1948–51); Heron Steamship Co Ltd (1951–53); Romney Steamship Co Ltd (1953–55); Ministry of Transport (1955)
- Operator: Cayzer, Irvine & Co Ltd (1919–48); Houston Line Ltd (1948–51); Heron Steamship Co Ltd (1951–53); Romney Steamship Co Ltd (1953–55); Ministry of Transport (1955)
- Port of registry: (United Kingdom) Glasgow (1919–48); United Kingdom (1948–51); (United Kingdom) London (1951–55)
- Builder: William Hamilton & Co
- Yard number: 311
- Laid down: 1917
- Launched: 18 February 1919
- Completed: April 1919
- Out of service: 27 July 1955
- Identification: UK code letters JWPR (1919–33); Call sign GQMW (1934–48); UK official number 141896
- Fate: scuttled

General characteristics
- Type: Cargo ship
- Tonnage: 5,614 GRT; tonnage under deck 5,348; 3,458 NRT
- Length: 397.1 ft (121.04 m)
- Beam: 51.4 ft (15.67 m)
- Draught: 27 ft 5 in (8.36 m)
- Depth: 34.0 ft (10.36 m)
- Installed power: 517 NHP
- Propulsion: 3-cylinder triple-expansion steam engine; single screw propeller
- Speed: 12 knots (22 km/h)
- Sensors & processing systems: direction finding equipment

Clan Matheson was a 5,614 GRT cargo ship that William Hamilton & Co Ltd of Port Glasgow built in 1919 as Clan Morgan for Clan Line Steamers Ltd. She was sold in 1948 and renamed Harmodius. In 1951 she was sold again and renamed Claire T. In 1955 she was bought by the Ministry of Transport (MoT) which renamed her Empire Claire. She was scuttled on 27 July 1955 with a cargo of obsolete chemical materiel.

== Description ==
William Hamilton & Co Ltd built her as yard number 311. She was a sister ship to SS Chronos and SS Macedon. She was laid down in 1917 and launched on 18 February 1919 as Clan Morgan, and completed in April that year.

She was 397.1 ft (121.04 m) long, with a beam of 51.4 ft (15.67 m) and a depth of 34.0 ft (10.36 m). She had a NRT of 3,458 and tonnage under deck of 6,348.

She had nine corrugated furnaces with a combined grate area of 190 square feet (18 m^{2}) heating three single-ended boilers with a combined heating surface of 7,668 square feet (712 m^{2}). These produced steam at 180 lb_{f}/in^{2} for a single three-cylinder triple expansion steam engine that drove a single screw propeller. David Rowan & Co Ltd of Glasgow built the engine, which had cylinders of 27 inches (69 cm), 44 inches (110 cm) and 73 inches (190 cm) diameter by 48 inches (120 cm) stroke and was rated at 517 NHP.

== History ==
=== Pre-war ===
Clan Matheson was ordered by Australian Steamship Ltd, Sydney in 1917 as the 4,360 GRT Bogong. It was later decided to rename her You Yangs. The contract was sold to Clan Line Steamers Ltd on the orders of the British Shipping Controller. Her design was modified and she was lengthened.

Clan Matheson was placed under the management of Cayzer, Irvine & Co Ltd, who registered her at Glasgow. Her United Kingdom official number was 141086 and her code letters were JWPR. In 1934 her code letters were replaced with the Call sign GQMW. Clan Matheson was a cargo ship, and also served as a cadet training ship.

In 1924 the Levuana Moth (Levuana iridescens) was a serious pest to coconut palms in Fiji and a biological solution was devised. A similar moth, Artona catoxantha was known to be parasitized by Ptychomyia and Apanteles, so it was decided to use these parasites to eradicate the Levuana Moth. The parasites had to be imported from Singapore to Fiji. Most ships at that time sailed not direct but via Australia, which would have meant putting the parasites into quarantine in Australia.

Clan Line operated ships in the area. In July 1924 Clan Mackay was sailing from Singapore to Fiji via other ports, and Clan Matheson was also due to sail from Java to Fiji. Clan Mackay took the parasites to Surabaya, Java, where they were transferred to Clan Matheson for onward shipment to Fiji. No Apanteles survived, but the Ptychomia did and their introduction succeeded in eradicating the Levuana Moth within two years.

=== Second World War ===
In the Second World War Clan Matheson sailed in convoys.

==== OG 3 ====
In October 1939 Clan Matheson carried general cargo from Britain to East Africa. She joined Convoy OG 3, which formed at sea on 17 October 1939 and took her as far as Gibraltar.

==== OG 22 ====
Clan Matheson was a member of Convoy OG 22, which formed at sea on 18 March 1940 bound for Gibraltar.

==== HX 228 ====
In February 1943 Clan Matheson loaded sugar and general cargo in North America. She was due to join Convoy HX 228, which left New York on 28 February 1943 and reached Liverpool on 15 March, but instead she returned to port.

==== HX 229 ====
The following month Clan Matheson, carrying general cargo, mail and a passenger, joined Convoy HX 229 and carried the convoy's Vice Commodore. HX 229 left New York on 8 March 1943 bound for Liverpool, and Clan Matheson was meant to sail with the convoy as far as Loch Ewe, but she was unable to maintain speed and put into Halifax, Nova Scotia.

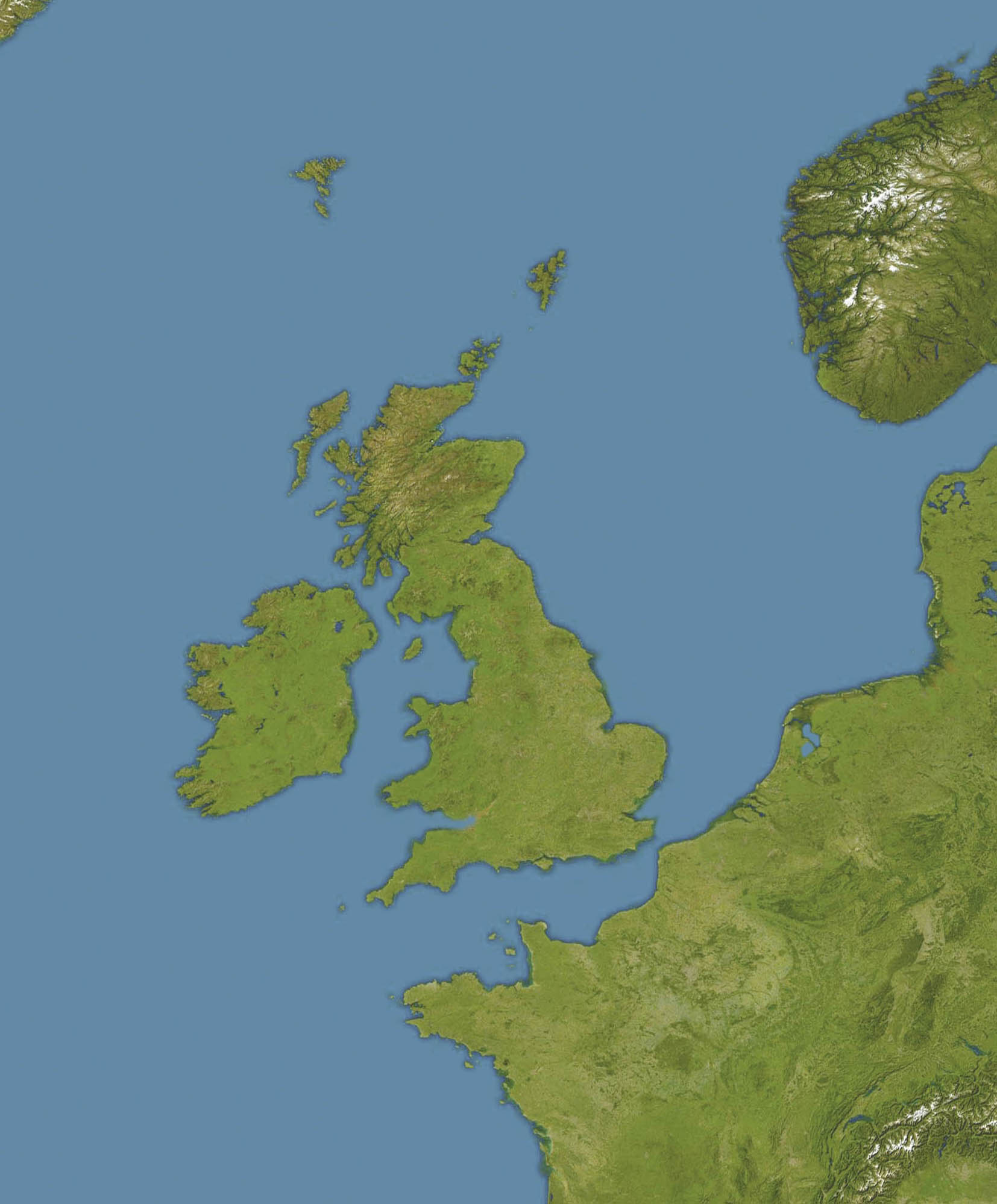
Approximate position of Empire Claire's wreck

=== Post war ===
In 1948 Clan Matheson was sold to British & South American Steam Navigation Co Ltd, which renamed her Harmodius and appointed Houston Line Ltd to manage her. In 1951 she was sold to the Heron Steamship Co Ltd of London who renamed her Claire T. In 1953 she was sold to the Romney Steamship Co Ltd, serving until 1955 when she was purchased by the MoT and renamed Empire Claire.

As part of Operation Sandcastle she was loaded with obsolete war materiel which included confiscated German munitions containing Tabun. Loaded with 16,000 bombs, On 27 July 1955 Empire Claire was towed out of Stranraer and scuttled in the North Atlantic 800 miles northwest of County Donegal, Ireland at 56°30′N 12°00′W.

== Commemorative postage stamp ==
On 19 September 2013 Royal Mail issued a set of six postage stamps commemorating the British Merchant Navy. The set includes three different designs of £1.28 stamp, one of which is a painting of Clan Matheson under way in a heavy sea.
