= SS Clan Alpine (1942) =

British cargo ship

- Clan Alpine stranded in 1961

History
- Name: Empire Barrie (1942-45); Clan Alpine (1945-57); Umvoti (1957-59); Clan Alpine (1959-61)
- Owner: Ministry of War Transport (1942-45); Clan Line Steamers Ltd (1945-57); Bullard, King & Co (1957-59); Clan Line Steamers Ltd (1959-61)
- Operator: Allen, Black & Co Ltd (1942-44); Cayzer, Irvine & Co Ltd (1944-45); Clan Line Steamers Ltd (1945-57); Bullard, King & Co (1957-59); Clan Line Steamers Ltd (1959-61)
- Port of registry: (United Kingdom) Sunderland (1942-45); (United Kingdom) Glasgow (1945-57); (United Kingdom) London (1957-61)
- Builder: J L Thompson & Sons Ltd, Sunderland
- Yard number: 615
- Launched: 17 January 1942
- Completed: April 1942
- Out of service: 31 October 1960
- Identification: UK Official Number 169016; Code Letters BDRD (1942-45)
- Fate: Scrapped February 1961

General characteristics
- Tonnage: 7,168 GRT; 4,523 NRT
- Length: 423 ft 8 in (129.13 m)
- Beam: 57 ft 2 in (17.42 m)
- Depth: 34 ft 9 in (10.59 m)
- Propulsion: 1 x triple expansion steam engine (George Clark (1938) Ltd, Sunderland) 2,510 hp (1,870 kW), supplied by 3 x Scotch boilers. 2 x Belliss and Morcom steam powered generators.
- Speed: 10.5 knots (19.4 km/h)
- Armament: 1 x 4" gun, 1 x 3" gun, 8 x machine guns (Empire Barrie)

Location of the stranding of Clan Alpine.

Clan Alpine was a cargo ship built in 1942 for the Ministry of War Transport (MoWT) as Empire Barrie. She was sold to Clan Line Steamers Ltd in 1947 and served with them until 1957 when she was sold to Bullard, King & Co Ltd and renamed Umvoti. In 1959 she was sold back to Clan Line and renamed Clan Alpine. She was sold for scrap in 1960 and wrecked in a cyclone in October 1960 at Chittagong, East Pakistan, finally being scrapped in February 1961. She can be seen early on in the 1950 film "Waterfront" (an early film starring Richard Burton).

== History ==
Empire Barrie was built by J L Thompson & Sons Ltd, Sunderland as yard number 615. She was launched on 17 January 1942 and completed in April 1942. Empire Barrie was built for the MoWT and was initially placed under the management of Allan, Black & Co. In 1944, management passed to Cayzer, Irvine & Co Ltd.

=== War service ===
In May 1943, Empire Barrie delivered 24 Spitfire aircraft to Casablanca, Morocco. JL166, JL175, JL 179, JL185, JL188 and JL219.

Empire Barrie was a member of a number of convoys during the Second World War.

SL 134

Convoy SL 134 sailed from Freetown, Sierra Leone on 28 July 1943 and arrived at Liverpool on 19 August. Empire Barrie was in carrying a cargo of manganese ore from Takoradi, Gold Coast.

SC 144

Convoy SC 144 which sailed from Halifax, Nova Scotia on 11 October 1943 and arrived at Liverpool on 27 October. Empire Barrie was carrying general cargo and bound for London.

KMS 37

Convoy KMS 37 sailed from Liverpool on 25 December 1943 and arrived at Gibraltar on 7 January 1944. Empire Barrie was carrying general cargo and ammunition and was bound for Port Sudan, Aden and Dar es Salaam.

MKS 47

Convoy MKS 47 sailed from Port Said on 19 April 1944

=== Postwar ===
In 1945, Empire Barrie was sold to Clan Line Steamers Ltd and renamed Clan Alpine She was the fourth Clan Line ship to bear that name. In 1952, she underwent a series of tests with the Ocean Vulcan. On 3 February 1956, six crewmembers were killed by carbon monoxide fumes from a makeshift brazier they had set up in their cabin whilst the ship was in dry dock at Glasgow undergoing repairs. In 1957 she was sold to Bullard, King and Co Ltd and renamed Umvoti, serving with them until 1959 when she was sold back to Clan Line and renamed Clan Alpine. She was sold to Japanese shipbreakers, with delivery scheduled for November 1960. Although in good condition, her maximum speed of 10.5 knots (19.4 km/h) made her too slow for the route she was employed on (United Kingdom - East Africa - India - Pakistan - Ceylon - Australia).

=== Final voyage ===
On 16 September 1960, Clan Alpine sailed from the Mersey for Chittagong, via Glasgow, the Suez Canal, Assab, Djibouti, Aden, Bombay, Cochin and Tuticorin. She arrived at Chittagong at 01:30hrs on 31 October and anchored to await a berth at the docks. Orders had been received at Bombay for Clan Alpine to proceed to Vizag or Rangoon to embark cargo bound for Japan after she had discharged her cargo at Chittagong. This was to be delivered before she made her way to Onomichi for scrapping.

It was reported that a cyclone was heading for Chittagong, and by 18:35 hrs there were reports that the wind was exceeding Force 12. Although Clan Alpine's engine was at "Full Ahead" she was being dragged astern up the Sandwip Channel at 35 knots (65 km/h) dragging both anchors with her. A 35 feet (11 m) storm surge had struck the area. The Chittagong Meteorological Office recorded windspeeds in excess of 120 knots (220 km/h) at the height of the cyclone. It was later revealed that the wind had peaked at 135 knots (250 km/h). At 18:50 hrs, the eye of the storm passed over the ship and at 19:25 hrs a bump was felt and it was reported that the ship had run aground. The engines were stopped, but a request was made for them to be restarted as the ship was apparently near rocks. The rocks were quickly revealed to be the tops of palm trees.

The engines and two of the three boilers were shut down, leaving one boiler supplying steam to run the generators and other auxiliary equipment. Clan Alpine had come to rest upright, some 11 miles (18 km) upstream of the Karnaphuli River mouth at Skonai Chori (22°25′N 91°44′E). A message was sent by radio to Clan Line's head office in London informing them of the situation. The reply received asked for confirmation of the position of Clan Alpine. The President of Pakistan, General Mohammed Ayub Khan paid a visit to the ship by helicopter. The crew were made honorary members of the Chittagong Club, which enabled them to use bungalows owned by the club as a break from staying aboard the ship.

Salvage engineers assessed that it was practical to salvage the ship, but not economical to do so. To keep the boilers supplied with water, sea water was pumped on board during each high tide, using a diesel powered fire pump. The generators were only used at night to help preserve stocks of fresh water on board ship. Clan Alpine was carrying 2,400 tons of general cargo. A road was constructed linking the ship with the main Chittagong highway, and the cargo was discharged into lorries by using the ship's steam winches. The last of the cargo was unloaded on 4 January 1961. Queen Elizabeth II and Prince Philip visited the ship during the time that she was stranded. Clan Alpine was declared a constructive total loss, and sold on 14 February 1961 to East Bengal Trading Corporation Ltd and scrapped in situ. She was sold for about £50,000.

== Propulsion ==
She was powered by a triple expansion steam engine of 2,510 horsepower (1,870 kW) which was built by George Clark (1938) Ltd, Sunderland. Steam was supplied by three Scotch boilers. Electricity was supplied by two Belliss and Morcom steam powered generators.

== Official Number and code letters ==
Official Numbers were a forerunner to IMO Numbers. The ship had the UK Official Number 169016. Empire Barrie and Clan Alpine used the Code Letters BDRD.
