= Clan Line =

Passenger and cargo shipping company

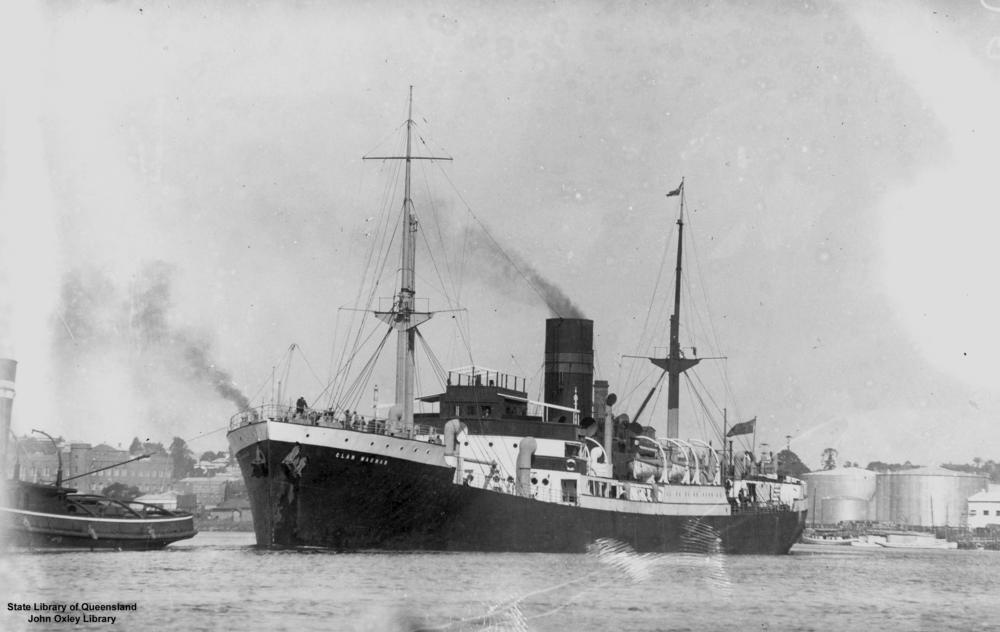
- Clan MacNab at Brisbane in 1933
- Formerly: C. W. Cayzer & Company
- Industry: Passenger and cargo shipping
- Founded: 1877 in Liverpool, England
- Founder: Charles Cayzer
- Defunct: 1987
- Headquarters: Glasgow, Scotland
- Area served: Global
- Key people: Captain William Irvine,

The Clan Line was a passenger and cargo shipping company that operated in one incarnation or another from the late nineteenth century and into the twentieth century.

== History ==
=== Foundation and early years ===
The company that would become the Clan Line was first founded as C. W. Cayzer & Company in Liverpool in 1877 by Charles Cayzer (see Cayzer baronets). It was set up to operate passenger routes between Britain and Bombay, India via the Suez Canal. The next year, Captain William Irvine joined the company and it was renamed Cayzer, Irvine & Company.

In 1881 the company was joined by an influential Glasgow businessman and his firm of Thomas Dunlop & Sons, and the Clan Line Association of Steamers was established. The company opened a new head office at 109 Hope Street, Glasgow. Cayzer, Irvine built and managed ships for the association and Cayzer himself retained ownership of the original six Clan ships. At the same time, they expanded their operations to South Africa. In 1890 the company became The Clan Line of Steamers Limited with Cayzer holding the majority interest. The company again expanded its operations with the purchase of the Persian Gulf Steam Ship Company in 1894, bringing four more ships into the company. They used these new assets to expand their routes into the Persian Gulf and to North America, and to begin to carry cargo.

The company was incorporated in 1907 as Cayzer, Irvine & Company, Limited, with the Cayzer family retaining control. Charles Cayzer died in 1916, with his sons continuing to run the company. In 1918 they acquired and incorporated the assets of the Scottish Shire Line. Despite suffering losses in the First World War, the company had recovered by the 1930s to become the largest cargo carrying concern in the world.

=== The Clan Line at war and after ===
Clan Line saw a large number of its ships either requisitioned by the British government, or otherwise used to ship vital supplies to Britain during the First and Second World Wars. Their ubiquitousness led to them being called the 'Scots Navy' (due to their officers' sleeve rings being identical to those of the Royal Navy) and they were often in dangerous environments, at risk from mines, air attacks or German U-boats.

During the Second World War, for example, three of the Line's Cameron class steamers were requisitioned in 1942 by the Royal Navy whilst still under construction at Greenock Dockyard and commissioned as HMS Athene (aircraft transporter), HMS Engadine (aircraft transporter) and HMS Bonaventure (submarine depot ship for X-craft). The Clan Line lost a total of 30 ships in the 1939-45 war.

After the end of the war, the Clan Line commissioned six vessels of the Clan MacLaren class (commonly known as the MacL's) to replace war losses and resume a level of pre-war services. Construction started in 1946 and all six had entered service by 1949. Meanwhile, the immediate shortage was alleviated by the acquisition of a number of wartime standard construction ships, such as the American Liberty ships. Most of these would continue to serve with the Clan Line fleet until 1962, by which time the first vessels of the Clan MacIver class were entering service. Meanwhile, management attempted to further alleviate the shortfall with the purchase of the Thompson Steam Shipping Co. in 1952 and the conversion to motor ships throughout the 1950s.

=== Post war restructuring ===
In 1956, under the impetus of Nicholas Cayzer the Clan Line joined with the Union-Castle Line, King Line and Bullard King & Company to form British & Commonwealth Shipping Limited. A number of transfers then took place between the component companies. They formed the Springbok Shipping Company in 1959 to take over the operations of their South African services, and several of the Clan Lines' ships were transferred to it. In 1961 the Springbok Shipping Company became part of Safmarine.

== Shipping ==
The ships of the Clan Line were usually distinguishable by their names, the vast majority of which had the prefix 'Clan'. Their funnel markings were black with two red bands divided by narrow black band, and they flew the house flag, which was a rectangular red flag bearing a white diamond with a red rampant lion in the centre.

=== Ships of the Clan Line ===
Ship	Built	GRT	Notes
SS Argyllshire	1956	9,299	1960 transferred to Scottish Shire Line. 1975 sold to Gulf East Marine Ltd and renamed Schivago; 1977 scrapped at Gadani Beach, Pakistan.
SS Ayrshire	1956	9,360	1960 transferred to Scottish Shire Line. 1965 wrecked off Socotra.
SS Clan Allen	1942	7,043	ex-Empire Forest 1946 purchased from MOWT, renamed Clan Allen; 1958 transferred to Bullard King & Co., renamed Umtali; 1959 reverted to Clan Allen; 1961 sold to Hong Kong, renamed Ardsirod
SS Clan Alpine	1878	2,112	1899 sold to Dene Steam Shipping Co, Newcastle, renamed Elmdene
SS Clan Alpine	1899	3,587	1917 torpedoed and sunk off Shetland Islands by U-60, with the loss of 8 lives
SS Clan Alpine	1918	5,485	13 March 1943 sunk by escort ship HMS Scarborough after being torpedoed by German submarine U-107 off Cape Finisterre; loss of 28 lives
SS Clan Alpine	1942	7,103	ex-Empire Barrie 1945 purchased from MOWT, renamed Clan Alpine; 1957 transferred to Bullard King & Co., renamed Umvoti; 1959 reverted to Clan Alpine, 1960 scrapped
MV Clan Alpine	1967	8,713	1981 sold to Liberia, renamed African Diamond
SS Clan Angus	1942	7,030	ex-Empire Prince 1945 purchased from MOWT, renamed Clan Angus; 1956 transferred to Bullard King & Co., renamed Umkuzi; 1959 reverted to Clan Angus; 1962 scrapped
SS Clan Brodie	1940	7,473	Completed for Admiralty as HMS Athene 1946 returned to Clan Line, renamed Clan Brodie; 1963 scrapped
SS Clan Buchanan	1882	2,968	1904 sold to Bombay owners, renamed Shah Allum
SS Clan Buchanan	1907	5,212	1933 scrapped
SS Clan Buchanan	1937	7,266	1941 sunk by German raider Pinguin off the Maldives after the crew had been taken prisoner, with the loss of 91 lives. 10 days later when HMS Cornwall intercepted and sank Pinguin, 107 Clan Buchanan crew members were killed.
SS Clan Buchanan	1941	9,909	Completed for Admiralty as HMS Engadine 1946 returned to Clan Line, renamed Clan Buchanan; 1962 scrapped
SS Clan Cameron	1882	2,448	1900 sold to Trinidad Shipping & Trading Co, Glasgow, renamed Maraval
SS Clan Cameron	1900	3,595	1917 torpedoed and sunk by UB-58 off Portland Bill; no loss of life
SS Clan Cameron	1937	7,243	1959 scrapped
SS Clan Campbell	1882	2,434	22 September 1882 She ran aground and was wrecked at Baie du Cap, Mauritius
SS Clan Campbell	1894	2,615	1914 sold to AdelaideSS Co., renamed Camira
SS Clan Campbell	1914	5,988	1916 torpedoed, shelled and sunk off Tunisia
SS Clan Campbell	1937	7,255	23 March 1942 bombed by Italian naval aircraft and sunk off Malta, with the loss of 7 lives
SS Clan Campbell	1943	9,545	1961 transferred to King Line and scrapped
SS Clan Chattan	1902	3,938	1930 scrapped
SS Clan Chattan	1937	7,262	14 February 1942 bombed and caught fire while part of convoy MW 9A. She was eventually sunk by Convoy Escort off Crete. All 358 crew were saved.
SS Clan Chattan	1943	9,585	1962 transferred to King Line and scrapped
SS Clan Chisholm	1896	2,647	1925 sold to Japan, renamed Fukko Maru
SS Clan Chisholm	1937	7,256	17 October 1939 torpedoed and sunk by U-48 off Cape Finisterre, with the loss of 4 lives
SS Clan Chisholm	1944	9,581	1962 transferred to King Line and scrapped
SS Clan Colquhoun	1899	5,856	1925 sold to Italy, renamed Nasco
SS Clan Colquhoun	1918	7,912	ex-Gallic 1933 purchased from White Star Line, renamed Clan Colquhoun; 1947 sold to Panama, renamed Ioannis Livanos
SS Clan Cumming	1899	4,808	1917 torpedoed and damaged by UB-55 20 nautical miles (37 km) SW of Lizard Point 1925 sold to Italy, renamed Ettore
SS Clan Cumming	1937	7,264	14 April 1941 she struck a mine and sunk off the Greek island of Aegina
SS Clan Cumming	1946	7,812	1962 scrapped
SS Clan Davidson	1911	5,058	1917 torpedoed and sunk off Scilly Isles by UC-17 (48°16′N 08°36′W); loss of 14 lives
SS Clan Davidson	1943	8,067	Completed for Admiralty as HMS Bonaventure 1948 returned to Clan Line, renamed Clan Davidson; 1961 scrapped
SS Clan Drummond	1882	2,922	1898 foundered in heavy weather in Bay of Biscay, with the loss of 37 lives
SS Clan Farquhar	1899	5,858	1917 torpedoed and sunk off Benghazi by UB-43, with the loss of 49 lives
SS Clan Farquhar	1918	8,006	ex-Delphic 1933 purchased from White Star Line, renamed Clan Farquhar; 1948 scrapped
MV Clan Farquharson	1962	9,292	1968 sold to Iran, renamed Arya Sep
SS Clan Ferguson	1898	4,808	1917 torpedoed and sunk by UB-49 15 nautical miles (28 km) NW of Cap Spartel, Morocco (35°50′N 06°10′W); loss of 10 lives
SS Clan Ferguson	1938	7,347	12 August 1942 both bombed by German Ju 88 aircraft and torpedoed by the Italian submarine Alagi, sank 20 nautical miles (37 km) N of Zembra Island. She was taking part in Operation Pedestal.
MV Clan Fergusson	1961	9,242	1965 sold to Scindia Steam Navigation Company, Bombay, renamed Jalapankhi
MV Clan Finlay	1962	9,292	1968 sold to Iran, renamed Arya Far
SS Clan Forbes	1882	2,461	1903 sold to Furness, Withy & Co., renamed London City (3)
SS Clan Forbes	1903	3,946	1918 torpedoed and sunk in Mediterranean by UB-103 (31°55′N 27°50′E), with the loss of 2 lives
SS Clan Forbes	1938	7,529	1959 scrapped
MV Clan Forbes	1961	9,292	1968 sold to Iran, renamed Arya Man
SS Clan Fraser	1878	2,092	1895 sold to Dene Steamship Co, Newcastle-upon-Tyne, renamed Oakdene
SS Clan Fraser	1900	3,588	1919 sold to Greece, renamed Aghia Paraskevi
SS Clan Fraser	1938	7,529	1941 bombed at Piraeus while unloading ammunition and exploded
MV Clan Fraser	1961	9,292	1965 sold to Scindia Steam Navigation Company, Bombay, renamed Jalapalaka
SS Clan Gordon	1879	2,091	1897 wrecked Mozambique
SS Clan Gordon	1900	3,589	1919 capsized and sank off Cape Hatteras, with no loss of life
SS Clan Graham	1882	2,926	1905 sold to Bombay & Persia Steam Navigation Company, renamed Majdi
SS Clan Graham	1907	5,213	1918 Badly damaged in an attack by German submarine UC-74 15 nautical miles (28 km) SSE of Cape Sidero 1921 sold for scrap after collision and fire in River Scheldt
SS Clan Graham	1912	5,785	ex-Cambrian Princess 1929 purchased from William Thomas Shipping Company, Cardiff, renamed Clan Graham; 1935 transferred to Houston Line; 1938 sold to Neil & Pandelis, London, renamed Maritima
MV Clan Graham	1962	9,308	1971 transferred to King Line 1977 reverted to Clan Line; 1981 sold to Panama, renamed Candelaria
SS Clan Grant	1883	3,580	1900 sold to Russia and became whaling supply ship Michail
SS Clan Grant	1902	3,948	16 October 1914 captured and sunk by German raider Emden off the Maldives
SS Clan Grant	1912	5,817	ex-Cambrian Marchioness 1929 purchased from R.J. Thomas, Cardiff, renamed Clan Grant; 1935 transferred to Houston Line; 1939 sold to Stanhope Shipping Co., London, renamed Stangrant
MV Clan Grant	1962	9,322	1971 transferred to King Line 1977 reverted to Clan Line; 1981 sold to Panama, renamed Enriqueta
SS Clan Keith	1914	4,306	ex-Etonian 1918 purchased from Cambrian Steam Navigation Company, renamed Clan Keith; 1920 transferred to Houston Line, renamed Hilarius; 1924 reverted to Clan Line renamed Clan Keith; 1937 sold to Minster Steamship Company, London, renamed Orminster
SS Clan Keith	1942	7,129	ex-Ocean Verity 1948 purchased from MOWT, renamed Clan Keith; 1961 exploded and sank off Tunisia, with the loss of 62 lives
SS Clan Kennedy	1907	5,086	ex-Ardgaroch 1918 purchased from Lang & Fulton, Greenock, renamed Clan Kennedy; 1924 grounded off Suffolk, total loss
SS Clan Kennedy	1942	7,143	ex-Ocean Viscount 1948 purchased from MOWT, renamed Clan Kennedy; 1959 sold to China, renamed Kelly
SS Clan Kenneth	1909	5,100	ex-Ardgryfe 1918 purchased from Lang & Fulton, Greenock, renamed Clan Kenneth; 1934 scrapped
SS Clan Kenneth	1942	7,132	ex-Ocean Viceroy 1948 purchased from MOWT, renamed Clan Kenneth; 1958 sold to Greece, renamed Omonia II
SS Clan Lamont	1879	2,091	3 May 1891 wrecked Vindiloas Point, Batticaloa, Ceylon
SS Clan Lamont	1900	3,594	1928 scrapped
SS Clan Lamont	1939	7,673	1940–48 used by Admiralty as Landing ship and later as troop ferry 1948 returned to Clan Line. 1961 scrapped.
SS Clan Leslie	1902	3,973	1916 torpedoed and sunk by UB-43 200 nautical miles (370 km) E of Malta (33°56′N 18°37′E), with the loss of 3 lives
SS Clan Lindsay	1896	2,668	1898 wrecked Cape Colony
SS Clan Lindsay	1902	3,935	1931 scrapped
SS Clan Macalister	1891	2,265	1902 sold to Furness Withy, renamed Loyalist
SS Clan Macalister	1903	4,835	1916 torpedoed and sunk by U-35 120 nautical miles (220 km) SxE of Cape Martello, Crete. There was no loss of life
SS Clan Macalister	1930	6,787	29 May 1940 bombed and sunk during Dunkirk evacuation with the loss of 12 lives
SS Clan Macarthur	1883	3,984	1904 sold to Shah Steam Navigation Company, India, renamed Shah Jehan
SS Clan Macarthur	1912	7,382	1920 transferred to Scottish Shire Line, renamed Berwickshire 20 August 1944 torpedoed and sunk 200 nautical miles (370 km) E of Durban by U-861, with the loss of 8 lives
SS Clan Macarthur	1936	10,528	12 August 1943 torpedoed and sunk by U-181 E of Madagascar, with the loss of 53 lives
SS Clan Macaulay	1899	2,834	1929 scrapped
SS Clan Macaulay	1936	10,492	1961 transferred to Houston Line 1963 scrapped
SS Clan MacBean	1917	5,052	1947 sold to Goulandris Brothers, renamed Korthion
SS Clan MacBean	1942	7,129	ex-Ocean Courier 1948 purchased from MOWT, renamed Clan Macbean; 1960 scrapped
SS Clan MacBeolan	1912	4,652	ex-Lord Cromer 1918 purchased from J. Herron, Liverpool, renamed Clan Macbeolan; 1920 transferred to Houston Line, renamed Halesius; 1936 sold to Greece, renamed Avra
SS Clan Macbeth	1913	4,650	1937 sold to Nailsea Steamship Company, Cardiff, renamed Nailsea Vale
SS Clan Macbeth	1942	7,130	ex-Ocean Glory 1948 purchased from MOWT, renamed Clan Macbeth; 1959 sold to Hong Kong, renamed Madonna
SS Clan Macbrayne	1916	4,818	1943 transferred to Houston Line 1948 sold to Panama, renamed San Georgio
SS Clan Macbrayne	1942	7,129	ex-Ocean Messenger 1948 purchased from MOWT, renamed Clan Macbrayne; 1960 transferred to King Line; 1961 scrapped
SS Clan Macbride	1912	4,886	1937 sold to McGowan & Gross, renamed Heathcot
SS Clan Macbride	1942	7,128	ex-Ocean Gypsy; 1948 purchased from MOWT, renamed Clan Macbride 1958 sold to Hong Kong, renamed Alice
SS Clan Maccorquodale	1913	5,121	1917 torpedoed and sunk by UB-51 in Mediterranean 165 nautical miles (306 km) NWxN of Alexandria
SS Clan Macdonald	1882	2,642	1897 sold to Dene Steamship Company, Newcastle-upon-Tyne, renamed Briardene
SS Clan Macdonald	1897	4,839	1922 sold to Japan, renamed Hokuyo Maru
MV Clan Macdonald	1928	6,022	1929 transferred to Scottish Shire Line, renamed Stirlingshire 2 December 1940 She was part of Convoy HX 90 when she was torpedoed and sunk in Atlantic (55°36′N 16°22′W) by U-94, with no loss of life
MV Clan Macdonald	1939	9,653	1960 transferred to Houston Line 1970 scrapped
SS Clan MacDougall	1904	4,710	1918 torpedoed and sunk by UB-49 off Sardinia, with the loss of 33 lives
MV Clan MacDougall	1929	6,843	31 May 1941 torpedoed and sunk by U-106 near Cape Verde Islands, with the loss of 2 lives
MV Clan MacDougall	1943	9,710	1960 transferred to Houston Line 1971 sold to Cyprus renamed Vyrsi
SS Clan Macduff	1870	2,319	ex-City of Oxford 1881 purchased from George Smith & Sons, renamed Clan Macduff; 1881 sank in bad weather off Ireland, with the loss of 32 lives
SS Clan Macewen	1912	5,140	1920 transferred to Scottish Shire Line, renamed Buteshire 1932 transferred to Houston Line; 1948 scrapped
SS Clan Macfadyen	1899	2,816	1921 sold to Japan, renamed Shunka Maru
SS Clan Macfadyen	1923	6,224	27 November 1942 The unescorted vessel was torpedoed and sunk by U-508 east of Trinidad, with the loss of 82 lives
SS Clan Macfadyen	1944		ex Samderwent, Managed for MOWT 1947 renamed Clan Macfadyen; 1958 sold to Greece, renamed Betavista
SS Clan Macfarlane	1898	4,823	1915 torpedoed and sunk by U-38 off Crete, with the loss of 52 lives
SS Clan Macfarlane	1922	6,222	1940 sank after collision in Red Sea, with the loss of 41 lives
SS Clan Macfarlane	1943	7,176	ex Sambrian. Managed for MOWT 1947 renamed Clan Macfarlane; 1961 sold to Lebanon, renamed Nicholas
SS Clan Macgillivray	1911	5,023	1948 sold to Hong Kong, renamed Maclock
MV Clan Macgillivray	1962	9,039	1969 transferred to King Line 1981 sold to Hong Kong renamed Clan Macboyd
MV Clan MacGowan	1962	9,039	1969 transferred to King Line 1970 sold to India SS Co., renamed Indian Tribune
SS Clan MacGregor	1882	3,003	1899 sunk in collision off Portugal
SS Clan Macgregor	1901	4,511	1 June 1902 She ran aground and was wrecked at Atlas Reef, South Africa on her maiden voyage
MV Clan MacGregor	1962	9,039	1969 transferred to King Line 1977 reverted to Clan Line; 1982 sold to Greece, renamed Angelika R
SS Clan Macilwraith	1924	4,958	1950 sold to F. Vinnen, Bremen, renamed Magdalene Vinnen
MV Clan Macilwraith	1960	7,419	1979 sold to Singapore, renamed Golden City
SS Clan Macindoe	1920	4,635	1943 burnt out at Alexandria
MV Clan Macindoe	1959	7,395	1979 sold to Gulf Shipping Lines, renamed Gulf Heron
SS Clan Macinnes	1907	3,755	ex-Roanoke 1907 purchased from Chesapeake & Ohio Steamship Company, renamed Clan Macinnes; 1914 sold to Furness Withy, reverted to Roanoke
SS Clan MacInnes	1920	4,672	1947 sold to Noemijulia Steamship Company, London, renamed San George
MV Clan MacInnes	1952	6,559	1978 sold to Lebanon, renamed Athoub
SS Clan Macintosh	1883	4,053	1905 sold to M. Jebson, Hamburg, renamed Totti
SS Clan Macintosh	1905	4,774	1932 scrapped
MV Clan Macintosh	1951	6,556	1978 sold to Hong Kong, renamed Sanil
SS Clan Macintyre	1891	2,515	1902 sold to Ellerman Lines, renamed Bulgarian
SS Clan Macintyre	1903	4,807	1928 sold to Italy, renamed Norma
MV Clan Macintyre	1951	6,556	1976 sold to Panama, renamed Eastern Express
SS Clan Maciver	1907	3,760	ex-Rapidan 1907 purchased from Chesapeake & Ohio Steamship Company, renamed Clan Maciver; 1914 sold to Furness Withy, reverted to Rapidan
SS Clan Maciver	1921	4,606	1951 sold to Costa Rica, renamed Carrena
MV Clan Maciver	1958	7,413	1979 sold to Panama, renamed Trinity Pride
SS Clan Mackay	1882	2,171	1891 wrecked Ceylon
SS Clan Mackay	1894	2,600	1913 sold to Adelaide Steamship Company, renamed Ceduna 1924 Tung Duck; 1937 Chang Teh; 1937 Pananis; 1941 Shinyo Maru
SS Clan Mackay	1916	5,040	1918 sank after collision SW of the Scilly Isles
SS Clan Mackay	1913	5,182	ex-Sudmark, Hamburg America Line 1914 captured by Royal Navy, renamed Huntscraft; 1919 purchased from Shipping Controller; 1921 renamed Clan Mackay; 19 October 1934 she ran aground and was wrecked near Sierra Leone at 8°30′N 13°18′W
SS Clan Mackay	1945	7,389	ex-Empire Gunfleet 1946 purchased from MOWT, renamed Clan Mackay; 1962 sold to Panama, renamed Babylon
SS Clan Mackellar	1912	6,382	1937 sold to McGowan & Gross, renamed Moorcot
SS Clan Mackellar	1944	7,051	ex-Empire Lankester 1948 purchased from MOWT, renamed Clan Mackellar; 1961 sold to Hong Kong, renamed Ardgroom
SS Clan Mackendrick	1943		ex-Empire Pickwick 1948 purchased from MOWT, renamed Clan Mackendrick; 1961 sold to Hong Kong, renamed Ardpatrick
SS Clan Mackenzie	1882	2,987	1904 sold to Shah Steam Navigation Company, India, renamed Shah Ameer
SS Clan Mackenzie	1911	5,018	1912 She was wrecked when she ran aground near Torre Nueva, near Cadiz
SS Clan Mackenzie	1917	6,544	1918 torpedoed and damaged by German submarine UB-30 S of the Isle of Wight 1937 beached after collision in Liverpool Bay, total loss
SS Clan Mackenzie	1942	7,025	ex-Empire Cato 1947 purchased from MOWT, renamed Clan Mackenzie, 1960 scrapped
SS Clan Mackinlay	1918	6,418	6 November 1940 She was bombed by a German He 115 seaplane and sunk off Noss, Scotland, with the loss of 5 lives
SS Clan Mackinlay	1945	7,392	ex-Empire Fawley 1946 purchased from MOWT, renamed Clan Mackinlay, 1962 scrapped
SS Clan Mackinnon	1891	2,268	1902 sold to Furness Withy, renamed Evangeline
SS Clan Mackinnon	1902	4,788	1927 sold to Finland, renamed Herakles
SS Clan Mackinnon	1945	7,373	ex-Empire Dunnet 1946 purchased from MOWT, renamed Clan Mackinnon; 1955 transferred to Houston Line; 1961 sold to Hong Kong, renamed Ardross
SS Clan Maclachlan	1900	4,729	1917 sank following being run down by Italian steamer Europa when 60 nautical miles (110 km) SW of Cape Spartel off Morocco. Both ships were travelling without lights due to wartime. 6 lives were lost
SS Clan Maclachlan	1946	6,365	1971 scrapped
SS Clan Maclaren	1899	2,832	1924 sold to Japan, renamed Muroran Maru
SS Clan Maclaren	1946	6,389	1976 transferred to Houston Line in 1959 1961 reverted to Clan Line; 1976 sold to Seymour Shipping Company, London, renamed Seemor
SS Clan Maclay	1948	6,389	1976 sold to Panama, renamed Climax Amethyst
SS Clan Maclean	1870	2,329	ex-City of Cambridge 1881 purchased from George Smith & Son, renamed Clan Maclean; 13 August 1903 She ran aground and was wrecked in fog on Portuguese coast 6 nautical miles (11 km) N of Cape St. Vincent, with no loss of life
SS Clan Maclean	1905	4,676	1919 wrecked on Comoros Islands, with no loss of life
MV Clan Maclean	1947	6,017	1976 sold to Singapore, renamed Sentosa Island
SS Clan Maclennan	1947	6,366	1971 scrapped
SS Clan Macleod	1871	2,290	ex-City of Mecca 1881 purchased from George Smith & Son, renamed Clan Macleod; 1883 sold to Stephen in part payment for new ship and resold to Sloman Line, Hamburg, renamed Procida
SS Clan Macleod	1891	2,507	1902 sold to Ellerman Lines, renamed Bosnian
SS Clan Macleod	1903	4,796	1915 shelled and sunk by U-33 at position 35°39′N 16°43′E E of Malta, with the loss of 12 lives
MV Clan Macleod	1948	6,073	1976 sold to Cyprus, renamed Papaji
SS Clan Macmaster	1917	6,563	30 September 1923 She was wrecked on Thousla Rock, Calf of Man, on voyage from Clydebank to Liverpool with a general cargo
SS Clan Macmillan	1901	4,525	1917 torpedoed and sunk by UB-39 in English Channel at 50°41′N 00°01′W
SS Clan Macmillan	1918	6,608	1924 wrecked in Bay of Bengal, with no loss of life
SS Clan Macnab	1891	2,266	1903 sold to Furness Withy, renamed St. John City
SS Clan Macnab	1904	4,675	1918 torpedoed and sunk by U-113 off Land's End at 50°20′N 05°55′W, with the loss of 22 lives
SS Clan Macnab	1920	6,114	1941 sank after collision near Cape Verde Islands
MV Clan Macnab	1961	9,428	1980 sold to Panama, renamed New Eagle
SS Clan Macnair	1921	6,094	1952 scrapped
MV Clan Macnair	1962	9,401	1980 sold to Singapore, renamed Lichiang
HMS Clan Macnaughton	1911	4,985	1915 disappeared at sea in the North Atlantic, possibly mined, while she was an Armed Merchant Cruiser, with the loss of 281 lives
SS Clan Macnaughton	1921	6,110	1 August 1942 the unescorted vessel was torpedoed and sunk E of Trinidad by U-155, with the loss of 5 lives
SS Clan Macneil	1891	2,421	1902 sold to Ellerman Lines, renamed Belgravian
SS Clan Macneil	1903	3,939	1918 torpedoed and sunk by UC-34 off Alexandria at 31°21′N 29°47′E
SS Clan Macneil	1921	6,111	1952 scrapped
SS Clan Macphee	1911	5,177	16 August 1940 torpedoed and sunk in Atlantic by U-30, with the loss of 67 lives
SS Clan Macpherson	1883	3,989	1905 sold to M. Jebson, Hamburg, renamed Hanna
SS Clan Macpherson	1905	4,779	1918 torpedoed and sunk by UC-27 off North Africa at 37°47′N 09°05′E, with the loss of 20 lives
SS Clan Macpherson	1929	6,940	1 May 1943 torpedoed and sunk by U-515 off Freetown, with the loss of 4 lives
SS Clan Macquarrie	1913	5,060	13 June 1942 sunk by Leonardo da Vinci at 05°30′N 23°30′W west of Freetown
SS Clan Macquarrie	1942	7,131	ex-Ocean Wayfarer 1948 purchased from MOWT, renamed Clan Macquarrie; 1953 scrapped after going aground in a storm on the Isle of Lewis, Scotland at the village of Borve. 66 crew were rescued by villagers
SS Clan Macqueen	1942	7,131	ex-Ocean Vesper 1948 purchased from MOWT, renamed Clan Macqueen; 1954 transferred to Houston Line, renamed Herminius; 1958 sold to Panama, renamed Ekberg
SS Clan Macrae	1892	2,510	ex-Shatt el Arab 1894 taken over with Persian Gulf Steamship Company, renamed Clan Macrae; 1900 sold to Chadwick Steamship Company, renamed Carmelite
SS Clan Macrae	1911	5,058	1921 transferred to Scottish Shire Line, renamed Banffshire 1932 transferred to Houston Line; 29 September 1943 torpedoed and sunk off Maldives by U-532. Only 1 crew member was killed
SS Clan Macrae	1942	9,209	ex-Empire Might 1946 purchased from Ministry of War Transport, renamed Clan Macrae; 1959 transferred to Bullard King & Co., renamed Umgeni; 1960 transferred to Springbok Line, renamed Gembok; 1961 transferred to Safmarine, renamed South African Financier; 1962 scrapped
SS Clan Mactaggart	1920	7,603	1935 transferred to Scottish Shire Line 16 November 1942 torpedoed and sunk by U-92 NW of Gibraltar, with the loss of 3 lives
SS Clan Mactaggart	1949	8,035	1971 scrapped
SS Clan Mactavish	1912	7,385	1916 shelled and sunk by German raider SMS Möwe off Madeira, with the loss of 18 lives
SS Clan Mactavish	1920	7,619	8 October 1942 torpedoed and sunk by U-159 in Indian Ocean, with the loss of 61 lives
SS Clan MacTavish	1949	8,035	1971 scrapped
SS Clan Macvey	1918	5,830	1918 torpedoed and sunk in English Channel on maiden voyage by UB-57
SS Clan MacVicar	1918	5,815	1936 sold to Counties Ship Management, London, renamed Dover Hill On 9 June 1944 during the Normandy landings she was scuttled off Sword Beach as a Corncob block ship for a Gooseberry Harbour.
SS Clan Macwhirter	1918	7,062	ex-Ypresville 1919 purchased from Lloyd Royal Belge by Houston Line, renamed Halizones; 1920 sold to Convoy Steamship Company, Liverpool, renamed Willcasino; 1922 reverted to Houston Line; 1923 transferred to Clan Line, renamed Clan Macwhirter; 27 August 1942 torpedoed and sunk by U-156 N of Madeira (35°45′N 18°45′W), with the loss of 10 lives
SS Clan Macwilliam	1918	7,234	1927 burnt out at Vavau, Friendly Islands
SS Clan Malcolm	1916	5,994	26 September 1935 She struck Tregwin Rocks in thick fog and was wrecked near Lizard Point
MV Clan Malcolm	1957	7,686	1979 sold to Panama, renamed Trinity Fair
SS Clan Matheson	1883	3,917	1905 sold to M. Jebson, Hamburg, renamed Mariechen
SS Clan Matheson	1905	4,775	14 September 1914 captured and sunk by German raider Emden in the Bay of Bengal
SS Clan Matheson	1917	5,960	1918 sank after collision in mid Atlantic
SS Clan Matheson	1919	5,613	1948 transferred to Houston Line, renamed Harmodius 1951 sold to Heron Steamship Co, London, renamed Claire T 1953 sold to Romney Steamship Co. 1955 sold to Ministry of Transport; Scuttled on 27 July 1955 as part of Operation Sandcastle
MV Clan Matheson	1957	7,585	1978 scrapped
SS Clan Menzies	1896	2,669	1925 sold to A. Ardito, Genoa, renamed Nostra Signora di Coronata
SS Clan Menzies	1938	7,556	27 July 1940 torpedoed and sunk off Ireland by U-99 with the loss of 6 lives
MV Clan Menzies	1958	8,000	1979 sold to Panama, renamed Trinity Splendour
SS Clan Monroe	1881	2,197	1897 sold to Dene Steamship Co, Newcastle-upon-Tyne, renamed Cedardene
SS Clan Monroe	1897	4,853	1905 wrecked near Cape Town
SS Clan Monroe	1918	5,919	1940 she struck mine off Harwich whilst acting as auxiliary transport. She was taken in tow and beached in Hollesley Bay. She was declared a total loss, with the loss of 13 lives
SS Clan Morrison	1918	5,931	24 February 1940 She struck a mine en route from Southampton to Blyth, Northumberland and sank in the North Sea
SS Clan Murdoch	1919	5,930	1948 transferred to Houston Line, renamed Halesius 1952 sold to Panama, renamed Jan Kiki
SS Clan Murdoch	1946	7,375	Completed as Hesperia for Houston Line 1960 transferred to Clan Line, renamed Clan Murdoch; 1962 sold to Turkey, renamed Mustafa
SS Clan Murray	1881	2,108	ex-Muriel 1882 purchased from W. Ritchie, Aberdeen, renamed Clan Murray; 1897 sold to Dene Steamship Co, Newcastle-upon-Tyne, renamed Olivedene
SS Clan Murray	1897	4,835	1917 torpedoed and sunk by UC-55 off Fastnet (50°57′N 10°21′W), with the loss of 64 lives
SS Clan Murray	1918	5,926	1949 transferred to Houston Line, renamed Halizones 1952 scrapped
SS Clan Murray	1946	7,301	Completed as Hesperides for Houston Line 1960 transferred to Clan Line, renamed Clan Murray; 1960 scrapped
SS Clan Ogilvie	1882	2,425	Wrecked off Corsica, 7 January 1888.
SS Clan Ogilvy	1896	2,641	1913 sold to Japan, renamed Taiyo Maru
SS Clan Ogilvy	1914	5,802	1938 transferred to Houston Line 30 June 1940 As part of Convoy SL-36, she was attacked and damaged by U-65. She was repaired and returned to service in October 1940; 21 March 1941 torpedoed and sunk NW of Dakar by U-105 at 20°04′N 25°45′W, with the loss of 36 lives
MV Clan Ramsay	1965	10,542	1977 transferred to Union-Castle Line, renamed Winchester Castle
SS Clan Ranald	1878	2,048	1899 sold to Ranald Steamship Co, Glasgow, renamed Ranald
SS Clan Ranald	1900	3,596	1909 capsized and sank off the SE coast of Yorke Peninsula, South Australia
SS Clan Ranald	1917	5,503	1943 transferred to Houston Line 1947 sold to Malta, renamed Valletta City
MV Clan Ranald	1964	10,541	1976 transferred to Union-Castle Line, renamed Dover Castle
SS Clan Robertson	1897	4,826	1922 sold to Japan, renamed Kyosei Maru
SS Clan Robertson	1919	7,976	ex-Otaki 1934 purchased from New Zealand Shipping Company, renamed Clan Robertson; 1938 sold to Stanhope Shipping Co, London, renamed Stanfleet; Later sold to Blue Star Line and became Pacific Star
SS Clan Robertson	1954	7,878	1959 transferred to Bullard King & Co., renamed Umzinto 1960 transferred to Springbok Line, renamed Rooibok; 1961 transferred to Safmarine, renamed South African Shipper; 1966 renamed S.A.Shipper; 1975 scrapped
MV Clan Robertson	1965	10,541	1976 transferred to Union-Castle Line, renamed Balmoral Castle; 1982 renamed Balmoral Universal; 1982 sold and renamed Psara Reefer 19 Jun 1984 scrapped
SS Clan Ross	1894	2,604	1914 sold to Adelaide Steamship Company, renamed Cantara
SS Clan Ross	1914	5,897	1918 torpedoed and damaged in an attack by UB-48 28 nautical miles (52 km) E of Cape Camerat, France 1938 transferred to Houston Line; 2 April 1942 torpedoed and sunk by Japanese submarine I-6 300 nautical miles (560 km) SW of Bombay, with the loss of 11 lives. She was en route from Liverpool to Cochin
SS Clan Ross	1956	7,698	1960 transferred to Houston Line 1961 transferred to Safmarine, renamed South African Scientist; 1962 transferred to Union-Castle Line, renamed Kinnaird Castle
MV Clan Ross	1966	10,542	1976 transferred to Union-Castle Line, renamed Kinpurnie Castle
SS Clan Shaw	1896	3,442	ex-Imperialist 1896 purchased from Angier Bros, London, renamed Clan Shaw; 1898 sold to F & W. Ritson, Sunderland, renamed Vine Branch
SS Clan Shaw	1902	3,943	1917 mined by UC-29. She was beached and declared a total loss 8 nautical miles (15 km) NE of St.Andrews, near Dundee, with the loss of 2 lives
SS Clan Shaw	1950	8,101	1960 transferred to Springbok Line, renamed Steenbok 1961 transferred to Safmarine, renamed South African Seafarer; 1966 wrecked Cape Town
SS Clan Sinclair	1882	2,961	1905 sold to Bombay & Persia SN Co., renamed Rahmani
SS Clan Sinclair	1907	5,215	1933 scrapped
SS Clan Sinclair	1950	8,386	1960 transferred to Springbok Line, renamed Bosbok 1961 transferred to Safmarine, renamed South African Statesman; 1966 renamed S.A.Statesman; 1972 scrapped
SS Clan Skene	1918	5,257	1920 transferred to Houston Line, renamed Halocrates 1923 reverted to Clan Skene; 10 May 1940 torpedoed and sunk in Atlantic by U-333, with the loss of 9 lives
SS Clan Stewart	1954	8,163	1961 transferred to Safmarine, renamed South African Sculptor 1962 transferred to Union-Castle Line, renamed Kinpurnie Castle
SS Clan Stuart	1879	2,115	1900 sold to India, renamed Rander Reunion
SS Clan Stuart'	1900	3,594	21 November 1914 She ran aground and was wrecked after her anchors dragged in a SE storm at Simons Bay, South Africa on Government Transport work. All crew survived, but the ship was a total loss.
SS Clan Stuart	1916	5,755	1940 sank after collision off Start Point
SS Clan Sutherland	1896	2,820	17 April 1917 She was torpedoed and damaged by UC-66 18 nautical miles (33 km) SE of Start Point 1921 sold to Japan, renamed Shinshu Maru
SS Clan Sutherland	1950	8,436	1971 sold to China National Machinery Import & Export Corp, China and arrived 10 November 1971 at Hsinkang for scrapping
SS Clan Urquhart	1899	5,855	1929 sold to Retzlaff, Rostock, renamed Generaldirektor Sonnenschein
SS Clan Urquhart	1911	9,564	formerly Argyllshire 1917 taken with Scottish Shire Line; 1930 sold to Federal Steam; 1933 bought by Clan Line, renamed Clan Urquhart; 1936 scrapped
SS Clan Urquhart	1943	9,726	1960 transferred to Houston Line 1966 scrapped

== Legacy ==
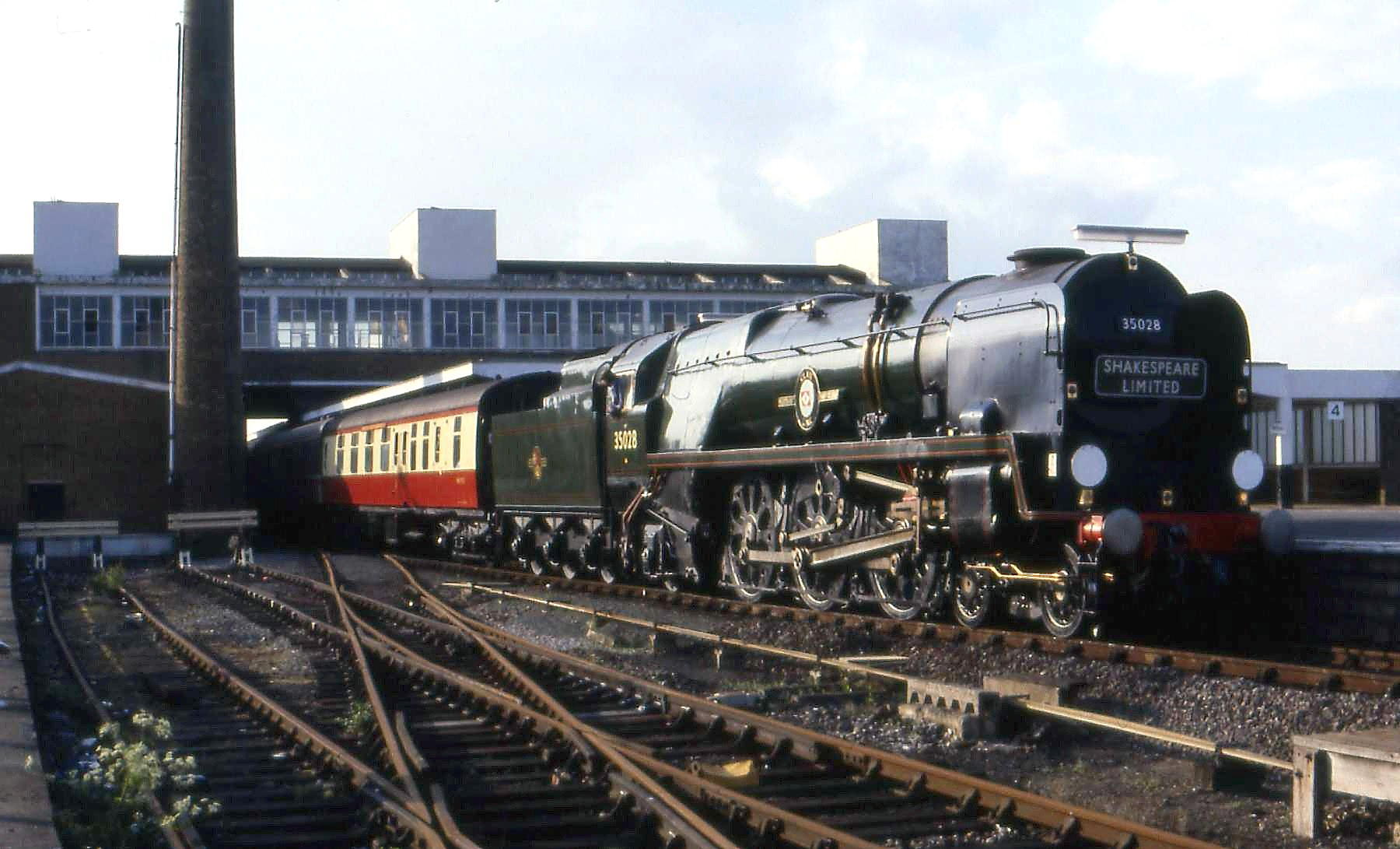
35028 Clan Line

It was one of the shipping companies commemorated by the Merchant Navy class of Southern Railway locomotives. Locomotive number 35028 built in 1948 carries the name "Clan Line" and is currently maintained in fully operational condition for hauling excursion trains on the UK's national railway system.

== House flags ==
House flag until the 1910s.

House flag used from 1910s to the end of the company's existence.

Commodore's flag used to distinguish the Flagship.

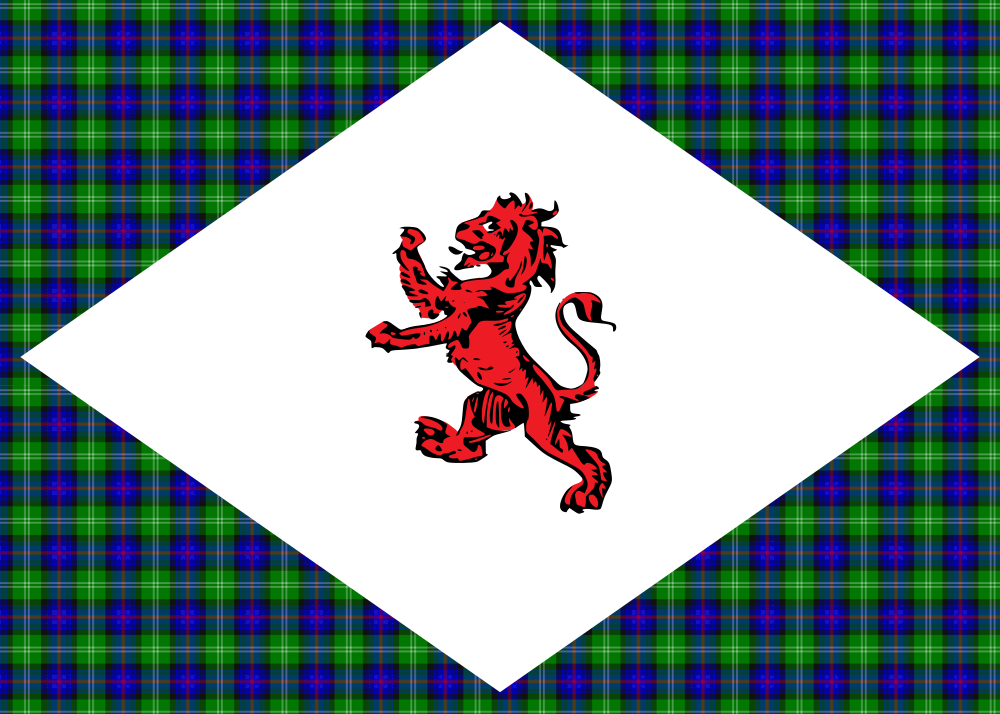
Flag of Clan Sutherland (1951), preserved in Royal Museums Greenwich.

Clan Line company used on its ships a general flag with a red lion on a white rhombus on a red background and second flag with a rhombus and lion on tartan belonging to the clan after which the ship was named. Tartan flags were used until the mid-1960s and were flown at the bow.

== See also ==
- Loch Line
- Caledonia Investments

== Sources ==
- Bax, John. "Clan Line". Merchant Navy Officers. Archived from the original on 3 May 2009.
- Swiggum, Susan; Kohli, Marjorie (6 March 2007). "C.W. Cayzer & Company / Cayzer, Irvine & Company / Clan Line of Steamers Limited / Clan Line". TheShipsList.
- "House flag, Clan Line Steamers Ltd". National Maritime Museum.
- Coombe, Ian. "Clan Line". Merchant Navy Nostalgia.
