= Operation Collar (convoy) =

1940 three-ship convoy

- Part of the Battle of the Mediterranean of the Second World War
- Relief map of Italy and the surrounding area
Location	Mediterranean Sea
Result	British victory

Belligerents
United Kingdom	Kingdom of Italy

Commanders and leaders
Andrew Cunningham; James Somerville; Lancelot Holland	Inigo Campioni

Units involved
Mediterranean Fleet; Force H; Fleet Air Arm; Royal Air Force	Regia Aeronautica; Regia Marina

Strength
3 freighters and escorts	4 Torpedo boats; c. 10 MAS boats

Casualties and losses
None	None

Operation Collar (12–29 November 1940) was a small, fast three-ship convoy sent from Britain during the Second World War on 12 November 1940. The three ships and their cruiser escorts passed the Strait of Gibraltar on 24 November. Two of the merchant ships were bound for Malta and one for Alexandria with military supplies. Numerous other operations were conducted by Force H, based at Gibraltar and by the Mediterranean Fleet at Alexandria in Egypt.

The Regia Marina (Italian Royal Navy) had not been deterred from challenging the British after the disaster of the Battle of Taranto (11/12 November 1940) that put three of its six battleships out of action. When aware that Force H was sailing eastwards, the Italian fleet sailed to attack the British ships, leading to the inconclusive Battle of Cape Spartivento (Battle of Cape Teluada to the Italians) on 27 November. The two Malta-bound ships arrived on 26 November.

As the British and Italian battle fleets manoeuvred inconclusively, Force F made off towards the Sicilian Narrows with the anti-aircraft cruiser HMS Coventry from Force D. the two freighters bound for Malta made port on 29 November. New Zealand Star continued to Alexandria with the cruisers HMS Manchester and HMS Southampton and the destroyers HMS Defender and HMS Hereward.

After the Battle of Spartivento there were moves against senior commanders, before Somerville returned to Gibraltar, the Prime Minister, Winston Churchill and the Admiralty had despatched a court of inquiry. Somerville was exonerated but in Italy, Admiral Inigo Campioni was sacked and replaced by Admiral Angelo Iachino. The Mediterranean Fleet resumed operations in the eastern Mediterranean.

== Background ==
=== Malta, 1940 ===
Malta, is a Mediterranean island of 122 sq mi (320 km^{2}) in an archipelago that has two other inhabited islands, Gozo and Comino. Malta had been a British colony since 1814. By the 1940s, the island had a population of 275,000 but local farmers could feed only one-third of the population, the deficit being made up by imports. Malta was a staging post on the British Suez Canal sea route to India, East Africa, the oilfields of Iraq and Iran, India and the Far East. The island was also close to the Sicilian Channel between Sicily and Tunis. After the Italian entry into the Second World War (10 June 1940), Malta was used as a base of operations by the Royal Air Force (RAF) and Fleet Air Arm (FAA), sea and submarine operations by the Royal Navy against Axis supply convoys from Italy to Italian Libya. On 11 June 1940, Italy began the Siege of Malta, the first step in an Italian plan to gain control of the Mediterranean. The Italians intended to bomb or starve Malta into submission by attacking its ports, towns, cities, and Allied shipping supplying the island.

=== Force H ===
At the west end of the Mediterranean, Vice-Admiral Sir James Somerville, the commander of Force H was less optimistic. Force H was smaller than the Mediterranean Fleet, having been improvised at Gibraltar as a substitute for the French Marine Nationale after France defected from the Allies in late June. The redeployment of much of the Regia Marina to the west coast of Italy added to the vulnerability of Force H. The battleship HMS Renown was the only operational battleship, HMS Royal Sovereign being in dry-dock for engine and boiler repairs, leaving Force H outnumbered three to one in battleships. The aircraft carrier HMS Ark Royal was part of the force but the poor showing of the torpedo-bombers against Strasbourg left Somerville doubtful over the lack of training and inexperience of the aircrew in attacks on moving ships, shown again in operations during the Battle of Calabria (9 July 1940).

Force H had two 6-inch cruisers, the modern HMS Sheffield and the ageing Danae-class cruiser HMS Despatch, completed in 1922. HMS Manchester and Southampton were to participate in the operation but carrying 1,370 RAF technicians would severely limit their ability to fight. (Note: Vice-Admiral Lancelot Holland, the commander of the 18th Cruiser Squadron, wrote that it would be better for the two cruisers to make independent passage to Alexandria, relying on speed and manoeuvrability since carrying about 700 extra men each meant that battle damage could cause severe casualties amongst the passengers.) The 8th Destroyer Flotilla comprised HMS Faulknor, Firedrake, Forester, Fury with HMS Duncan and Wishart of the 13th Destroyer Flotilla and the new arrivals HMS Jaguar and Kelvin that brought Force H up to eight destroyers, the equivalent of one destroyer flotilla. HMS Hotspur was also at Gibraltar but was of limited value after ramming the Italian submarine Lafolè in late October, losing its Asdic, having to run at a slower speed and needing to get to the dockyard in Malta for repairs. Four Flower-class corvettes, HMS Peony, Salvia, Gloxinia and Hyacinth were waiting to sail to Alexandria and carried anti-magnetic mine apparatus, limiting their speed to 16 kn (30 km/h; 18 mph) in theory, that turned out to be 14 kn (26 km/h; 16 mph) in practice.

== Force H plan ==
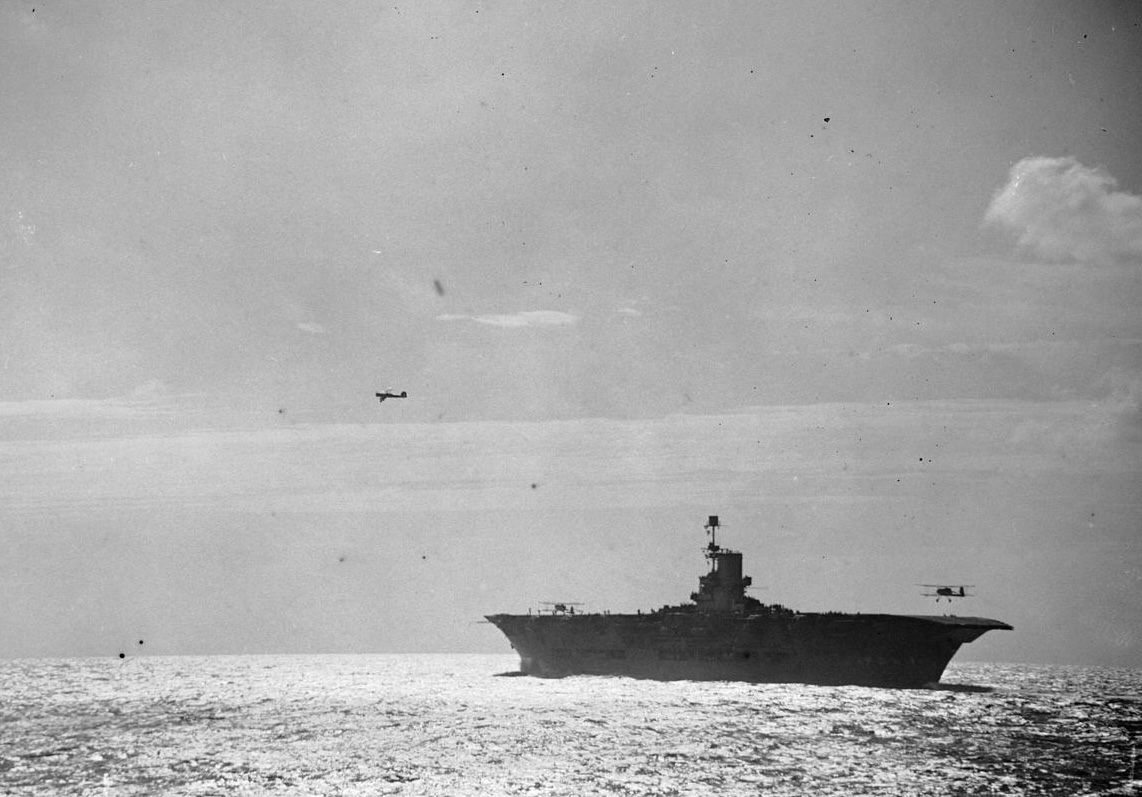
HMS Ark Royal aircraft landing, 27 November

Force H was to make an air attack on Alghero airfield in the north-west of Sardinia, transport 1,400 soldiers and naval personnel through the Mediterranean from Gibraltar to Malta in the cruisers Manchester and Southampton that would meet Force D of the Mediterranean Fleet. The cruisers were to be part of the escort to Malta for the fast [15 kn (28 km/h; 17 mph)] merchant ships Clan Forbes and Clan Fraser to Malta and New Zealand Star to Alexandria. On 15 November the ships and the destroyers Vidette, Velox and Wrestler sailed from the Clyde in Scotland for Gibraltar. Once the convoy entered the Mediterranean, it would be joined by the damaged Hotspur due for repairs at Malta. The corvettes Gloxinia, Hyacinth, Peony and Salvia were also to join the convoy, en route to Alexandria to join the Mediterranean Fleet. Somerville intended to join Force D at midday on 27 November south-east of Sardinia, continue to the Sicilian Narrows then turn for Gibraltar, Collar continuing towards Mata during the night.

== Operation MB 9 ==
=== Mediterranean Fleet ===
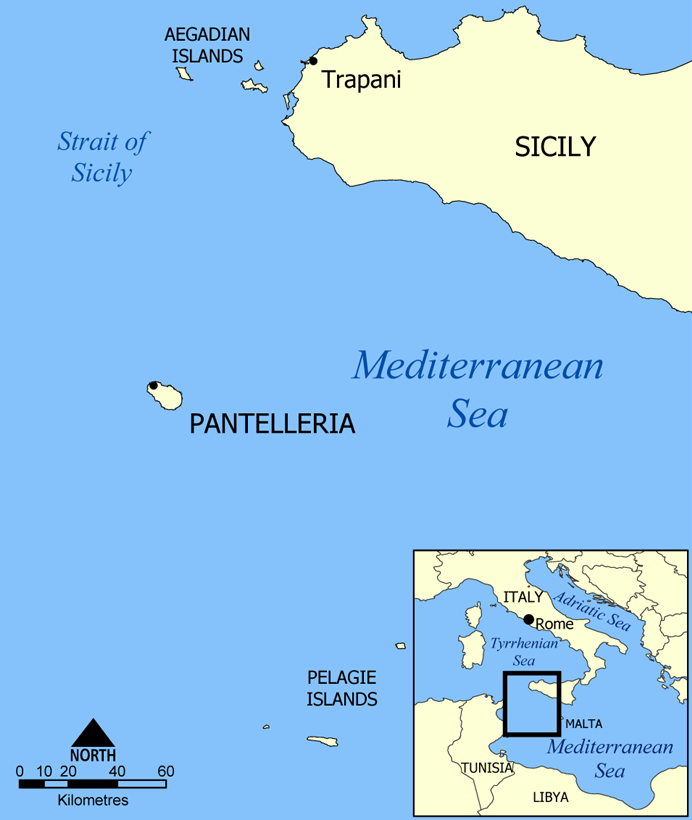
Location map of the island of Pantelleria

On the night of 11/12 November 1940, the Battle of Taranto was fought by aircraft from HMS Illustrious of the Mediterranean Fleet that attacked the Italian Fleet in Taranto harbour and damaged severely the battleships Conte di Cavour, Duilio and Littorio leaving the Regia Marina with only three operational battleships. After the success of the raid, the commander of the Mediterranean Fleet, Admiral Andrew Cunningham, was willing to give credence to some of the more enthusiastic ideas circulating in Whitehall, in London. Operation Workshop, a plan to capture the island of Pantellaria, was rejected because it had no strategic significance and would saddle the navy with another onerous supply obligation. Operation Collar, a proposal to send a convoy of fast merchant ships carrying personnel and supplies from Gibraltar to Malta and Alexandria seemed feasible, with the drastic reduction in the fighting power of the Regia Marina.

=== Force C ===
Force C covered Force D with the battleships Barham and Malaya and the aircraft carrier Eagle, which was to attack Tripoli on 26 November. The Mediterranean Fleet left Alexandria with the battleships HMS Valiant, Warspite and the aircraft carrier Illustrious, the 7th Cruiser Squadron comprising HMS Ajax, Orion and Sydney with destroyers to cover a convoy to Souda Bay in Crete. Aircraft from Illustrious attacked Rhodes on 26 November.

=== Force E ===
Convoy MW 4 of HMS Breconshire, SS Clan Ferguson, SS Clan Macaulay and MV Memnon was to sail from Alexandria to Malta with Force E, a close escort of HMS Hasty, Havock, Hero, Hyperion, Ilex, HMAS Vampire, Vendetta and Voyager. The distant escort consisted of the 3rd Cruiser Squadron, HMS Glasgow, Gloucester and York.

=== Force D ===
Force D, the slow battleship HMS Ramillies, the cruisers HMS Berwick that was suffering from turbine problems and Newcastle that had boiler trouble, were to depart Alexandria for Gibraltar across the Mediterranean, rather than round the Cape of Good Hope. The ships were to be accompanied by the anti-aircraft cruiser Coventry, with the destroyers HMS Defender, Gallant, Greyhound, Griffin and Hereward. Force D was to rendezvous with Operation Collar (Force F) south of Sardinia. Convoy MW 4, the merchant ships Memnon, Clan Macaulay, Clan Ferguson and Breconshire were also at Alexandria, ready to be convoyed to Malta. The escorts would meet the merchant ship Cornwall which had been repaired and the four unloaded ships of Convoy MW 3 and escort them back to Alexandria. Part of MB 9 was for aircraft carriers of the Mediterranean Fleet to attack airfields in the Dodecanese Islands and Tripoli in Italian Libya. The Mediterranean Fleet was busy protecting convoys from Port Said and Haifa to Cyprus and Piraeus in Greece; the cruisers were transporting troops to the Aegean and under frequent attack by the Regia Aeronautica.

== Voyage ==
=== Convoy MW 4, 23 November ===
On 23 November, the Malta-bound Convoy MW 4, Breconshire, Clan Ferguson, Clan Macaulay and Memnon sailed with a close escort of the destroyers Hasty, Havock, Hero, Hyperion, Ilex, Vampire, Vendetta and Voyager. The distant escort consisted of the 3rd Cruiser Squadron, Glasgow, Gloucester and York. The convoy reached Malta unhindered at 8:00 a.m. on 26 November.

=== 24−25 November ===
During the night of 24/25 November the three merchant ships passed through the Strait of Gibraltar as Duncan led Hotspur and the corvettes Gloxinia, Hyacinth, Peony and Salvia out of Gibraltar at midnight on 24 November to rendezvous with the freighters. Velox and Wrestler were detached from the escort and put into Gibraltar. Around 4:00 a.m. Army and RAF passengers began to embark on Manchester and Southampton from the liner RMS Franconia completing the move shortly before dawn. At 7:00 a.m. the cruisers sailed with the rest of the Force F destroyers and Force B. The convoy was met off Gibraltar by Force B, the battlecruiser Renown, the aircraft carrier Ark Royal, the cruisers Despatch and Sheffield and the destroyers Faulknor, Firedrake, Forester, Fury, Encounter, Duncan, Wishart, Kelvin and Jaguar.

=== 26 November ===
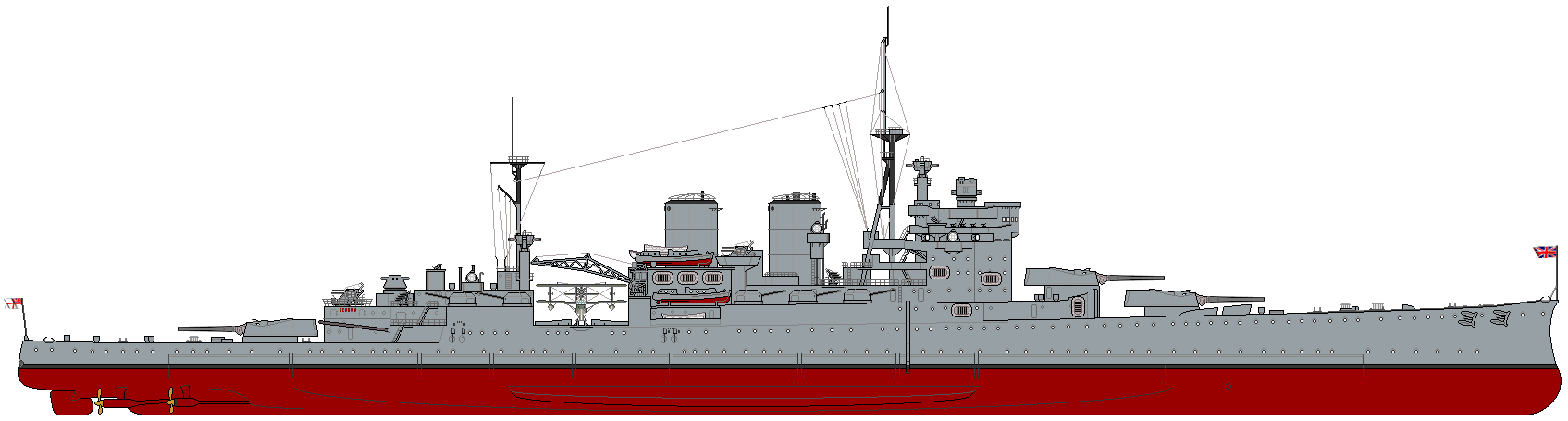
HMS Renown (1939)

Force F and Force B sailed eastwards in clear but gusty weather and at daybreak on 26 November, aircraft took off from Ark Royal for the usual anti-submarines and reconnaissance flights that soon found the convoy. Despatch was sent to join the convoy escorts as the ships came closer to Vichy North Africa. During the afternoon, the fleet turned southwards to steam closer to the merchant ships and two hours later Manchester, Wishart, Encounter and Fury joined the convoy. The speed of the corvettes caused concern and rather than try to alter the plan, during the evening of 26 November, the corvettes were detached from Force F to make their way independently, even though this meant Force F losing their anti-submarine and anti-minesweeping capacity. By dark on 26 November the merchant ships were sailing east at 37°37′N, 06°54′E north of Cap de Fer with the cruisers Dispatch, Manchester and Southampton as close cover and with Force B at 37°48′N, 07°24′E making 15.5 kn (28.7 km/h; 17.8 mph), 10 nmi (19 km; 12 mi) to the north-east of the convoy, the corvettes having fallen back 10 nmi (19 km; 12 mi). Force D from the Mediterranean Fleet was on schedule, north-east of La Galite (Galita) steaming west but wireless contact had not been gained with the eastbound ships and Ark Royal sent an aircraft to look at 8:00 a.m.

==== Convoy ME 4 ====
The merchant ships Cornwall, Devis, Plumleaf, Rodi, Volo and Waiwera assembled in Grand Harbour and Marsaxlokk and departed Malta along the swept channel at 5:45 p.m. with its escorts, the cruiser Calcutta and the Australian destroyers Vampire, Vendetta and Voyager. At 4:00 p.m. on 29 November, Vampire and Vendetta covered Devis and Waiwera into harbour at Alexandria, Calcutta and Voyager sailed on with Volo and Rodi to Port Said on 30 November.

=== Regia Marina ===
The departure of the ships from Gibraltar had been notified to Supermarina and Force D, on its way from Alexandria, had been seen by the occupants of an Italian Ala Littoria airliner on 26 November. The submarines Alagi, Aradam, Axum and Diaspro were sent to the south of Sardinia, Dessiè and Tembien to stations off Malta. Admiral Inigo Campioni sailed from Naples with the battleships Giulio Cesare and Vittorio Veneto, the 13th Destroyer Flotilla with Granatiere, Fuciliere, Bersagliere and Alpino, the 7th Destroyer Flotilla with Freccia, Saetta and Dardo, the 1st Cruiser Division (Admiral Angelo Iachino) with Pola, Fiume, Gorizia and the 9th Destroyer Flotilla of Vittorio Alfieri, Giosuè Carducci, Vincenzo Gioberti and Alfredo Oriani sailed from Naples, the 3rd Cruiser Division (Admiral Luigi Sansonetti) sailed from Messina with Trieste, Trento and Bolzano and the 12th Destroyer Flotilla with Lanciere, Ascari and Carabiniere departed Messina. After dark, the 10th Torpedo Boat Flotilla sailed from Trapani in western Sicily for the Sicilian Narrows with Alcione, Vega, Sagittario and Sirio to attack Force D. The British ships were seen and Sirio fired torpedoes that had no effect and Force D sailed on.

==== Convoy ME 4 ====
The merchant ships Cornwall, Devis, Plumleaf, Rodi, Volo and Waiwera assembled in Grand Harbour and Marsaxlokk, departing from Malta on 26 November along the swept channel at 5:45 p.m. with its escorts, the cruiser Calcutta, Vampire, Vendetta and Voyager. At 4:00 p.m. on 29 November, Vampire and Vendetta covered Devis and Waiwera into harbour at Alexandria, Calcutta and Voyager sailed on with Volo and Rodi to Port Said on 30 November.

=== 27 November ===
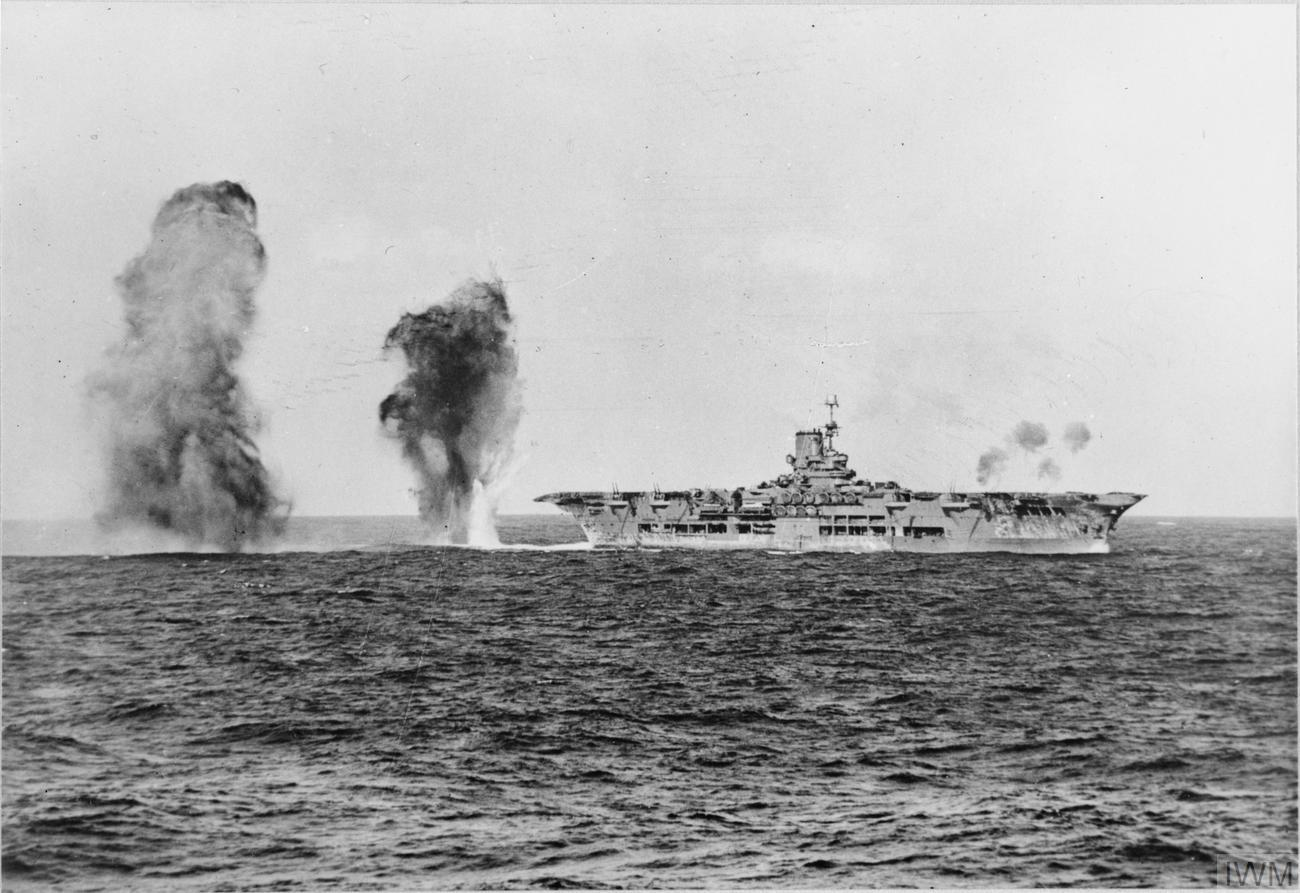
HMS Ark Royal under attack

During the morning of 27 November, when Force B was about 135 nmi (250 km; 155 mi) to the south-west of Cape Spartivento and Ark Royal sent up its ASW and reconnaissance aircraft. Force B tuned about to close with the convoy. A decision had to be made to organise the convoy escorts for air attack by keeping them around the merchant ships or to stay north of the convoy to face a surface attack. At 9:00 a.m. Somerville decided to take up anti-aircraft positions around the convoy. Force B came up to the convoy at 9:20 a.m. and took post to the south to protect the convoy from a possible air attack out of the sun.

A Swordfish crew spotted Italian ships off Cape Spartivento at the south end of Sardinia at 9.06 a.m. The report was not received in Ark Royal, neither British Intelligence, nor air reconnaissance from Malta, had discovered the Italian sailing. Reports from the Swordfish described the Italian force as two battleships with destroyers and two groups of cruisers to the westwards of them. Renown missed the first eleven reports because of a faulty W/T receiver. After a visual signal from Ark Royal, Somerville decided to unite with Ramillies and attack. The details of five cruisers and five destroyers 45 nmi (83 km; 52 mi) to the north-east, caused doubt in case it was Force D but Somerville ordered his ships to prepare for full speed.

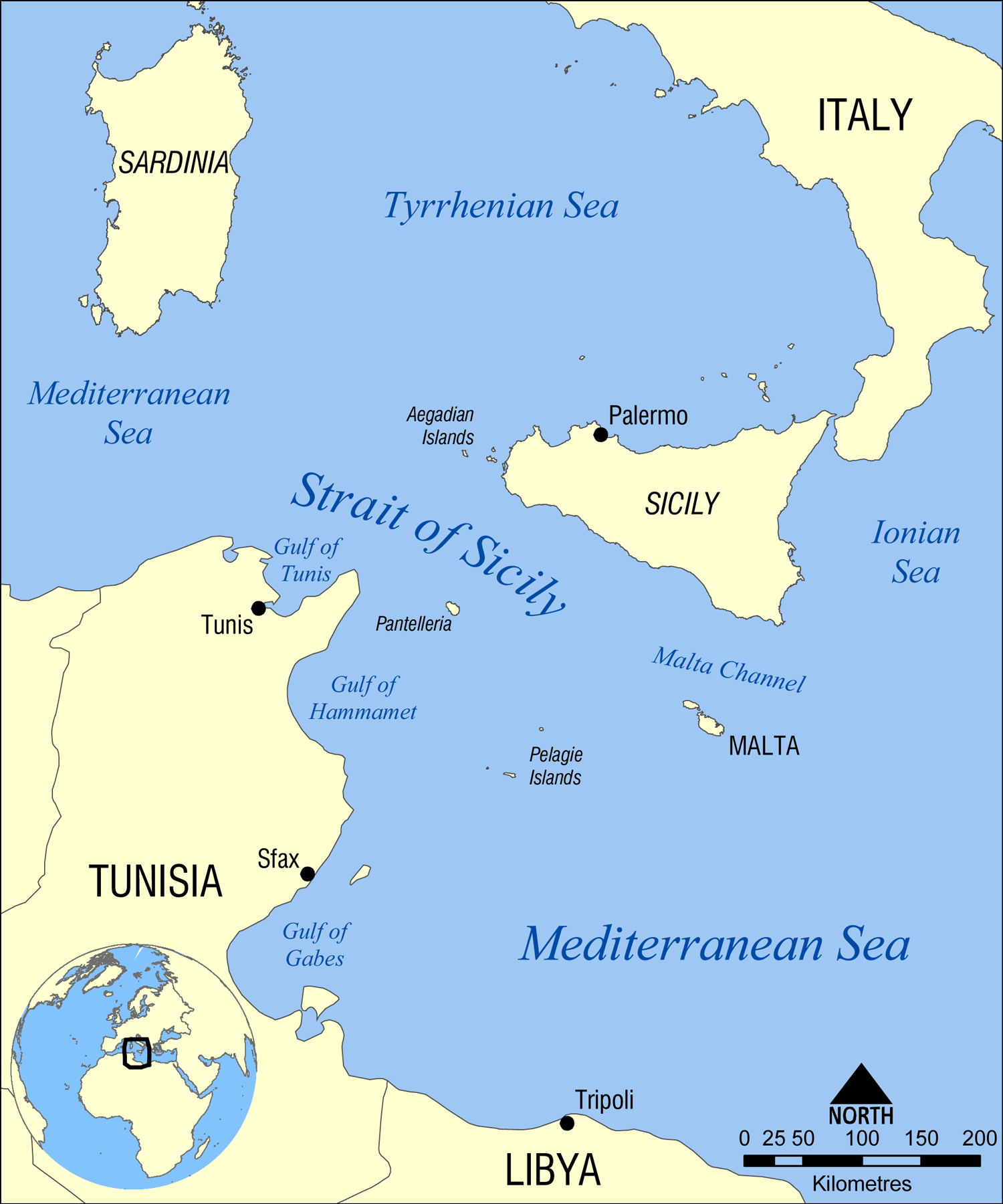
Strait of Sicily

The destroyers Duncan and Wishart were ordered to remain with the convoy; soon afterwards, a report arrived of two battleships and seven destroyers sailing south-west. Once Dispatch, Duncan and Hotspur were on their way back to the convoy, Manchester, Southampton and the Force F destroyers were detached from the convoy to Force B. After more confusing reports a Sunderland appeared and reported Force D to be east-north-east, 34 nmi (63 km; 39 mi) from Force B. Ark Royal had sent its torpedo bombers to the ships to the north-east and the Sunderland was sent to shadow the ships. The convoy, at its best speed, followed a course of 120° to get out of the way. The anti-aircraft cruiser Coventry, with Force D, was ordered to detach and join Force F as quickly as possible.

At 11:55 a.m. a bomber of the Regia Aeronautica reported a convoy of three ships with escorts, the first time that the Italians realised that a convoy operation was taking place. Somerville gave his intention that Force B was to keep the Italian fleet away from the convoy unless there was a prospect of sinking an Italian battleship, then some risk to the convoy was acceptable. Somerville heard that Duncan had suffered an engine breakdown, leaving Force F and the convoy without anti-submarine defence, since it was the only ship with Asdic. Duncan was later taken in tow.

Wishart had Asdic and was struggling to keep up with Force B; it was transferred back to the convoy. At 1:45 p.m., after the engagement at Cape Spartivento, Somerville ordered Manchester, Southampton and the Force F destroyers to return to the convoy. By 4:40 p.m. Force B was also sailing towards the convoy as it neared Sicily. The ships of Force H continued towards the Sicilian Narrows until late afternoon on 27 November, as the Italian battlefleet sailed northwards off the east coast of Sardinia. Just short of Cap Bon, Force B turned for Gibraltar and the convoy sailed through the Strait of Sicily. Ineffective attacks on Force E (the 3rd Cruiser Squadron) that was returning to the Mediterranean Fleet were made by the submarines Dessiè and Tembien during the night.

=== 28/29 November ===
The Italian 10th Torpedo Boat Squadron had sailed from Trapani at 5:05 p.m. and about twelve MAS boats put to sea from several bases. The torpedo boats at about 5 nmi (9.3 km; 5.8 mi) intervals, Sagittario, Sirio, Vega and Calliope from north-east to south-west, sailing west to the area of Cap Bon and turned about at 10:50 p.m. At 11:34 p.m., lookouts on Sagittario spotted eleven ships behind them at 18 kn (33 km/h; 21 mph). At midnight on 28 November, the cruisers of Force E and Force F, the three merchant ships, the 13th Destroyer Flotilla with the four corvettes following on, passed Cape Bon and set course to rendezvous with the Mediterranean Fleet (Admiral Andrew Cunningham) from Alexandria. Sagittario accelerated to attack a cruiser but three destroyers turned towards it, shepherding it to the north-east until out of touch. A few minutes later, Sirio saw an outline 3,000 yd (1.5 nmi) distant and turned again but destroyers headed it off, apparently firing torpedoes. At 00:28 a.m. Vega spotted the convoy but the destroyers appeared again. At 00:55 a.m. Calliope tried to edge closer to the convoy and at 1.27 a.m. fired two torpedoes at 2,200 yd (1.1 nmi) to no effect. Clan Fraser and Clan Forbes arrived at Malta on 29 November and New Zealand Star, escorted by the cruisers Manchester and Southampton, with the destroyers Defender and Hereward, continued to Alexandria.

== Aftermath ==
=== Analysis ===
The oficial British naval historian, Stephen Roskill, wrote that the Italians had failed to intercept the convoy and the merchant ships of Operation Collar reached Malta and Alexandria unharmed. The Battle of Spartivento was indecisive and the failure of the torpedo bombers on Ark Royal to slow the Italian battle fleet as it withdrew confirmed the concerns Somerville had over their lack of training and inexperience. The cessation of the British pursuit led to Somerville being criticised at the Admiralty, the Prime Minister and the dispatch of a senior officer to chair a court of inquiry into Somerville's leadership, an underhand manoeuvre that was resented in the Mediterranean Fleet and Force H. Cunningham commanded another supply convoy to Malta during December and signalled that "the base was as effective as when war broke out and far better defended against air attack or invasion.

On the Italian side, the aftermath of Cape Spartivento pleased no-one, opinion in the Italian fleet was that it had fled before an inferior opponent, even if they had to face an aircraft carrier and that they had failed to pursue the fleeing opponent. Iachino described the battle as "a minor military episode with no decisive results". "Indeed, the action at Cape Teulada, if it was not a success on the strategic level, as the enemy achieved their objective, was truly a tactical success for us and left everyone with the impression that we could confidently measure ourselves against the enemy in a prolonged gun battle". Giorgerini wrote that while it is correct to acknowledge the British had a strategic success in the passage of the convoy and other ships through the Strait of Sicily, "I find that it takes a certain sense of humour to call that action 'a tactical success for us".

The directives issued by Supermarina to the senior commander at sea, requiring the navy to engage "if the situation was favourable" was too vague, contrary to the principle that a clear intent and the goal to be achieved should be communicated. Vagueness served only to paralyse Campioni's initiative. Giorgerini wrote that after the failure of the British torpedo attacks, it would have been possible to use the large ships to stop the convoy. Even though the political–strategic circumstances of Italy required that the opportunity to achieve a success at sea be taken; 27 November 1940 was a bad day for the Regia Marina. After the operation, Campioni was sacked for timidity and replaced by Iachino and sent to the Dodecanese. Admiral Arturo Riccardi took over from Domenico Cavagnari at Supermarina as Chief of Staff of the Regia Marina. Henceforth, the Italian fleet was to operate with air cover, Aquila to be converted as a fighter aircraft carrier and other ships were to be mounted with catapult-launchers for fighters.

=== Casualties ===
The convoy element of Operation Collar suffered no casualties and inflicted none.

=== Subsequent events ===
The Italian battle fleet was reorganised as a battle squadron with Vittorio Veneto, Andrea Doria and Giulio Cesare commanded by Iachino, with the 13th destroyer flotilla commanded by Bruno Brivonesi, the three heavy cruisers and a destroyer flotilla commanded by Admiral Sansonetti, three light cruisers and two destroyer flotillas commanded by Admiral Antonio Legnani, three light cruisers and a destroyer flotilla commanded by Admiral Alberto Marenco di Moriondo and three more light cruisers and two destroyer flotillas commanded directly by Supermarina.

== Orders of battle ==
=== Merchant ships ===
Freighters (Operation Collar)
Ship	Year	Flag	GRT	Notes
Clan Forbes	1938	Merchant Navy	7,529	Scotland–Gibraltar–Malta
Clan Fraser	1939	Merchant Navy	7,529	Scotland–Gibraltar–Malta
New Zealand Star	1935	Merchant Navy	10,941	Scotland–Gibraltar–Malta

=== Escorts ===
Escort forces
Ship	Flag	Type	Notes
Escorts from the Clyde to Gibraltar
HMS Vidette	Royal Navy	V-class destroyer	
HMS Velox	Royal Navy	V-class destroyer	
HMS Wrestler	Royal Navy	W-class destroyer	
From Force H
Force B, Admiral James Somerville
HMS Renown	Royal Navy	Renown-class battlecruiser	
HMS Ark Royal	Royal Navy	Aircraft carrier	
HMS Sheffield	Royal Navy	Town-class cruiser	
HMS Despatch	Royal Navy	Danae-class cruiser	
HMS Encounter	Royal Navy	F-class destroyer	
HMS Faulknor	Royal Navy	F-class destroyer	
HMS Firedrake	Royal Navy	F-class destroyer	
HMS Forester	Royal Navy	F-class destroyer	
HMS Fury	Royal Navy	F-class destroyer	
HMS Jaguar	Royal Navy	J-class destroyer	
HMS Kelvin	Royal Navy	K-class destroyer	
HMS Wishart	Royal Navy	W-class destroyer	
Force F, Vice-Admiral Lancelot Holland
HMS Despatch	Royal Navy	Danae-class cruiser	
HMS Manchester	Royal Navy	Town-class cruiser	Flag
HMS Southampton	Royal Navy	Town-class cruiser	
HMS Duncan	Royal Navy	D-class destroyer	Flag 13th Destroyer Flotilla, Captain George Stevens-Guille
HMS Hotspur	Royal Navy	H-class destroyer	Damaged 20 October, ramming submarine Lafolè; to Malta for repairs
HMS Vidette	Royal Navy	V-class destroyer	
HMS Gloxinia	Royal Navy	Flower-class corvette	
HMS Hyacinth	Royal Navy	Flower-class corvette	
HMS Peony	Royal Navy	Flower-class corvette	
HMS Salvia	Royal Navy	Flower-class corvette	
From Mediterranean Fleet
Force D
HMS Ramillies	Royal Navy	Revenge-class battleship	
HMS Berwick	Royal Navy	County-class cruiser	Turbine faults
HMS Newcastle	Royal Navy	Town-class cruiser	Boiler trouble
HMS Coventry	Royal Navy	C-class cruiser	AA cruiser
HMS Defender	Royal Navy	D-class destroyer	
HMS Greyhound	Royal Navy	G-class destroyer	
HMS Griffin	Royal Navy	G-class destroyer	
HMS Hereward	Royal Navy	H-class destroyer	
Force E
HMS Glasgow	Royal Navy	Town-class cruiser	Distant escort for Convoy MW 4
HMS Gloucester	Royal Navy	Town-class cruiser	Distant escort for Convoy MW 4
HMS York	Royal Navy	York-class cruiser	Distant escort for Convoy MW 4

=== ME 4 escorts ===
Escorts for ME 4
Ship	Flag	Type	Notes
From the Mediterranean Fleet
HMS Calcutta	Royal Navy	C-class cruiser	
HMAS Vampire	Royal Navy	V-class destroyer	
HMAS Vendetta	Royal Navy	V-class destroyer	
HMAS Voyager	Royal Navy	W-class destroyer	

=== Convoy MW 4 ===
Alexandria to Malta
Ship	Year	Flag	GRT	Notes
HMS Breconshire	1939	Merchant Navy	9,776	Alexandria to Malta 23−26 November
SS Clan Ferguson	1938	Merchant Navy	7,347	Alexandria to Malta 23−26 November
SS Clan Macaulay	1936	Merchant Navy	10,492	Alexandria to Malta 23−26 November
MV Memnon	1930	Merchant Navy	7,506	Alexandria to Malta 23−26 November

=== MW 4 escorts ===
Escorts for Convoy MW 4
Ship	Flag	Type	Notes
From the Mediterranean Fleet
HMS Hasty	Royal Navy	H-class destroyer	
HMS Havock	Royal Navy	H-class destroyer	
HMS Hero	Royal Navy	H-class destroyer	
HMS Hyperion	Royal Navy	H-class destroyer	
HMS Ilex	Royal Navy	I-class destroyer	
HMAS Vampire	Royal Navy	V-class destroyer	
HMAS Vendetta	Royal Navy	V-class destroyer	
HMAS Voyager	Royal Navy	W-class destroyer	

== Bibliography ==
- Giorgerini, Giorgio (2001). La guerra italiana sul mare. La Marina tra vittoria e sconfitta 1940–1943 [The Italian War at Sea: The Navy between Victory and Defeat 1940–1943] (in Italian). Milano: Mondadori. ISBN 978-8-80-440581-8.
- Greene, Jack; Massignani, Alessandro (2002) [1998]. The Naval War in the Mediterranean, 1940–1943. Rochester: Chatham. ISBN 978-1-86176-057-9.
- Hague, Arnold (2000). The Allied Convoy System 1939–1945: It's Organization, Defence and Operation (hbk. repr. Chatham, London ed.). St. Catherine's, ONT: Vanwell Publishing. ISBN 978-1-55125-033-5.
- Hobbs, David (2020). Taranto and Naval Air Warfare in the Mediterranean 1940−1945. Barnsley: Seaforth. ISBN 978-1-5267-9385-0.
- Holland, James (2003). Fortress Malta: An Island Under Siege, 1940–1943. New York: Miramax Books. ISBN 978-1-4013-5186-1.
- Jordan, Roger W. (2006) [1999]. The World's Merchant Fleets 1939: The Particulars and Wartime Fates of 6,000 Ships (2nd ed.). London: Chatham/Lionel Leventhal. ISBN 978-1-86176-293-1.
- O'Hara, Vincent (2009). Struggle for the Middle Sea: The Great Navies at War in the Mediterranean Theater, 1940–1945. Annapolis, Maryland: Naval Institute Press. ISBN 978-1-61251-408-6.
- Richards, D.; Saunders, H. St G. (1975) [1954]. Royal Air Force 1939–45: The Fight Avails. Vol. II (repr. ed.). London: HMSO. ISBN 978-0-11-771593-6. Archived from the original on 1 January 2019.
- Rohwer, Jürgen; Hümmelchen, Gerhard (2005) [1972]. Chronology of the War at Sea, 1939–1945: The Naval History of World War Two (3rd rev. ed.). London: Chatham. ISBN 978-1-86176-257-3.
- Roskill, S. W. (1957) [1954]. Butler, J. R. M. (ed.). The Defensive. History of the Second World War United Kingdom Military Series: The War at Sea 1939–1945. Vol. I (4th impr. ed.). London: HMSO. OCLC 881709135.
- Smith, Peter C. (2011). Critical Conflict: The Royal Navy's Mediterranean Campaign in 1940. Barnsley: Pen & Sword Aviation. ISBN 978-1-84884-513-8. First published as Action Imminent: Three Studies of the Naval War in the Mediterranean Theatre during 1940 (1980) William Kimber, London. ISBN 978-0-7183-0277-1
- Woodman, R. (2003). Malta Convoys 1940–1943 (pbk. ed.). London: John Murray. ISBN 978-0-7195-6408-6.

== See also ==
- Battle of the Mediterranean
- Malta Convoys
- Battle of Cape Spartivento
