= SS Clan Forbes (1938) =

British cargo steamship

- Clan Forbes

History

United Kingdom
- Name: Clan Forbes
- Namesake: Clan Forbes
- Owner: Clan Line Steamers Ltd, London
- Operator: Cayzer, Irvine & Co Ltd, London
- Port of registry: Glasgow
- Builder: Greenock Dockyard Co, Scotland
- Yard number: 434
- Launched: 8 September 1938
- Completed: December 1938
- Identification: UK official number 165951; Call sign GPGB
- Fate: Scrapped 1959

General characteristics
- Class & type: Cameron-class steamship
- Tonnage: 7,529 GRT, 3,524 NRT
- Length: 463.7 feet (141.3 m) p/p
- Beam: 63.0 feet (19.2 m)
- Draught: 29 feet 1 1/4 inches (8.87 m)
- Depth: 29.9 feet (9.1 m)
- Installed power: 1,370 NHP
- Propulsion: two 3-cylinder triple-expansion engines; two low-pressure exhaust steam turbines; twin screw
- Speed: 17.5 knots (32.4 km/h)
- Sensors & processing systems: direction finding equipment; echo sounding device; gyrocompass
- Armament: DEMS
- Notes: sister ships: Clan Buchanan, Clan Cameron, Clan Campbell, Clan Chattan, Clan Cumming, Clan Ferguson, Clan Fraser, Clan Lamont, Clan Menzies, HMS Engadine

The SS Clan Forbes was a British cargo steamship. She was built for Clan Line Steamers Ltd as one of its Cameron-class steamships. She was launched at Greenock in 1938, served in the Second World War and was scrapped in Hong Kong 1959.

This was the third of four Clan Line ships called Clan Forbes. The first was a steamship built in 1882 and sold to Furness, Withy & Co in 1903. The second was a steamship built in 1903 and sunk by a u-boat in 1918. The fourth was a motor ship built in 1961, sold in 1968 and scrapped in 1985.

== Building ==
Clan Forbes was launched on 8 September 1938 and completed that December. She was one of a sub-class of 11 Cameron-class ships of identical dimensions, built in 1937–41 by the Greenock Dockyard Company on the River Clyde at Greenock in Renfrewshire: Clan Buchanan, Clan Cameron, Clan Campbell, Clan Chattan, Clan Cumming, Clan Ferguson, Clan Fraser, Clan Forbes, Clan Lamont, Clan Menzies and HMS Engadine.

Clan Forbes had 20 corrugated furnaces with a combined grate area of 402 square feet (37 m^{2}) heating five single-ended forced draught boilers with a combined heating surface of 17,780 square feet (1,652 m^{2}) that supplied superheated steam at 220 lb_{f}/in^{2} to a pair of three-cylinder triple-expansion steam engines. Each reciprocating engine had a 48 inches (1.2 m) stroke; the cylinder bores were 26 inches (0.66 m) high pressure, 42 inches (1.1 m) intermediate pressure and 68 inches (1.7 m) low pressure. Steam exhausted from the low-pressure cylinders then drove a pair of Bauer-Wach low-pressure steam turbines with double reduction gearing and Föttinger hydraulic couplings to twin propeller shafts. J G Kincaid and Company of Greenock built the four engines, whose combined power was rated at 1,370 NHP.

== War service ==
On 16 August 1940 Clan Forbes was damaged by bombs in a Luftwaffe air raid whilst berthed at Port of Tilbury. In November 1940 she was one of the three merchant ships that took part in Operation Collar, a convoy to supply Malta and Alexandria. An attempt by Italian forces to intercept the ships resulted in the Battle of Cape Spartivento, after which Clan Forbes and her sister Clan Fraser continued to Malta. She spent some of her time disguised as the submarine depot ship HMS Maidstone, having been fitted with a dummy funnel.

== Post-war ==
Surviving the war, she continued in Clan Line service until 1959. She was then sold for scrap, and arrived at Hong Kong on 6 August 1959 to be broken up.
