= SS Clan Fraser =

SS Clan Fraser is the name of the following ships of the Clan Line:

- SS Clan Fraser (1878), sold in 1899 and wrecked in 1902.
- SS Clan Fraser (1900), sold in 1919 and lost in 1920.
- SS Clan Fraser (1938), bombed and sunk in 1941.
- MV Clan Fraser, built in 1961, sold in 1965, burnt out in 1979 and scrapped in 1980.

== See also ==
- Clan Fraser
