= SS Clan Campbell =

SS Clan Campbell is the name of the following ships of the Clan Line, named for Clan Campbell:

- SS Clan Campbell (1882), ran aground 21 September 1882
- SS Clan Campbell (1894), sold in 1914 and renamed Camira
- SS Clan Campbell (1914), sunk 3 April 1916 by SM U-39
- SS Clan Campbell (1937), sunk 23 March 1942
- SS Clan Campbell (1943), scrapped 1962
