= Italian submarine F12 =

Italian Navy submarine of 1917–1929

- F12's launch at Muggiano, La Spezia, Italy, on 30 November 1916.

History

Italy
- Name: F12
- Builder: FIAT-San Giorgio, La Spezia, Italy
- Laid down: 29 July 1915
- Launched: 30 November 1916
- Commissioned: 26 February 1917
- Decommissioned: 20 July 1929
- Identification: Pennant number F12
- Motto: Ardisci e Spera ("Daring and Hope")
- Fate: Scrapped

General characteristics
- Class & type: F-class submarine
- Displacement: 262 long tons (266 t) (surfaced); 319 long tons (324 t) (submerged)
- Length: 45.6 m (149 ft 7 in) (overall); 45.1 m (148 ft 0 in) (between perpendiculars)
- Beam: 4.2 m (13 ft 9 in)
- Draught: 3.1 m (10 ft 2 in)
- Propulsion: 2 × 670 bhp (500 kW) Fiat diesel engines; 2 × 500 hp (373 kW) Savigliano electric motors; 2 x shafts; 15 tons diesel fuel
- Speed: 12.5 knots (23.2 km/h; 14.4 mph) (surfaced); 8.2 knots (15.2 km/h; 9.4 mph) (submerged)
- Range: 1,600 nmi (3,000 km; 1,800 mi) at 8.5 knots (15.7 km/h; 9.8 mph) (surfaced); 80 nmi (150 km; 92 mi) at 4 knots (7.4 km/h; 4.6 mph) (submerged)
- Test depth: 45 metres (148 feet)
- Complement: 26 (2 officers, 24 men)
- Armament: 2 × 450 mm (17.7 in) torpedo tubes (2 bow); 4 x torpedoes; 1 × 76 mm (3 in) deck gun
- Notes: SOURCE:

F12 was an F-class submarine in commission in the Italian Regia Marina (Royal Navy) from 1917 to 1929. She took part in World War I, conducting antisubmarine patrols in the Mediterranean Sea during the Mediterranean U-boat campaign and seeing service in the Adriatic Campaign. She sank the Austro-Hungarian submarine U-20 in 1918.

== Construction and commissioning ==
F12 was laid down by FIAT-San Giorgio at Muggiano, La Spezia, Italy, on 29 July 1915. She was launched on 30 November 1916 and commissioned on 26 February 1917.

== Service history ==
Upon F12′s commissioning in February 1917, the Italian Regia Marina (Royal Navy) assigned her to the La Spezia Maritime Command. Under its direction, she conducted two antisubmarine patrols in the Mediterranean Sea south of Cape Carbonara, Sardinia, during the Mediterranean U-boat campaign of World War I. In March 1917, she operated off La Maddalena, Sardinia.

F12 departed Sardinia on 25 March 1917 and deployed to the northern Adriatic Sea where, based at Venice, she took part in the Adriatic Campaign, conducting 53 war patrols. During a patrol from 13 to 15 June 1918 under the command of Tenente di vascello (Ship-of-the-Line Lieutenant) Alberto Marenco di Moriondo — a future ammiraglio di squadra (squadron admiral) — she came under fire from an Austro-Hungarian Navy torpedo boat south of Cape Promontore on the southern coast of Istria about 2 nautical miles (3.7 km; 2.3 mi) from the Porer Rock at 09:15 on 13 June 1918. After she escaped from the torpedo boat, she sighted an Austro-Hungarian minesweeper, at which she fired a torpedo at a range of about 600 metres (660 yards). The torpedo missed, and F12 quickly submerged and withdrew after the minesweeper opened fire on her.

In July 1918, F12 torpedoed the Austro-Hungarian submarine U-20 near the mouth of the Tagliamento at position 45°29′N 13°05′E. U-20 sank with the loss of all hands, leaving an oil slick, but no wreckage, on the surface. Sources disagree on the date of the sinking, placing it on 4 July at 10:43, on 6 July, and on 9 July.

During a patrol that lasted from 16 to 18 July 1918, F12 sighted an Austro-Hungarian Huszár-class destroyer near the islet of Sveti Ivan na Pučini (known to the Italians as San Giovanni in Pelago) in the Brijuni archipelago off Rovinj (known to the Italians as Rovigno). She fired a torpedo which missed the destroyer.

On 24 August 1918, Austro-Hungarian aircraft attacked F12 south of Cape Promontore. Although they dropped 15 bombs, she suffered no damage.

After World War I ended in November 1918, F12 continued to operate in the northern Adriatic Sea, based at Venice and Pola. She took part in annual attack exercises and torpedo-firing drills. On 1 October 1925 she became part of the Submarine Division.

F12 was decommissioned on 20 July 1929. She subsequently was scrapped.
