= Alberto Marenco di Moriondo =

Italian admiral

- Born: 15 December 1889; Novara, Kingdom of Italy
- Died: 27 May 1958 (aged 68); Turin, Italy
- Military career
- Allegiance: Kingdom of Italy
- Branch: Regia Marina
- Service years: 1911-1946
- Rank: Squadron Admiral
- Commands: F 12 (submarine); Gorizia (heavy cruiser); 1st Naval Division; Pola Naval Command; 4th Naval Division; Western Greece Naval Command
- Conflicts: Italo-Turkish War; World War I; Adriatic Campaign of World War I; Spanish Civil War; World War II; Battle of Calabria
- Awards: Silver Medal of Military Valor (twice); Bronze Medal of Military Valor; War Merit Cross (four times); Military Order of Savoy; Order of the Crown of Italy; Order of Saints Maurice and Lazarus; Colonial Order of the Star of Italy

Alberto Marenco di Moriondo (Novara, 15 December 1889 – Turin, 27 May 1958) was an Italian admiral during World War II.

== Biography ==
=== Early life and career ===
He was born in Novara on 15 December 1889, the son of Cesare Marenco di Moriondo and Lydia Arborio di Gattinara. In 1907 he entered the Royal Naval Academy of Livorno, graduating with the rank of ensign in 1911, participating in the Italo-Turkish War aboard the battleship Benedetto Brin. During the course of the First World War he mainly served on submarines; he was awarded a Bronze Medal of Military Valor while serving as executive officer of Zoea, and later assumed command of F12, earning a Silver Medal of Military Valor for the sinking of the Austro-Hungarian submarine U-20. In 1918 he was promoted to lieutenant commander for war merit and from 1919 to 1923 he served as aide-de-camp to King Victor Emmanuel III.

He then resumed service at sea aboard torpedo boats; in 1924 he was promoted to commander, and between 1927 and 1929 he was deputy commander of the submarine flotilla. On July 16, 1930, he was promoted to captain, then assuming the position of Chief of Staff of the Northern Tyrrhenian Naval Department. Between 10 October 1933 and 5 April 1935 he was commanding officer of the heavy cruiser Gorizia, and on 25 September 1935 he was promoted to rear admiral; during the Spanish Civil War he was in command of the Italian naval group supporting the Francoists, with the scout cruiser Quarto as flagship. On January 1, 1938, he was promoted to vice admiral and assumed command of the 1st Naval Division, raising his flag on the heavy cruiser Zara.

=== World War II and later years ===
Having become Naval Commander of Pola in 1939, from 24 May 1940 he was appointed commander of the 4th Naval Division, a position he held from the entry of the Kingdom of Italy in World War II, which took place on 10 June 1940, until May 1941, participating in the battle of Calabria and distinguishing himself in several minelaying and convoy escort missions, for which he was awarded the Knight's Cross of the Military Order of Savoy. He was then appointed Naval Commander of the Western Greece sector (Marimorea) with headquarters in Patras, a post he held until August 1943. On 9 January 1941 he lost his son Carlo, killed in action aboard a submarine in the battle of the Atlantic, who was posthumously awarded the Gold Medal of Military Valor.

Having returned to Italy to take up the post of president of the Superior Council of the Navy in Rome, he was surprised in the capital by the proclamation of the Armistice of Cassibile on 8 September 1943. He refused any collaboration with the authorities of the newly established Italian Social Republic and reached his native Piedmont, where he joined the ranks of the Resistance. He fought as a partisan in the Langhe, taking part in numerous war actions with Enrico Martini's 1° Gruppo Divisioni Alpine, for which after the end of the war he would be awarded a second silver medal for military valor. In April 1945 he resumed active service in the Navy, assigned to the Ministry as a member of the Special Commission of Inquiry, where he served until March 4, 1946, when he retired from active service. He died in Turin on March 27, 1958.
