= HMS Hyacinth (K84) =

Flower-class corvette of the Royal Navy

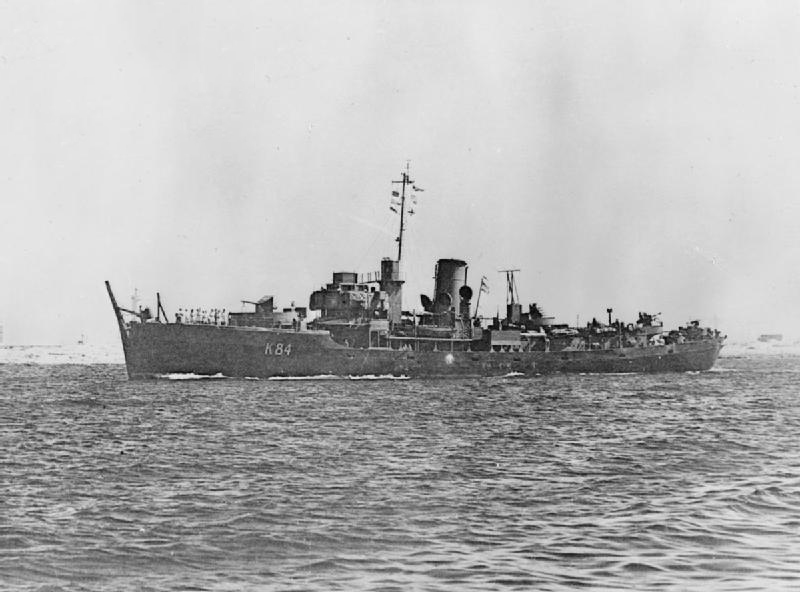
- Apostolis in 1943, just after transfer to the Greek navy

History

United Kingdom
- Name: HMS Hyacinth
- Builder: Harland & Wolff, Belfast, Northern Ireland
- Yard number: 1071
- Laid down: 20 April 1940
- Launched: 19 August 1940
- Completed: 3 October 1940
- Commissioned: 2 October 1940
- Out of service: Transferred to the Royal Hellenic Navy on 24 October 1943
- Renamed: Apostolis on transfer
- Fate: Scrapped in 1952

Kingdom of Greece
- Name: Apostolis
- Acquired: 1943
- Out of service: 1952
- Fate: Returned to the Royal Navy in 1952

General characteristics
- Class & type: Flower-class corvette
- Displacement: 925 long tons (940 t)
- Length: 205 ft (62 m)
- Beam: 33 ft (10 m)
- Draught: 11 ft 6 in (3.51 m)
- Propulsion: Two fire tube boilers; One 4-cycle triple expansion steam engine; Single shaft
- Speed: 16 knots (30 km/h) at 2,750 hp (2,050 kW)
- Range: 3,500 nautical miles (6,500 km; 4,000 mi) at 12 knots (22 km/h; 14 mph)
- Complement: 85
- Armament: 1 × QF 12-pounder 12 cwt naval gun (3-inch/40); 2 × .50 cal machine gun twin machine guns; 2 × 0.303-inch Lewis machine guns; 2 × stern depth charge racks with 40 depth charges

HMS Hyacinth was a Flower-class corvette of the Royal Navy. She served during the Second World War and achieved three victories over enemy submarines in a highly successful career. Only Sunflower managed to repeat such success among her sister ships. She went on to serve in the Royal Hellenic Navy as RHNS Apostolis (Greek: ΒΠ Αποστόλης), was returned to the Royal Navy in 1952 and scrapped in the same year.

== Royal Navy ==
During the Second World War Hyacinth served in the Eastern Mediterranean where she protected the Palestine coastline and escorted numerous convoys along it. She also took part in the Malta convoys. She was a part of the 10th Corvette Group of the Mediterranean Fleet based in Alexandria together with her sister ships Peony and Salvia.

Since Hyacinth spent most of her time in the Mediterranean, without access to British shipyards, she was not retrofitted as many of her class were, and so retained her short forecastle. Another of her distinctive features was a 3-inch gun instead of the usual 4-inch.

=== Anti-submarine successes ===
On 28 September 1941, Hyacinth attacked and sank the Italian submarine Fisalia north-west of the port of Jaffa, at 32º19'N, 34º17'E, just off the beach at Tel Aviv.

On 9 July 1942, while escorting a convoy from Jaffa to Beirut Hyacinth attacked, damaged and captured the Italian submarine Perla. The submarine was towed into port, repaired and put into operation with the Hellenic Navy under the name Matrosos (Greek: Ματρώζος) in 1943.

On 12 September 1943, after Italy had capitulated, Hyacinth and the Australian minesweeper Wollongong sank the German submarine U-617, after the submarine had been damaged in an attack by Wellington and Swordfish aircraft.

== Royal Hellenic Navy ==
In 1943, Hyacinth was transferred to the Royal Hellenic Navy, and was renamed Apostolis (Αποστόλης), from Nikolis Apostolis, an admiral of the Greek War of Independence, and served the remainder of the Second World War under the Greek flag.

== Sources ==
- Helgason, Guðmundur. "HMS Hyacinth ". German U-boats of WWII – uboat.net.
- "Escort ships and minsweepers. (Эскортные корабли и тральщики)". A.V.Dashyan, «WWII ships. British fleet». part 2. (А.В. Дашьян, «Корабли Второй мировой войны. ВМС Великобритании». Часть 2) (in Russian). Navy Collection. (Морская Коллекция).
- "Italian Submarines in World War II". Regia Marina Italiana. Archived from the original on 8 February 2009.
