= HMS Peony (K40) =

Flower-class corvette

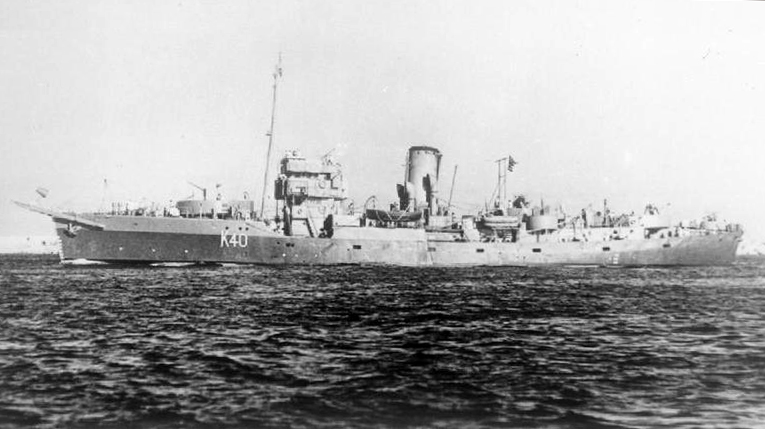
- Sachtouris underway in September 1943, shortly after her transfer to the Royal Hellenic Navy.

History

United Kingdom
- Name: HMS Peony
- Builder: Harland & Wolff, Belfast, Northern Ireland
- Yard number: 1066
- Laid down: 24 February 1940
- Launched: 4 June 1940
- Completed: 2 August 1940
- Commissioned: 2 August 1940
- Out of service: Transferred to the Royal Hellenic Navy in 1943
- Renamed: Sachtouris on transfer
- Reinstated: Returned to the Royal Navy in September 1951
- Identification: Pennant number: K40
- Fate: Scrapped 21 April 1952

Kingdom of Greece
- Name: Sachtouris
- Namesake: Georgios Sachtouris
- Acquired: 1943
- Out of service: September 1951

General characteristics
- Class & type: Flower-class corvette
- Displacement: 925 long tons (940 t)
- Length: 205 ft (62 m)
- Beam: 33 ft (10 m)
- Draught: 11 ft 6 in (3.51 m)
- Propulsion: Two fire tube boilers; One 4-cycle triple expansion steam engine; Single shaft
- Speed: 16 knots (30 km/h) at 2,750 hp (2,050 kW)
- Range: 3,500 nmi (6,500 km; 4,000 mi) at 12 knots (22 km/h; 14 mph)
- Complement: 85
- Armament: 1 × BL 4 in (102 mm) Mk IX gun; 2 × .50 cal machine gun twin machine guns; 2 × 0.303 in Lewis machine guns; 2 × stern depth charge racks with 40 depth charges

HMS Peony was a Flower-class corvette of the Royal Navy. In 1943 she was transferred to the Royal Hellenic Navy (Greek navy) as RHNS Sachtouris (Greek: ΒΠ Σαχτούρης), serving throughout World War II and the Greek Civil War. She was returned to the Royal Navy in 1951 and scrapped in April 1952.

== Royal Navy ==
Throughout her Royal Navy career Peony escorted convoys: primarily in home waters, but sometimes in the Mediterranean Sea and to Freetown in Sierra Leone.

From late 1940 to early 1941 she was part of the 10th Corvette Group, Mediterranean Fleet based at Alexandria, with which she escorted numerous convoys to Malta. In February 1941 she was equipped for minesweeping as not enough minesweepers were available. In July 1941 she helped to transport troops to Cyprus. She undertook anti-submarine operations off Cyprus in the following months. Along with the Australian destroyer HMAS Vendetta, three corvettes and two anti-submarine aircraft she attacked a U-boat on 8 October 1941, but the U-boat escaped.

In December 1941 while escorting Mediterranean convoy AT-6 from Alexandria to Tobruk, the German submarine U-559 torpedoed the Polish steamer Warszawa and attacked Peony. Peony took Warszawa in tow until another torpedo from the U-boat sank the steamship with the loss of 23 men. Peony and HMS Avon Vale rescued the survivors.

In the small hours of 24 December 1941 U-568 torpedoed and sank a sister ship, HMS Salvia, about 100 nautical miles (190 km) west of Alexandria. Salvia was carrying not only her own complement but also about 100 survivors from SS Shuntien, which U-559 had sunk a few hours earlier. Peony went to Salvia's rescue but found no survivors: only a patch of oil.

== Royal Hellenic Navy ==
In 1943 Peony was transferred to the Royal Hellenic Navy, which renamed her as the "Royal Ship Sachtouris" (ΒΠ Σαχτούρης) after Georgios Sachtouris, an admiral in the Greek War of Independence. She was the second of three ships to bear this name, the first being a gunboat built in 1834 in Greece, and the third being the Gearing-class destroyer USS Arnold J. Isbell. (Note: The corvette was the second HMS Peony to be transferred to the Hellenic Navy. The first was a seaplane tender, which was captured by the Germans in 1941 and was still afloat when this ship was transferred, but sank after hitting a mine in the same year.)

She served the remainder of the Second World War under the Greek flag. She also served in the Greek Civil War that broke out after the end of the Second World War.

In 1947 the United States in what became known as the Truman Doctrine declared its support the Greek government in its war against Communist guerrillas. In the early 1950s the Mutual Defense Assistance Act started the transfer of American ships to Greece. Four Cannon-class destroyer escorts entered Greek service and so the old British Flower-class corvettes were superseded.

== Fate ==
Sachtouris was returned to the Royal Navy in September 1951 and scrapped on 21 April 1952.

== Sources ==
- Helgason, Guðmundur. "Flower-class corvettes". German U-boats of WWII – uboat.net.
- naval-history.net
