= SS Clan Fraser (1938) =

British cargo ship

- Clan Fraser

History

United Kingdom
- Name: Clan Fraser
- Owner: Clan Line Steamers Ltd, London
- Operator: Cayzer, Irvine & Co Ltd, London
- Port of registry: Glasgow
- Builder: Greenock Dockyard Co., Greenock
- Yard number: 435
- Launched: 20 December 1938
- Completed: February 1939
- Identification: Call sign GPPY; UK official number 165960
- Fate: bombed and sunk, 6 April 1941

General characteristics
- Class & type: Cameron-class steamship
- Tonnage: 7,529 GRT, 3,524 NRT
- Length: 463.7 feet (141.3 m) registered length
- Beam: 63.0 feet (19.2 m)
- Draught: 28 feet 4 1/4 inches (8.64 m)
- Depth: 29.9 feet (9.1 m)
- Installed power: 1,370 NHP
- Propulsion: 2 × steam triple expansion engines; 2 × low pressure exhaust turbines; twin screw
- Speed: 17.5 knots (32.4 km/h)

SS Clan Fraser was a British cargo steamship. She served in the Second World War and was bombed and sunk in Greece in 1941.

This was the third of four Clan Line ships called Clan Fraser. The first was a steamship built in 1878, sold in 1899 and wrecked in 1902. The second was a steamship built in 1900, sold in 1919 and lost in 1920. The fourth was a motor ship built in 1961, sold in 1965, burnt out in 1979 and scrapped in 1980.

== Building ==
Clan Fraser was one of the Clan Line's Cameron-class steamships, built by the Greenock & Grangemouth Dockyard Co Ltd, Greenock and launched on 20 December 1938 and completed in February 1939. She was registered in Glasgow.

Fraser had 20 corrugated furnaces with a combined grate area of 402 square feet (37 m^{2}). They heated five single-ended boilers with a combined heating surface of 17,780 square feet (1,652 m^{2}). These supplied steam at 220 lb_{f}/in^{2} to a pair of three-cylinder steam triple expansion engines. Exhaust steam from each engine's low-pressure cylinder fed one of a pair of low pressure steam turbines. All the engines were built by JG Kincaid & Co of Greenock. The combined power output of this plant was rated at 1,043 NHP. She was propelled by twin screws, each driven by one triple-expansion engine and one turbine.

== War service ==
Clan Fraser sailed independently for the first year of the Second World War. She worked between the Indian sub-continent, southern Africa, Australia, Britain and the Mediterranean without being part of a convoy until 5 September 1940, when she sailed carrying general cargo from the Firth of Clyde to Methil with Convoy WN 13. At the end of the month she returned from Methil to the Clyde with Convoy OB 222.

Clan Fraser was one of the three fast merchant ships that took part in Operation Collar, a convoy to supply Malta and Alexandria. An attempt by Italian forces to intercept the ships led to the Battle of Cape Spartivento, after which Clan Fraser and her sister Clan Forbes continued on to Malta.

Clan Fraser and Clan Forbes returned to Gibraltar in Convoy MG 1, and Fraser continued to the Clyde under escort. She then resumed independent sailing, first to South Africa and then via the Indian Ocean to Aden. There she joined Convoy BN 21 to Suez carrying a cargo of stores. She passed through the Suez Canal. At Port Saïd, carrying a cargo of munitions, she joined Convoy ANF 24, with which she reached the Port of Piraeus in Greece on 4 April.

On 6 April 1941 German forces invaded Greece and Luftwaffe Junkers Ju 88 bombers led by Hans-Joachim 'Hajo' Herrmann attacked shipping in Piraeus. Clan Fraser was in port still unloading her arms and 200 tons of TNT. At 0315 hrs she was hit and destroyed when her TNT exploded. She sank in the harbour, with six killed and nine wounded. Her Master, J.H. Giles, was among the survivors. The shock of the blast was felt 15 miles (24 km) away in Athens, where doors were blown in; and in Psihiko, where windows were shattered. White hot débris detonated ΤΝΤ in other nearby ships, setting them and buildings ashore on fire. By morning the port had been severely damaged.
