= List of shipwrecks in September 1882 =

The list of shipwrecks in September 1882 includes ships sunk, foundered, grounded, or otherwise lost during September 1882.

== 1 September ==
List of shipwrecks: 1 September 1882
Ship	State	Description
Jane and Jessie	United Kingdom	The ship was wrecked on the Barber Sand, in the North Sea off the coast of Norfolk. Her crew were rescued. She was on a voyage from Poole, Dorset to Lerwick, Shetland Islands.
Snowdoun	United Kingdom	The steamship collided with the steamship Fingal (United Kingdom) and sank in the Humber at Hull, Yorkshire. All on board were rescued. Snowdoun was on a voyage from Leith, Lothian to Hull.
St. George	United Kingdom	The fishing lugger sank at Argdlass, County Down. Her crew survived.

== 5 September ==
List of shipwrecks: 5 September 1882
Ship	State	Description
Alexandria	Norway	The ship was driven ashore at Dénia, Spain.
Unnamed	Russia	The ship sprang a leak and sank at Kronstadt.

== 7 September ==
List of shipwrecks: 7 September 1882
Ship	State	Description
Catherine	United Kingdom	The brigantine collided with Balkamah (United Kingdom) off Start Point, Devon and was severely damaged. Catherine was on a voyage from Llanelly, Glamorgan to Cherbourg, Manche, France. She was towed in to Plymouth, Devon by the pilot cutter No. 4 (United Kingdom).
Dallam Tower	United Kingdom	The steamship departed from New Orleans, Louisiana, United States for Sydney, Nova Scotia, Canada. No further trace, reported missing.

== 8 September ==
List of shipwrecks: 8 September 1882
Ship	State	Description
Brighton	United Kingdom	The paddle steamer ran aground off Beachy Head, Sussex. Her 80 passengers were taken off. She was on a voyage from Brighton to Eastbourne. Brighton was refloated and taken in to Shoreham-by-Sea, where she was repaired.
Shannon	United Kingdom	The barque was wrecked at the mouth of the River Plate.
Three unnamed vessels	Flags unknown	The ships were wrecked at the mouth of the River Plate.

== 9 September ==
List of shipwrecks: 9 September 1882
Ship	State	Description
Agnes	United Kingdom	The sloop struck the wreck of Brothers (United Kingdom) and sank off Piel Island, Lancashire. Agnes was on a voyage from Liverpool, Lancashire to Dromore, County Down.
Gypsy	France	The barque ran aground on the Dragør Sands, in the Baltic Sea. She was on a voyage from Sundsvall, Sweden to . She was later refloated with the assistance of a steamship and taken in to Copenhagen, Denmark.
Harvest Home	United Kingdom	The schooner was run into by the steamship Marie (United Kingdom) and sank in the River Thames at Erith, Kent. Her crew were rescued.
Marathon	United Kingdom	The ship was sighted in the Atlantic Ocean whilst on a voyage from Bombay, India to Bremen, Germany. No further trace, reported missing.
Mobile American	United States	The steamboat was blown ashore in Dog Island Harbor, 1/2 nautical mile (930 m) from the west end of James Island, Florida.

== 10 September ==
List of shipwrecks: 10 September 1882
Ship	State	Description
Elizabeth Middleton	United Kingdom	The schooner sprang a leak and was beached near Whitehaven, Cumberland, where she became a wreck. She was on a voyage from the River Duddon to Bowling, Dunbartonshire.
Llama	United Kingdom	The barque foundered in the Atlantic Ocean (8°52′S 32°04′W). Her crew survived. She was on a voyage from Liverpool, Lancashire to Callao, Peru.
Noorwaarts	Sweden	The barque was driven ashore. She was on a voyage from Piteå to Flensburg, Germany. She was refloated and taken in to Kalmar in a leaky condition.
St. Joseph	United Kingdom	The ship was driven ashore and wrecked 5 nautical miles (9.3 km) west of Hartland Point, Devon. Her crew survived.

== 11 September ==
List of shipwrecks: 11 September 1882
Ship	State	Description
Jylland	Denmark	The schooner collided with the brig Mona (Norway) and was severely damaged. Jylland was on a voyage from Kronstadt, Russia to Grangemouth, Stirlingshire, United Kingdom. She put in to Copenhagen for repairs.
Peruvienne	Norway	The barque ran aground on Lappen, Denmark. She was on a voyage from Sundsvall, Sweden to Rochefort, Charente-Inférieure, France.
Scotia	United Kingdom	The schooner sprang a severe leak and was beached at Kingscross, Isle of Arran. She was on a voyage from Ballina, County Mayo to Liverpool, Lancashire.

== 12 September ==
List of shipwrecks: 12 September 1882
Ship	State	Description
Attilo	Italy	The barque ran aground and sank at Fleetwood, Lancashire, United Kingdom.
Patrick Henry	United Kingdom	The ship ran aground at Fleetwood.
HMS Phoenix	Royal Navy	HMS Phoenix The Doterel-class sloop-of-war was wrecked on East Point Reef, Prince Edward Island, Canada. Her crew abandoned her on 14 September without loss of life.
Reine des Anges	France	The fishing schooner was wrecked on the Middle Cross Sand, in the North Sea off the coast of Norfolk, United Kingdom with the loss of ten of her eighteen crew. Survivors were rescued by the steamship Hamburg (Germany).

== 13 September ==
List of shipwrecks: 13 September 1882
Ship	State	Description
Formica	Norway	The barque ran aground at Huelva, Spain.
Hardware	United Kingdom	The ship was run into by Wansfel (United Kingdom and sank in the Bristol Channel 2 nautical miles (3.7 km) off Flat Holm, Glamorgan. Hardware was on a voyage from Newport, Monmouthshire to Queenstown, County Cork.
Reine Des Anges	France	The fishing boat sank on the Middle Ross Sands off Great Yarmouth, Norfolk, United Kingdom with the loss of six of her fourteen crew.

== 14 September ==
List of shipwrecks: 14 September 1882
Ship	State	Description
Anniversary	United Kingdom	The barque was abandoned in the Bay of Biscay. Her crew were rescued by the steamship Edinburgh (United Kingdom). Anniversary was on a voyage from Cardiff, Glamorgan to Demerara, British Guiana.
Asia	Canada	The steamship sank near Lonely Island in Georgian Bay with the loss of 123 lives. Only two passengers survived.
Unnamed	Flag unknown	The brigantine foundered in the Bristol Channel off Monkstone, Glamorgan.

== 15 September ==
List of shipwrecks: 15 September 1882
Ship	State	Description
Yorkshire	United Kingdom	The steamship was driven ashore in "Hultaw Bay", China.

== 16 September ==
List of shipwrecks: 16 September 1882
Ship	State	Description
Commodore	(United Kingdom of Great Britain and Ireland) Jersey	The schooner sprang a leak and foundered 6 nautical miles (11 km) west south west of the Eddystone Lighthouse, Cornwall. All on board were rescued by the pilot cutter Leader (United Kingdom). Commodore was on a voyage from Port Talbot, Glamorgan to Saint-Malo, Ille-et-Vilaine, France.

== 18 September ==
List of shipwrecks: 18 September 1882
Ship	State	Description
Hardware	United Kingdom	The ship collided with the steamship Wans Fell (United Kingdom) and sank in the Bristol Channel. Her crew were rescued by Wans Fell. Hardware was on a voyage from Newport, Monmouthshire to Queenstown, County Cork.

== 19 September ==
List of shipwrecks: 19 September 1882
Ship	State	Description
Wesleyana	United Kingdom	The smack was driven ashore and wrecked at Tintagel, Cornwall. Her crew were rescued.

== 21 September ==
List of shipwrecks: 21 September 1882
Ship	State	Description
Edam	Netherlands	The steamship was run into by the steamship Lepanto (United Kingdom) and sank off Sandy Hook, New Jersey, United States (41°08′N 66°59′W) with the loss of two of the 75 people on board. Edam was on a voyage from New York, United States to Amsterdam, North Holland and/or Rotterdam, South Holland.
Hringhorn	Sweden	The ship struck rocks at Dingle Point. She capsized as the tide ebbed. She was on a voyage from Garston, Lancashire, United Kingdom to Uddevalla.
Planet	United States	The schooner was sunk in a collision off the Seguin Lightouse, Maine. Her crew were rescued.

== 22 September ==
List of shipwrecks: 22 September 1882
Ship	State	Description
Antilles	United Kingdom	The steamship struck a rock off Tobago and was damaged. She was on a voyage from London to the West Indies.
British King	United Kingdom	The steamship was driven ashore at Mayapore, India.
Clan Campbell	United Kingdom	The steamship ran aground and was wrecked at Baie du Cap, Mauritius. She was on a voyage from Cape Town, Cape Colony to Mauritius. She broke in two in November, the stern section sank.
Ganges	United Kingdom	The steamship ran aground on the Cockburn Reef, in the Torres Strait She was refloated and taken in to Cooktown, Queensland.
Kelso	United Kingdom	The steamship was run into by the steamship Cyprus (United Kingdom) and was beached at Riga, Russia.

== 23 September ==
List of shipwrecks: 23 September 1882
Ship	State	Description
Achilles	United Kingdom	The steamship struck rocks off Salter Island, County Waterford and was beached at Waterford. She was on a voyage from Riga, Russia to Waterford.
Dunand	United Kingdom	The barque ran aground off Magdalena, Argentina. She was on a voyage from Glasgow, Renfrewshire to Buenos Aires, Argentina.

== 26 September ==
List of shipwrecks: 26 September 1882
Ship	State	Description
Rose	United States	The steamship ran onto an uncharted rock between Error Island (57°00′33″N 135°19′15″W) and Bridarlin Island, approximately 4.5 nautical miles (8.3 km; 5.2 mi) from Sitka, Department of Alaska. She was refloated with assistance from USS Wachusett (United States Navy). Later repaired and returned to service.

== 29 September ==
List of shipwrecks: 29 September 1882
Ship	State	Description
Anna Johanna	Germany	The ship departed from Peterhead, Aberdeenshire, United Kingdom for Libava, Courland Governorate. No further trace, reported missing.
Comet	Netherlands	The steamship collided with the steamship Calvilla (United Kingdom) and sank in the Mediterranean Sea 20 nautical miles (37 km) east of Gibraltar. Her 23 crew were rescued by Calvilla. Comet was on a voyage from Bari, Italy to Amsterdam, North Holland.
Robert E. Lee	United States	The steamboat caught fire and sank on the Mississippi River whilst on a voyage from New Orleans, Louisiana to Vicksburg. Twenty passengers and crew lost their lives.

== 30 September ==
List of shipwrecks: 30 September 1882
Ship	State	Description
Cape Comorin	United Kingdom	The ship was sighted off Rathlin Island, County Antrim whilst on a voyage from Glasgow, Renfrewshire for Buenos Aires, Argentina. No further trace, reported missing.
Ortolan	Canada	The ship departed from Tralee, County Kerry for Ardrossan, Ayrshire, United Kingdom. No further trace, reported missing.

== Unknown date ==
List of shipwrecks: Unknown date in September 1882
Ship	State	Description
Achilles	United Kingdom	The steamship was driven ashore on Ven, Sweden. She was on a voyage from Workington, Cumberland to Riga, Russia. She was refloated and resumed her voyage.
Adelina	Germany	The galiot was driven ashore and wrecked at Thisted, Denmark. She was on a voyage from "Morrisonhaven", United Kingdom to Lemvig, Denmark.
Clara	United Kingdom	The ship was driven ashore and wrecked at "Kongoni" before 22 September. She was on a voyage from the Natal Colony to Kongoni.
Crosby	United Kingdom	The steamship was wrecked off Cabo Carvoeiro, Portugal.
Emma	Flag unknown	The ship was lost at sea. She was on a voyage from Aspinwall, United States of Colombia to a port in the Gulf of Mexico.
Fermina	Spain	The barque was driven ashore at Cienfuegos, Cuba.
Florence	United Kingdom	The steamship was driven ashore at Legerstad, Öland, Sweden. She was on a voyage from Riga to Southampton, Hampshire. She was later refloated and taken in to Helsingør, Denmark for repairs.
Huascar	Brazil	The steamship exploded and sank with the loss of two of her crew.
Idaho	United States	The barque was driven ashore at Cienfuegos.
Lobna	United Kingdom	The steamship ran aground at Burntisland, Fife. She was refloated and found to be severely leaky.
Nuphar	United Kingdom	The ship was driven ashore at the entrance to the Townsends Inlet. She was on a voyage from Newcastle upon Tyne, Northumberland to Philadelphia, Pennsylvania, United States.
Orient	United States	The full-rigged ship foundered off Ship Island, Mississippi in a hurricane.
Patriot	United Kingdom	The tug was driven ashore at Tynemouth, Northumberland. She was refloated on 10 September and taken in to the River Tyne.
Ranelagh	New South Wales	The steamship was wrecked near Port Denison, Queensland before 20 September.
Sorato	Spain	The barque was driven ashore at Cienfuegos.
