= SM U-20 (Austria-Hungary) =

Lead boat of U-20 class

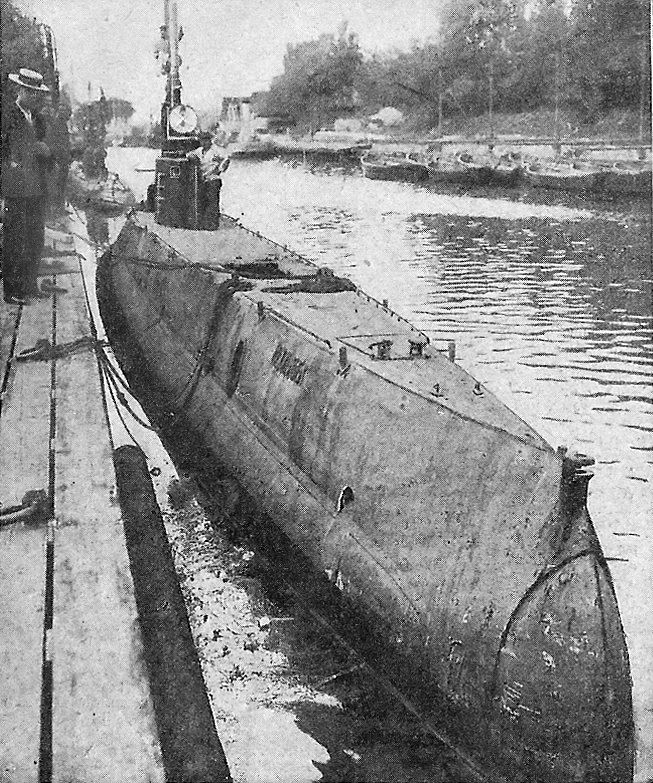
- The design for U-20 was based on that of the Havmanden class built for the Royal Danish Navy (Havmanden pictured)

History

Austria-Hungary
- Name: SM U-20
- Ordered: 27 March 1915
- Builder: Pola Navy Yard, Pola
- Laid down: 29 September 1915
- Launched: 18 September 1916
- Commissioned: 20 October 1917
- Fate: Sunk, 4 July 1918, raised and partially scrapped in 1962, remaining parts donated to museum

Service record
- Commanders: Klemens Ritter von Bezard; 28 May 1916 – 14 April 1917; Franz Rzemenowsky von Trautenegg; 28 July – 29 November 1917; Hermann Rigele; 29 November 1917 – 11 March 1918; Ludwig Müller; 11 March – 4 July 1918
- Victories: None

General characteristics
- Class & type: U-20-class submarine
- Displacement: 173 t, surfaced; 210 t, submerged
- Length: 127 ft 2 in (38.76 m)
- Beam: 13 ft (4.0 m)
- Draft: 9 ft (2.7 m)
- Propulsion: 1 × shaft; 1 × diesel engine, 450 bhp (340 kW); 1 × electric motor, 160 shp (120 kW)
- Speed: 12 knots (22 km/h) surfaced; 9 knots (17 km/h) submerged
- Range: 1,400 nautical miles (2,600 km) at 10 knots (19 km/h) surfaced; 23 nautical miles (43 km) at 8 knots (15 km/h) submerged
- Complement: 18
- Armament: 2 × 45 cm (17.7 in) torpedo tubes (both in front); 2 torpedoes; 1 × 66 mm (2.6 in) deck gun; 1 × 8 mm (0.31 in) machine gun

SM U-20 or U-XX was the lead boat of the U-20 class of submarines or U-boats built for and operated by the Austro-Hungarian Navy (German: Kaiserliche und Königliche Kriegsmarine or K.u.K. Kriegsmarine) during the First World War. The design for U-20 was based on that of the submarines of the Royal Danish Navy's Havmanden class (which had been designed by Whitehead & Co. in Fiume), and was largely obsolete by the beginning of the war.

U-20 was just over 127 feet (39 m) long and was armed with two bow torpedo tubes, a deck gun, and a machine gun. U-20 had no wartime successes and was sunk in early July 1918 by the Italian submarine F12. The wreck of U-20 was located in 1962 and salvaged. A portion of her conning tower is on display in a military museum in Vienna.

== Design and construction ==
When it became apparent to the Austro-Hungarian Navy that the First World War would not be a short war, they moved to bolster their U-boat fleet by seizing the plans for Denmark's Havmanden class submarines, which had been designed by Whitehead & Co. in Fiume, who had built three units. Although the Austro-Hungarian Navy was not happy with the design, which was largely obsolete, it was the only design for which plans were available and which could be begun immediately in domestic shipyards. The Austro-Hungarian Navy unenthusiastically placed orders for U-20 and her three sister boats on 27 March 1915.

U-20 was one of two boats of the class to be built at the Pola Navy Yard. Due to demands by the Hungarian government, subcontracts for the class were divided between Hungarian and Austrian firms, but this politically expedient solution worsened technical problems with the design and resulted in numerous modifications and delays for the class in general.

U-20 was a coastal submarine that displaced 173 tonnes (191 short tons) surfaced and 210 tonnes (231 short tons) submerged and was designed for a complement of 18. She was 127 feet 2 inches (38.76 m) long with a beam of 13 feet (4.0 m) and a draft of 9 feet (2.7 m). For propulsion, she featured a single propeller shaft, a single 450 bhp (340 kW) diesel engine for surface running, and a single 160 shp (120 kW) electric motor for submerged travel. She was capable of 12 knots (22 km/h) while surfaced and 9 knots (17 km/h) while submerged. Although there is no specific notation of a range for U-20, the Havmanden class, upon which the U-20 class was based, had a range of 1,400 nautical miles (2,600 km) at 10 knots (19 km/h), surfaced, and 23 nautical miles (43 km) at 8 knots (15 km/h) submerged.

U-20 was armed with two 45 cm (17.7 in) torpedo tubes located in the front and carried a complement of two torpedoes. She was also equipped with a 66 mm (2.6 in) deck gun and an 8 mm (0.31 in) machine gun.

U-20 was laid down on 29 September 1915, six months after she was ordered, and was launched on 18 September 1916.

== Service career ==
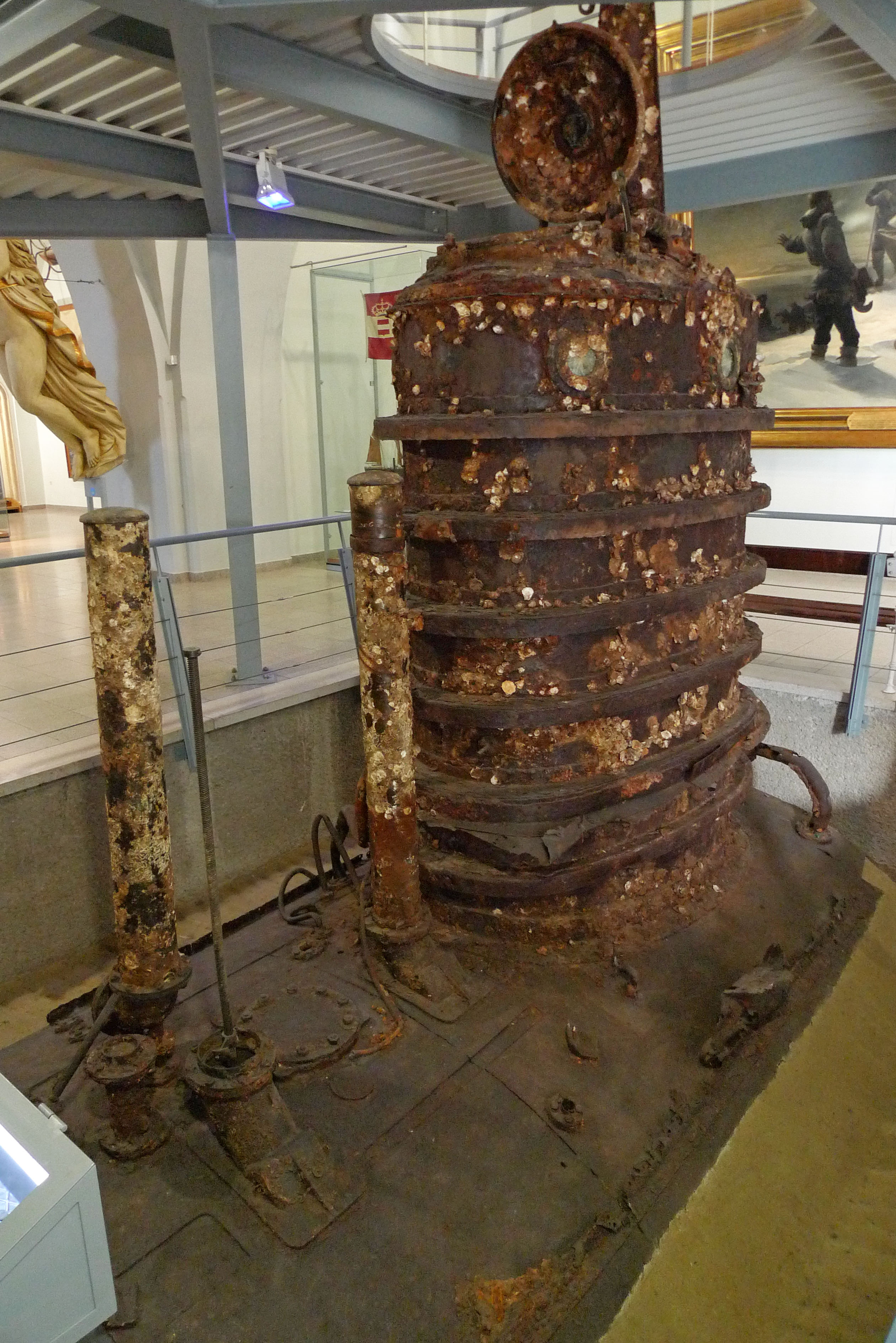
The conning tower of U-20 on display at the Heeresgeschichtliches Museum in Vienna

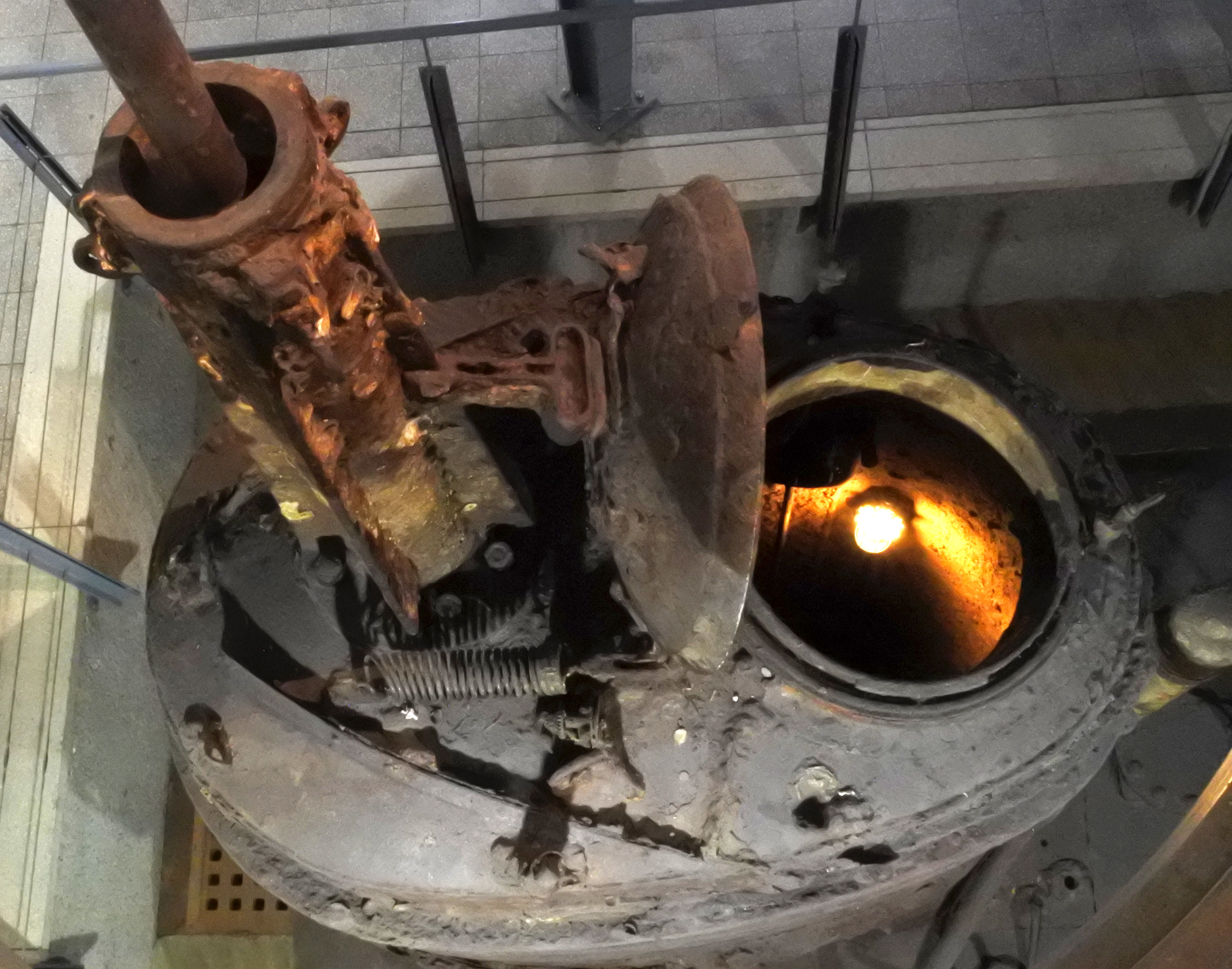
Details of U-20 conning tower.

Upon completion, U-20 began diving trials. On her 15 March 1917 trial, she was accidentally rammed by Admiral Spaun in the Fasana Channel. The collision with the Austro-Hungarian light cruiser twisted U-20's periscope, extensively damaged the conning tower, and knocked off her deck gun. After seven months of reconstruction, U-20 was commissioned into the Austro-Hungarian Navy on 20 October.

After initially operating from Pola, U-20 was transferred to Trieste in February 1918. Over the next three months, the U-boat patrolled in the northern Adriatic between the Tagliamento estuary and Venice. U-20 had an encounter with an enemy submarine on 7 April but was not able to launch a successful attack. On 3 July, Linienschiffsleutnant Ludwig Müller sailed U-20 out from Trieste for the Gulf of Venice. A day later, U-20 was spotted by the Italian submarine F12, which was on patrol in the northern Adriatic. F12 initially pursued U-20 underwater, and then on the surface. At a range of 650 yards (590 m), F12 torpedoed U-20 at position 45°29′N 13°05′E, sinking her with all hands. There was no wreckage on the surface, only an oil slick. (Note: Grant (p. 163) gives the date of U-20's loss as 4 July 1918. Compton-Hall (p. 235) reports it on 9 July, while Baumgartner and Sieche report it on 6 July. For Baumgartner and Sieche, see excerpt here (reprinted and translated into English by Sieche). Retrieved 29 November 2008.) Like all of her sister boats, U-20 had no wartime successes.

== Wreck ==
In mid-1962, the wreck of U-20 was discovered in the northern Adriatic. Italian salvage crews raised the boat's rear portion on 22 July and her front section on 21 November. The conning tower and a small midships section of U-20 were donated to the Heeresgeschichtliches Museum in Vienna, where they are on display, while the rest of the boat was scrapped. The remains of the crewmen were buried on the grounds of the Theresian Military Academy at Wiener Neustadt.

== Bibliography ==
- Baumgartner, Lothar; Erwin Sieche (1999). Die Schiffe der k.(u.)k. Kriegsmarine im Bild = Austro-Hungarian warships in photographs (in German). Wien: Verlagsbuchhandlung Stöhr. ISBN 978-3-901208-25-6. OCLC 43596931.
- Compton-Hall, Richard (2004) [1991]. Submarines at War, 1914–18. Penzance: Periscope Publishing. ISBN 978-1-904381-21-1. OCLC 57639764.
- Gardiner, Robert; Gray, Randal, eds. (1985). Conway's All the World's Fighting Ships 1906–1921. Annapolis, Maryland: Naval Institute Press. ISBN 978-0-87021-907-8. OCLC 12119866.
- Grant, Robert M. (2002) [1964]. U-boats Destroyed: The Effect of Anti-submarine Warfare, 1914–1918. Penzance: Periscope. ISBN 978-1-904381-00-6. OCLC 50215640.
- Halpern, Paul G. (1994). A Naval History of World War I. Annapolis, Maryland: Naval Institute Press. ISBN 978-0-87021-266-6. OCLC 28411665.
