= Alexandria Port =

Port of Alexandria
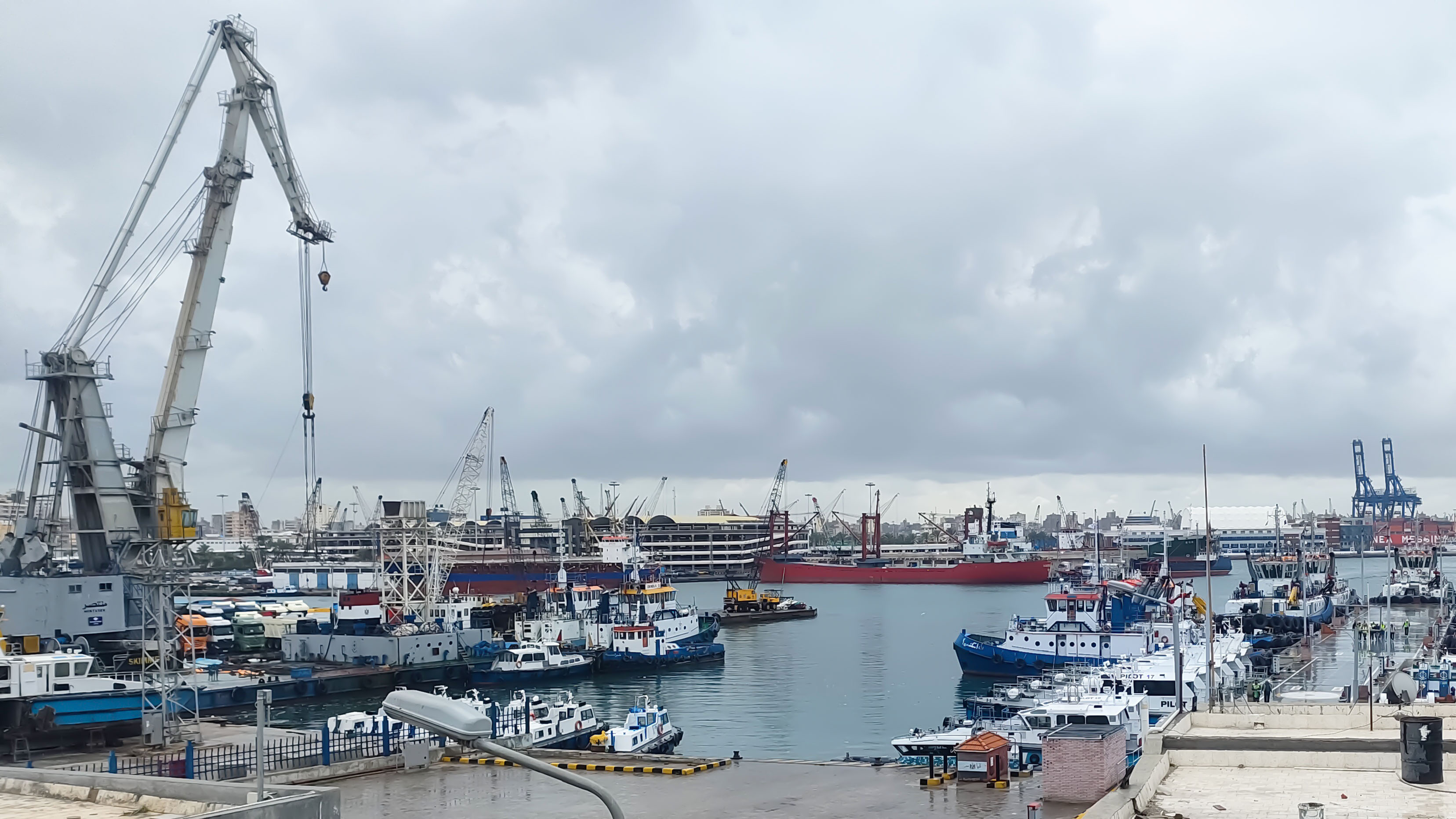
- General view of Alexandria port
- Interactive map of Port of Alexandria

Location
- Country: Egypt
- Location: Alexandria
- Coordinates: 31°12′16″N 29°52′48″E
- UN/LOCODE: EGALY

Details
- Opened: 1900 BC
- Operated by: Alexandria Port Authority
- Type of harbour: Coastal breakwater
- Size of harbour: 16 square kilometres (6.2 mi^{2})
- Land area: 22.8 square kilometres (8.8 mi^{2})
- No. of berths: 67

Statistics
- Annual cargo tonnage: 17,627,762 (2012)
- Annual container volume: 1,442,712 (2012)
- Website; Official website

The Port of Alexandria is located on the northern coast of Egypt, to the West of the Nile Delta. In antiquity Alexandria was built between the Mediterranean Sea and Mariut Lake. The latter was connected to the River Nile via canals, allowing goods at the Port to travel to and from the country's interior.

Alexandria is now considered the second most important city in Egypt and the Port of Alexandria is the main port in the country. It consists of two harbours (East and West) separated by a T-shaped peninsula. The East harbour is shallow and is not navigable by large vessels. The West harbour is used for commercial shipping. The harbour is formed by two converging breakwaters.

== History ==
=== Ancient times ===
Alexandria Port is one of the oldest ports in the world. The earliest port facilities were built in 1900 BC in the then-village of Rhakotis, to service coastal shipping and supply the island of Pharos (now part of the "Ras al-Tin" quarter).

Plan of Alexandria c. 30 BC

Over the centuries sand and silt deposits made the port unnavigable. It was cleared by forces under the command of Alexander the Great in 331 BC as part of the construction of Alexandria city to be the marine base for his fleet. Alexander's engineer Dinocrat linked the port of Alexandria and the island of Pharos with a bridge 1200 meters long and 200 meters wide, creating two harbour basins for commercial and military shipping. The northeast basin (Portus Magnus, currently the Eastern harbour) was designed for military vessels and the southwest basin (Portus Eunostus, currently the main port of Alexandria) was for commercial use. In the Ptolemy era a second bridge was built to Pharos, further dividing the eastern harbour into two separate inlets.

According to Strabo, Alexandria had an inland harbour on Lake Mareotis as well as the harbours on the Mediterranean. The lake had no mouth connecting it to the sea but was instead connected to the Nile by canals. Strabo describes the lake harbour as being busier than the harbours on the sea. During the period of Roman Egypt, grain was exported in large quantities from the city's Western Harbour, earning it the name "Portus Magnus". The grain was brought down the Nile by barge and stored in large granaries near the shore of Lake Mareotis before shipping. At the height of the Roman Empire, Alexandria was shipping 83,000 tons of grain per year to Rome. By the time of the late Empire, the city was shipping 220,000 tons of grain per year to Constantinople.

=== Modern era ===
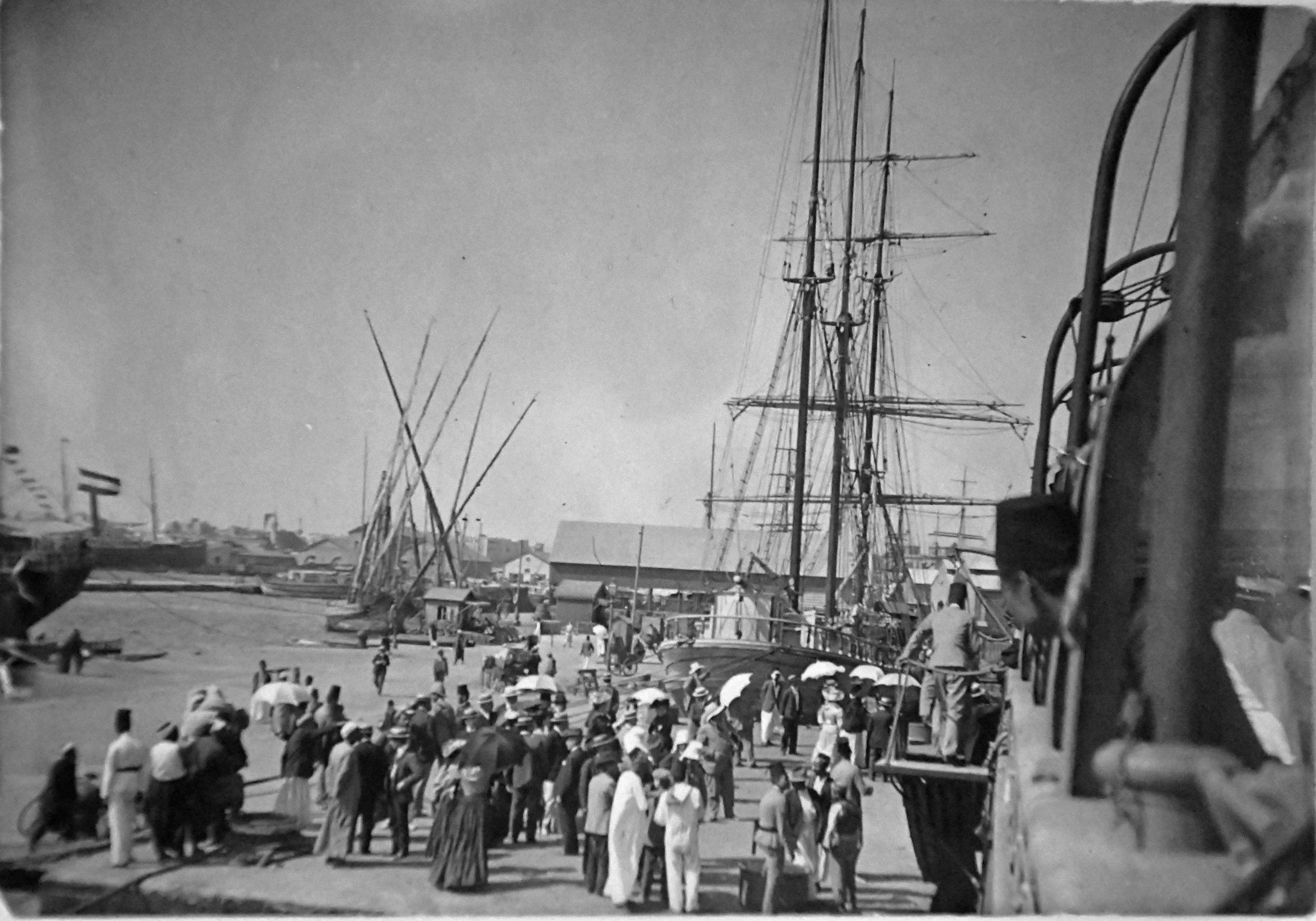
View of the port of Alexandria in 1905, photographed from the steamship the Nile shortly before departure.

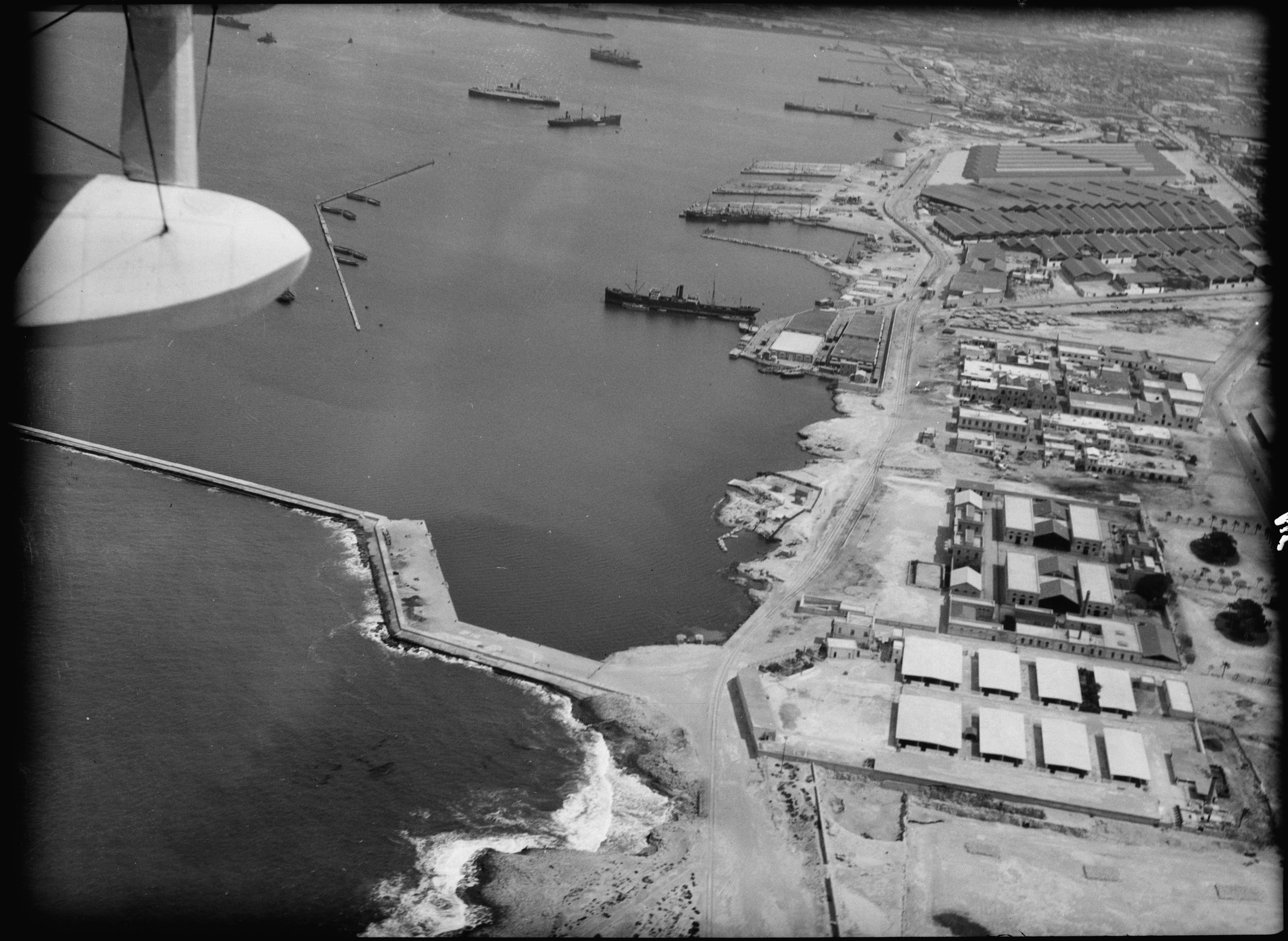
Alexandria port in 1932

The ancient port was renovated by Muhammad Ali of Egypt in his efforts to revive Alexandria which had been reduced to a small fishing village by the late medieval era. Muhammad Ali issued the order to restore and partly retrace the freshwater canal from the Nile upon his ascension to power. On its completion in 1820 it was named the Mahmoudiyah Canal. Under Muhammad Ali's rule, Alexandria shipyard was founded.

During World War I, the British Mediterranean Expeditionary Force that took part in the Gallipoli Campaign used the established port of Alexandria as its main base for troops and supplies bound for the landing at Cape Helles.

By the late 20th century sea trade through the Port of Alexandria was exceeding its capacity. A new port was built at El-Dekheila during the 1980s with facilities for container shipping and infrastructure to serve the nearby steel factory. In addition to the Port of Dekheila and the Western Port of Alexandria, the city's ports include those at Abu Qir and Sidi Krer, as well as Alexandria's old Eastern Port which is no longer used for shipping freight.

The Alexandria Shipyard was originally developed in the 1960s with assistance of the government of the Soviet Union and in 2004 the shipyard ownership was transferred to the Ministry of Defense

Egypt has a total of 15 commercial ports along the Mediterranean and Red Sea coasts. Alexandria Port, controlled by the Alexandria Port Authority, is the country's largest and it handles approximately 55% of Egypt's international trade. Overall Alexandria's various harbours handle over three quarters of Egypt's foreign trade, with nearly 80% of the country's imports and exports passing through the city.

== Geography ==
The western port is divided into several zones:

1. Used for general cargo handling.
2. Deals with four types of activities: unified cargoes including a Ro Ro and passenger terminal, stuffed bulk cargoes, and barge discharge.
3. Used for handling general cargo and barge discharge.
4. Used for handling containers, cement, coal, barge discharge, fertilizers, and general cargo.
5. Used for handling: molasses, timber, some types of general cargoes, barge discharge, grains and flour.
6. (Oil Dock): Situated at the western boundaries of the port, is used for handling edible oil, oil products and for providing bunkers. It also includes berths used for handling livestock. The port does not include oil storage facilities, but oil berths are connected to a refinery through a 2 km long pipeline.

== See also ==
- Transportation in Alexandria
