= HMS Ledbury (L90) =

Destroyer of the Royal Navy

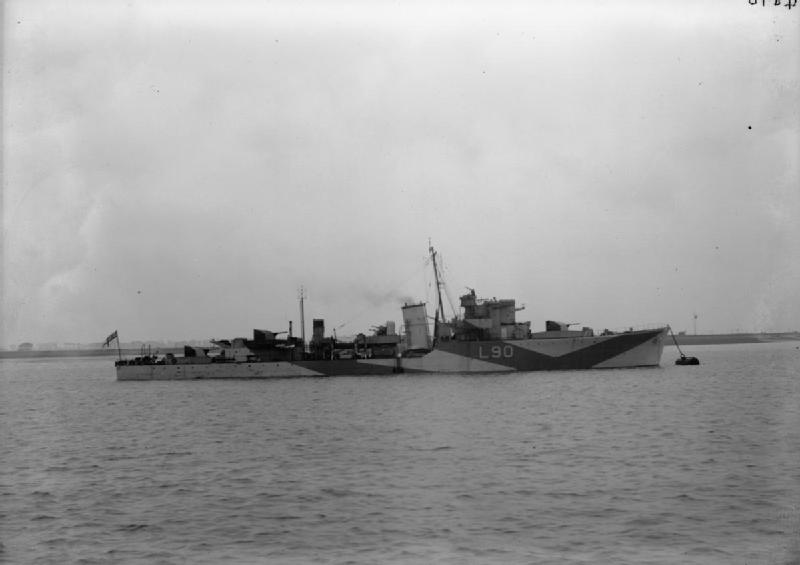
- HMS Ledbury at a buoy at Sheerness.

History

United Kingdom
- Name: HMS Ledbury
- Ordered: 3 September 1939
- Builder: J I Thornycroft Ltd
- Laid down: 24 January 1940
- Launched: 27 September 1941
- Identification: Pennant number: L90
- Honours and awards: Malta (1942) & (1942), Arctic (1943), Sicily (1943), Salerno (1943), Adriatic (1944), Aegean (1944).
- Fate: Scrapped at Rosyth in April 1958
- Notes: Sailed in convoys PQ 12, PQ 13, PQ 14, PQ 15, PQ 16, PQ 17, QP 9, QP 10, QP 15, JW 51A, JW 51B, JW 52, RA 51 & RA 53.

General characteristics
- Class & type: Type II Hunt-class destroyer
- Displacement: 1,050 tons standard; 1,430 tons full load
- Length: 85.3 m (280 ft)
- Beam: 9.6 metres (31 feet 6 inches)
- Draught: 2.51 metres (8 feet 3 inches)
- Propulsion: 2 Admiralty 3-drum boilers, 2 shaft Parsons geared turbines, 19,000 shp
- Speed: 27 kn (50 km/h; 31 mph) (25.5 kn (47.2 km/h; 29.3 mph) full)
- Range: 3,600 nmi (6,670 km) at 14 knots (26 km/h)
- Complement: 164
- Armament: 6 × QF 4 in Mark XVI on twin mounts Mk. XIX; 4 × QF 2 pdr Mk. VIII on quad mount MK.VII; 2 × 20 mm Oerlikons on single mounts P Mk. III; 110 depth charges, 2 throwers, 3 racks

HMS Ledbury was an escort destroyer of the Hunt class Type II. The Royal Navy ordered Ledbury's construction two days after the outbreak of the Second World War and J. I. Thornycroft Ltd laid down her keel at their Southampton yard on 24 January 1940. Air raid damage to the yard delayed her construction and she did not launch until 27 September 1941. Her initial assignment was to perform escort duties between Scapa Flow and Iceland. She remained in this theatre for the first part of the war, during which time she served with the ill-fated Arctic convoy PQ 17 in June 1942, from which twenty-four ships were lost.

Only two months later she took up the role of close escort in the Pedestal convoy to Malta. During the fierce attacks that dogged the convoy, Ledbury claimed three enemy aircraft destroyed and five damaged, and was one of three destroyers that helped the crippled oil tanker Ohio into the Grand Harbour. She added to her battle honours with the Allied landings in Sicily, Salerno, and operations in the Adriatic and Aegean. The Royal Navy finally scrapped Ledbury in 1958.

== Early service record ==
=== The Arctic convoy PQ 17 ===
Ledbury was engaged in escorting major warships and Fleet auxiliaries in the North Sea until late June 1942, when she was attached to the ocean escort of the convoy PQ 17. Mariners that took part in convoys delivering supplies to Russia remember vividly the biting cold and the continual fear of attack by air or sea. The supplies were vital in that they were needed to keep Russia in the war following her invasion by German forces in 1941. The PQ 17 convoy, which left Iceland at the end of June 1942, is known particularly for the tremendous losses among the merchant ships.

The problems for convoy PQ 17 started early on the morning of 4 July 1942, with the appearance of a copper-yellow warhead of a torpedo, clearly visible just below the surface of the sea. The freighter Carlton sounded her siren to warn the leading ships in column eight, but it was too late: the weapon was heading straight for the midship section of the Liberty ship Christopher Newport, at the head of that column.

The ship's Armed Guard ordered the machine guns to be turned on the torpedo racing towards them. Newport's merchant seamen loading the guns lost their nerve and scrambled to the ship's port side. One gunner remained at his post, directing bullets at the torpedo; but these were deflected by the water. The torpedo slammed into the ship's engine-room, tearing a gaping hole and knocking the steering gear out of action with an enormous explosion. The helpless ship was yawing out of control across the sixth and seventh columns of the convoy, narrowly missing collisions with other ships, before she lurched round in the opposite direction to that of the convoy and slowed to a standstill. The surviving ships rolled past her, and the convoy sped on in the fog. Christopher Newport (code-number in the convoy, 'Penway' ) wirelessed the leading ship HMS Keppel: 'Hit by aerial torpedo.' The Convoy Commander, Jack Broome, ordered Ledbury, HMS Leamington and HMS Poppy to '... take all possible action to keep U-boats down.' Ledbury was one of the ships chosen to stay behind to tend to, and if necessary scuttle, the torpedoed ship and they themselves could have been an easy target to any submarines; however, none of the U-boats had maintained contact with the convoy.

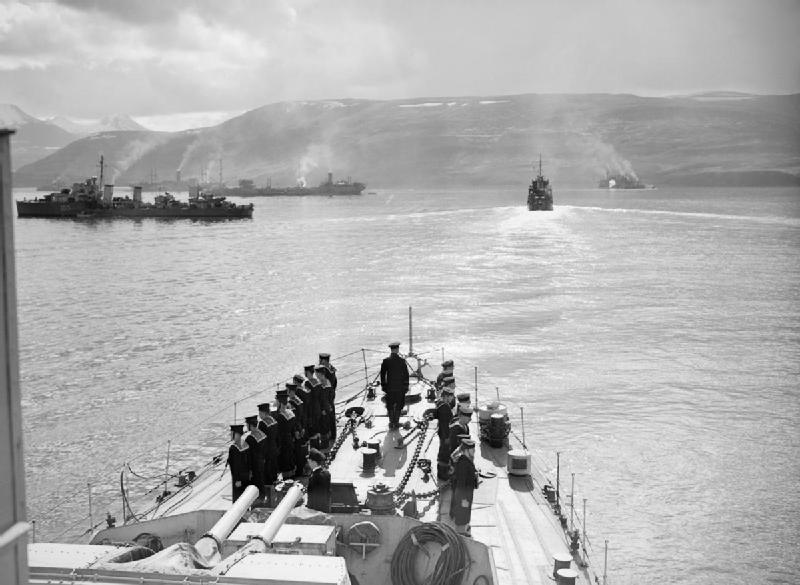
Escorts and merchant ships at Hvalfjord before the sailing of Convoy PQ 17

The next front action for Ledbury came later on that day, at 08:20, when the destroyer began signalling, 'Eight air torpedo-bombers 210 degrees, five miles', and then two minutes later, 'for eight read ten'. Suddenly after Ledbury's signals, all the escorts seemed to be blinking morse-signals at once. The loudspeakers were booming, 'Bombers approaching ... there's six of them ... there's twelve ... there's eighteen ... good God, there's twenty-five!' The anti-aircraft ship lurched forward and altered course to head off the attack. Commodore Dowding signalled Keppel to ask if the convoy should make an 'emergency turn'; but it was deemed too late for such a manoeuvre, since half the ships would most likely miss the signal altogether and Broome flashed back, 'I do not think it worth it.' The developing air attack spotted by Ledbury turned into a blitz of the convoy, with Luftwaffe aircraft being shot down over the formation, and one plane crashed into the sea about four thousand yards from the destroyer USS Wainwright, on the convoy's starboard bow. The crash occurred not far from Ledbury and seamen on board saw four German airmen climbing out into a rubber dinghy with the bomber sinking soon after. The pilot, Lieutenant Kaumeyr, and his three crewmen were picked out of their dinghy by Ledbury. The attack however, continued and throughout the fierce fighting the escorts distinguished themselves by screening the merchantmen from many attacks, especially U-boat sorties; Ledbury alone had sighted seven.

The Admiralty believed that the convoy faced an imminent attack from elements of the German Kriegsmarine, possibly a combined attack of the commerce raiding capital ships Admiral Hipper, Tirpitz, Admiral Scheer and the Lützow. A series of signals were issued to the convoy, culminating in an order to 'scatter' to Soviet ports. In order to protect the convoy the destroyers and cruisers, believing that they were steaming to intercept a larger force, headed west thereby abandoning the merchantmen. Broome led his six destroyers round at twenty knots, and headed off in line ahead to join a number of cruisers and destroyers racing off to the south-west into a wall of fog. By 11:00, his destroyers were drawing very close to the cruisers. The destroyer HMS Wilton signalled Ledbury, 'How fast are you going?' Ledbury replied, 'Full ahead.' However the threat posed by the capital ships failed to materialise and the scattered merchant ships came under U-boat and Luftwaffe attack, resulting in the sinking of twenty three ships. As well as the loss of precious lives and supplies, there was widespread bitterness and the recriminations reverberated for many months, as stated by the commander of Ledbury, Roger P. Hill:

There were twenty-three ships sunk in that PQ 17, one-hundred-ninety seamen killed, four-hundred or five-hundred aircraft were lost, about three-hundred tanks and a hundred thousand tons of war material. That's what resulted from that Admiralty signal. It was really terrible, even now I have never got over it, because for the Navy to leave the Merchant Navy like that was simply terrible. The American cruiser people ashore, of course they just said 'The Limeys are yellow' and they all had fights and had to have leave on different nights and so on, and Tirpitz was not within 300 or 400 miles of the convoy. She came out eventually, but not that day, the next day I think, or the following day. She was sighted by a submarine which made a signal, the Germans intercepted that signal and called her straight back to harbour. There was no threat to the convoy at all except from the air and all these poor merchant ships, one merchant ship signalled 'I can see seven submarines approaching me on the surface' and there was continual air attack. It was simply awful...

— Roger Hill, commanding officer HMS Ledbury (30 December 1941 – August 1942), 1996 Interview.

== Pedestal and Ledbury ==
=== Background and preliminary movements ===
In 1942, Great Britain was waging war against Italian forces in North Africa and their allies, the Afrika Korps. Malta was critical to this campaign During this stage of the war, Malta was critically short on munitions, food and aviation fuel. Attempts to run the blockade and resupply Malta proved to be a failure; previous convoys such as Harpoon (from Gibraltar) and Vigorous (from Alexandria, Egypt) had lost most of their merchantmen and their escorts had been damaged. A new convoy was hence planned for mid-August, and named Pedestal.

On 9 August 1942, Ledbury sailed from Gibraltar, sighted the convoy in the afternoon, and took its convoy screening station. An hour before midnight on 10 August she left the convoy and proceeded to refuel from the tanker Dingledale, an operation that took place early in the morning of 11 August. Ledbury took aboard 101 tons of fuel. Just before ten o'clock in the morning, the destroyer took station as starboard wing ship of screen. In the afternoon, HMS Eagle was hit by torpedoes, with Derwent ordering Ledbury to stand by the stricken aircraft carrier. As Eagle sank, one destroyer and the tug Jaunty stopped, picking up survivors in the oil patches in the water. As Ledbury reached survivors, she was ordered to rejoin the convoy. The convoy now suffered a series of aerial attacks with the gunner of Ledbury's port Oerlikon thought to have shot down one plane, although many other ships were firing at this machine. At 21:00, Ledbury was ordered to Anti-Aircraft station, with one cable on the starboard beam of No. 43. Early on the morning of 12 August, the destroyer was ordered by HMS Nelson to investigate a periscope reported on the starboard quarter of No.43. Nelson reported a submarine periscope bearing north of her, and Ledbury deployed single scare charges to cover HMS Indomitable from this submarine, and destroyers astern of her appeared to follow up this contact. At nine o'clock in the morning, an air attack by Junkers 88s developed on the convoy, with one Junkers Ju 88 crashing at bearing 058 degrees. Four small bombs were seen to go by the bridge, landing on the starboard side, and a large bomb came near the port quarter. In the ensuing mayhem, Ledbury was ordered to fill in gaps in the screen caused by ships falling back on contact. On the way to this position three airmen were seen coming down by parachute. One was picked up and found to be German, the others were abandoned. The captured airman stated that the last raid consisted of Luftwaffe airmen flying Junkers 88s from Sicily; and that he had been shot down by close range weapons from the convoy. Ledbury's crew noted that the most interesting thing about the pilot was that the nails of his boots were made of wood. Yet another aerial attack ensued, this time by dive-bombers. Two groups approached from ahead, but neither got over the convoy. Two of these planes were shot down by gunfire. After this attack, the destroyer resumed station on the starboard side of the convoy. An attack by Junkers 88s soon started whilst escort fighters were still refuelling. Ledbury suffered another near miss off her port quarter. One ship in the convoy was damaged, and HMS Bramham stood by her.

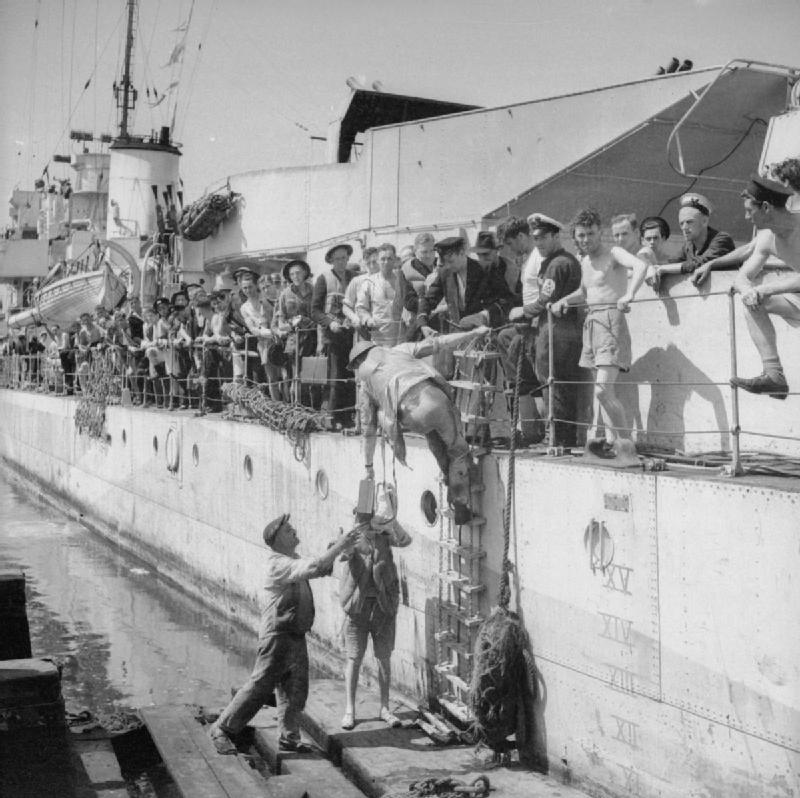
Survivors from merchant ships disembark from HMS Ledbury at Malta

The convoy now continued on its route, harassed and attacked at each step of its journey; it soon encountered submarines. One was forced to surface astern and it was sunk by a Tribal-class destroyer. A Junkers Ju 87 dropped parachute mines, all of which fell clear. Twelve torpedo bombers approached from the starboard side but these were turned away by gunfire. At the same time, Junkers Ju 87s carried out dive-bombing attacks, and HMS Indomitable was hit. At 19:00, Force "Z", (the battleships, the aircraft carriers, and three cruisers), retired from the convoy. Fifty minutes after Force Z turned back, the convoy was in the process of forming two lines with the three T.S.D.S. destroyers ahead, and the remaining ships in their Anti-Aircraft stations in the column of the convoy. A signal, "Form two columns" was still flying, but most ships were anticipating the movement and moving to their new positions. Four minutes before 20:00, HMS Nigeria and HMS Cairo and the tanker Ohio were torpedoed. The convoy carried out an emergency turn to starboard, and most destroyers turned back to stand by the damaged cruisers. Ledbury was in station on the starboard side of the convoy – about half way up two columns roughly formed with HMS Manchester, HMS Kenya and HMS Pathfinder ahead.

A cruiser reported aircraft detected by R.D.F on the port bow of the convoy and Ledbury was taken through the convoy to get to the engaged side; but a heavy and sustained attack by Junkers 88s dive bombing developed when the destroyer was still in between the two columns. The attack became increasingly indefensible; two ships were hit, one exploded, the other remained afloat but both were creating a huge mass of burning petrol on the water. Torpedo planes were now sighted on the starboard bow very close, but the light was failing quickly. Ledbury engaged the torpedo planes, but one delivered a very good attack, dropping two torpedoes. Another ship exploded, and Captain Hill assumed that Brisbane Star was torpedoed at this time. Ledbury called Manchester to make sure that she was standing by the damaged ships; the destroyer sighted six ships out in the darkness steaming on various courses, mostly in a north or north-western direction. The destroyer called up the nearest ship and ordered course 120. This ship was Melbourne Star. The orders were repeated to the nearest merchantmen. Ledbury then returned to Ohio intending to take her in tow, but the tanker reported that she could steam with her steering aft but had no compass. The destroyer switched on a brighter stern light and told the tanker to follow her to Malta. Ledbury informed stragglers of the presence of a minefield near Zembra, while she also contacted HMS Penn that the survivors from the damaged ships had not been picked up and that she was going on with the tanker. It seemed to the crew that a very long time had passed before the ships were clear of the glare of the burning ships. During the night, Ledbury sighted four E-Boat wrecks just around the next corner (These were sighted at 02:04, 03:32, 03:45 and 04:31 respectively).

=== Rescue operations ===
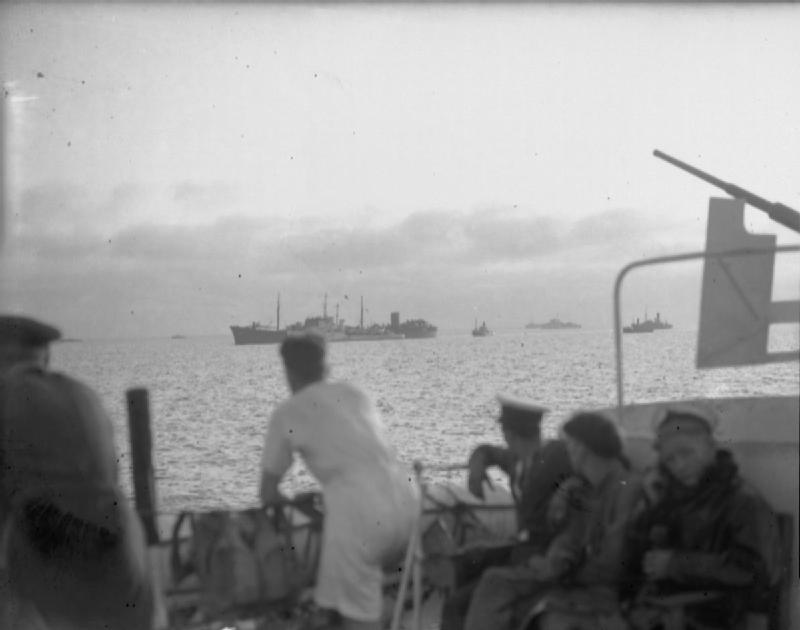
The destroyer Ledbury alongside the damaged tanker Ohio

On 13 August, after sighting a small patrol boat, three abandoned merchant ships were passed, some of them close by with boats showing flares. The convoy was sighted early in the morning, with the destroyer leading the tanker in astern of the line. The destroyer then informed the Convoy Commander of the tanker's condition. Torpedo planes flew in to distract attention from Junkers Ju 88s which were coming in from a height. The convoy had detected these by R.D.F but could not sight them and the escorts were slow in opening fire on them. Waimarama was hit, probably by about three or four bombs, and blew up with a tremendous explosion leaving "a great pylon of flame on the sea". Ashanti signalled Ledbury to pick up survivors. The destroyer went to the scene, but it was originally thought impossible that anyone could survive such a terrific explosion and mass of flames, but on approaching, men were seen in the water. The destroyer entered the inferno, and after manoeuvring around the debris field the destroyer picked up forty-four survivors, and one body was buried that evening with military honours. Some time later it was discovered that Ledbury had on board survivors from both Waimarama and Melbourne Star. This happened because when Waimarama blew up it happened so suddenly that Melbourne Star passed right through the flames. Those aft on board Melbourne Star thought that their own ship had gone up and had jumped over the side. By half past-nine Ledbury had completed the recovery of survivors. By this time the Commander estimated that the destroyer was about thirty miles astern of the convoy, which meant that they had to speed up in order to reach the ships. Captain Hill then sent a message to Admiral Burrough, 'Interrogative STOP rejoin or go home'. When the signal rating brought in Burrough's reply it became apparent that the signal groups had been received corruptly, since the admiral was apparently ordering Ledbury to "proceed to the Orkney and Shetland Islands". After considering the signal, Captain Hill assumed that it plainly intended the destroyer to return to Gibraltar, however that he might be forgiven for not interpreting it correctly, and so Ledbury ignored the signal and set course for Ohio.

Ledbury found Ohio with Penn standing by Dorset and Bramham dropping depth charges. The remnants of the convoy were about ten miles away, under attack from the air. Just as Captain Hill suggested to Penn to take Ohio in tow, Ledbury received a signal from the Convoy Commander to stand by Manchester in the Gulf of Hammamet. In view of the delay in signals, and as Penn and Bramham were standing by these two ships, Ledbury proceeded at 24 knots (44 km/h) to look for Manchester, which according to the signal given by S.O. Cruiser Force had a flooded engine room and was ablaze. As the destroyer searched for the missing ship, it had passed alongside the wreckage of Almeria Lykes, and it had also shot down two three-engined Savoia-Marchetti bombers. After making landfall and identifying a headland as Ras-Mahmur, course was set to follow the coastline looking for Manchester. When the destroyer was almost certain that Manchester was not in the bay, the coast was closed in case there might be any survivors on the beach. At this moment, the signal station at Neboel started calling up "VHM – VHA" but Ledbury did not reply. The signal station at Hammamet made a flag signal, "show your signal letters". The destroyer hoisted an Italian group consisting of flag " I " and three other flags tied in knots so as to be unreadable. This apparently satisfied the shore station as they hoisted a large French ensign. During this period Ledbury was showing no ensign and no Italian ensign was carried on board. The destroyer carried on down the coast until it was twelve miles (19 km) south of Hammamet. During this time there were enemy reports of a cruiser near Zembra and also that two destroyers were making for Pantelleria.The destroyer changed course to pass five miles south of Linosa, and she altered the course after dark in order to rejoin Ohio.

=== Ledbury and the Ohio ===
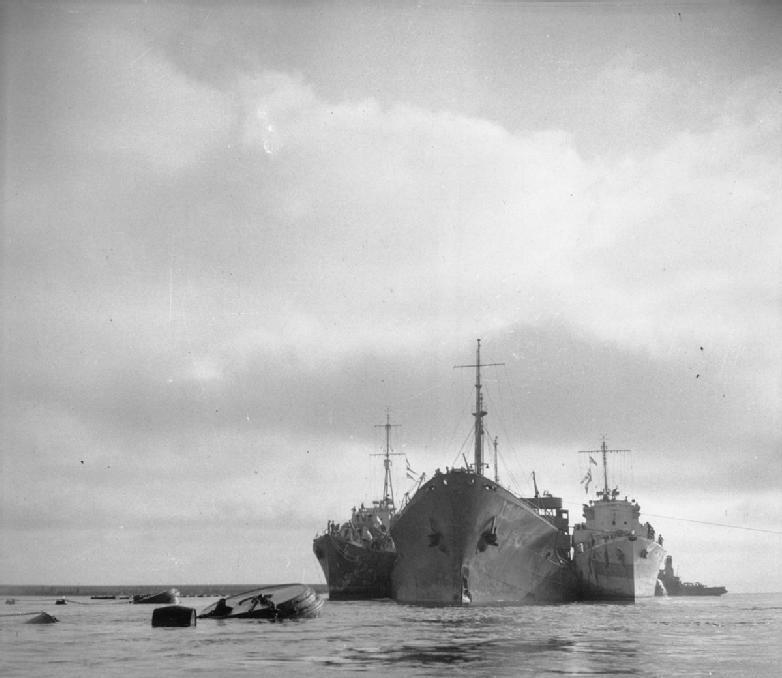
The damaged tanker, supported by Royal Navy destroyers

By 14 August Ohio was stopped with no hope of getting her engines going as she had been hit again whilst in tow of Penn. As Ledbury approached the estimated position of the tanker, the destroyer could find no sign of her. A little later, Commander Hill sighted gunfire ahead, and considering it to be Ohio's escorts beating off reconnaissance snoops, the destroyer turned course towards the flashes on the horizon. As Ledbury approached Ohio, it was seen that the tanker was lying deep in the water, with a bent line of deck. Here, Hill turned towards his number one and said ' It looks as though we're too late '.

A six-inch manilla rope was passed from the tanker's stern to the destroyer's midship oiling bollard, the idea being to take the stern to port, whilst the minesweeper HMS Rye towed her; but Ledbury put on too much weight and the minesweeper's tow parted. Penn then asked Ledbury to take the tanker in tow from ahead, which was done, using the tanker's tow and a shackle of Ledbury's towing hawser-cable. Rye took the destroyer in tow to keep the ship from falling off, whilst Penn went alongside the starboard side of the tanker to act as a drag to keep her straight. Ledbury's gunner, who was in charge of the towing party on board the tanker tried out all the tanker's guns, which proved valuable as at 10:44 the flotilla was attacked by nine Stukas. Just before the attack, American survivors from the merchantman Santa Elisa asked Commander Hill to take a party aboard Ohio to repair and man one of the anti-aircraft guns, an offer gratefully accepted by Ledbury's captain. In the attack, Ledbury received a near miss within a few feet of the fo'c'sle, which fortunately was an oil bomb and caused no casualties. There was also a near miss astern. Help was however on the way, since Malta based Spitfires covered the ships and broke many enemy formations. This was the last successful attack, and Ledbury, Penn and Bramham secured either side of the tanker, and by some very skilful seamanship and endurance on the part of the crews brought Ohio into Valletta Harbour.

== Further action ==
The action of Ledbury during Operation Pedestal was the pinnacle of an otherwise uneventful career. After Operation Pedestal Ledbury was involved in several other convoys throughout the latter stages of the Second World War. On 17 January 1943 Convoy JW 52 set sail with fifteen ships of Loch Ewe, with a Western close escort made up of the destroyers Ledbury, Middleton and Blankney, between 17 January and 21 January. Ledbury and the other destroyers left the convoy with the arrival of the Eastern escort, made up of the destroyers Onslaught, Beagle, Bulldog, Matchless, Musketeer, Offa and the Polish Piorun.

In June 1943 Ledbury proceeded again to the Mediterranean after further service on escort duties between Iceland and the Orkney Islands and took part in the invasion of Sicily, codenamed Operation Husky. During this operation, Ledbury formed part of Support Force East, in support of the troops of Forces N, B and V that formed XXX Corps. Ledbury was one of a group of upwards of fifty destroyers stationed to escort the landings' main force of cruisers.

She was also involved in the Salerno invasion in September 1943, but thereafter her main employment was as a convoy escort to the Italian front, based at first on Malta and latterly at Alexandria. Occasional offensive patrols in the Adriatic and Aegean were undertaken. Between 15 January and 12 February 1944 Ledbury was engaged in patrols along the supply lines of the Dalmatian coast, where heavy Axis losses were involved, becoming untenable due to the increased employment of Allied fighter-bombers from bases in Italy. Between 15 January and 16 January, the destroyers Ledbury and Blackmore bombarded Durazzo while other elements on the same patrol, were approaching Curzola.

After taking a minor covering role in the return of British troops to Athens in October 1944, Ledbury was reduced to reserve in March 1946, and was not again commissioned for active service, remaining in peacetime commission longer than most of her class, before being sold for scrap in 1958. The destroyer was broken up at Rosyth in April 1958.
