= MV Melbourne Star =

British refrigerated cargo liner

Coordinates: 28°05′N 57°30′W

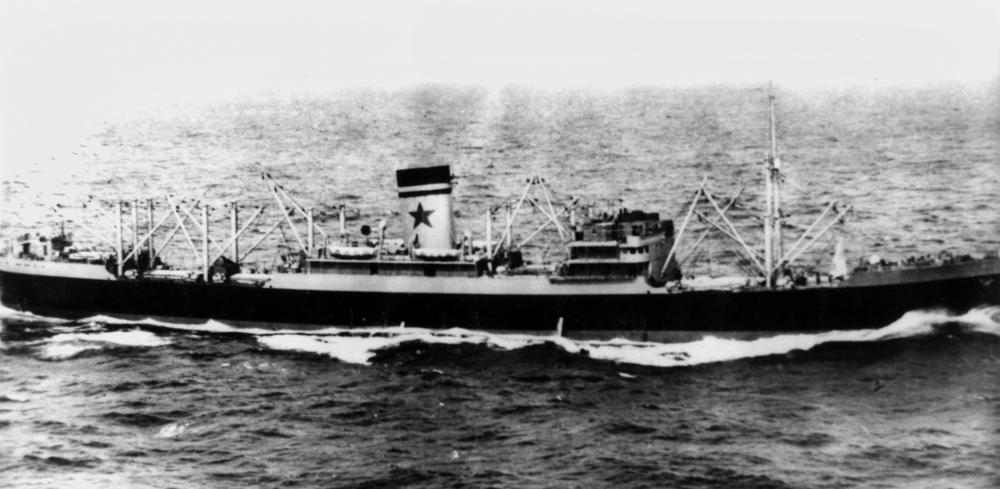
- Melbourne Star under way

History

United Kingdom
- Name: Melbourne Star
- Namesake: Melbourne, Victoria
- Owner: Union Cold Storage Co 1936–42; Frederick Leyland & Co 1942–43
- Operator: Blue Star Line
- Port of registry: London
- Builder: Cammell Laird, Birkenhead
- Yard number: 1014
- Launched: 7 July 1936
- Completed: November 1936
- Identification: UK official number 165326; Call sign GYZZ
- Fate: Sunk, 2 April 1943

General characteristics
- Type: refrigerated cargo ship
- Tonnage: 12,806 GRT; tonnage under deck 11,614; 7,964 NRT
- Length: 530 ft (160 m) p/p; 548.8 ft (167.3 m) o/a
- Beam: 70.4 ft (21.5 m)
- Draught: 43 ft 4 in (13.21 m)
- Depth: 32.2 ft (9.8 m)
- Installed power: 2,806 NHP
- Propulsion: 2 × 10-cylinder Sulzer Bros marine diesel engines; twin screws
- Crew: 76 crew + (in wartime) 11 DEMS gunners
- Sensors & processing systems: wireless direction finding; echo sounding device; gyrocompass
- Armament: DEMS
- Notes: sister ship: Brisbane Star

Service record
- Operations: Operation Substance, 1941; Operation Pedestal, 1942

MV Melbourne Star was a British refrigerated cargo liner. She was built by Cammell Laird and Co in 1936 as one of Blue Star Line's Imperial Star-class ships, designed to ship frozen meat from Australia and New Zealand to the United Kingdom. She served in the Second World War and is distinguished for her role in Operation Pedestal to relieve the siege of Malta in August 1942. She was sunk by torpedo in 1943 with the loss of 115 lives.

== Building ==
Cammell Laird and Co in Birkenhead, England built the sister ships Melbourne Star and Brisbane Star and launched them on the same day, 7 July 1936. Melbourne Star was completed in November 1936, followed by Brisbane Star in January 1937. Both ships were initially owned by Union Cold Storage, a ship-owning company controlled by Blue Star Line.

The Imperial Star class were motor ships. Melbourne Star and Brisbane Star each had a pair of 10-cylinder, two-stroke, single-acting Sulzer Bros marine diesel engines. Melbourne Star's engines developed a total of 2,806 NHP. Her navigation equipment included wireless direction finding, an echo sounding device and a gyrocompass.

== War service ==
On 5 October 1940 Melbourne Star was in the North Atlantic between 400 and 500 miles west of Achill Island in Ireland en route from Freetown, Sierra Leone to Glasgow, Scotland, when a Luftwaffe aircraft attacked her with several bombs. Only one hit the ship and it failed to explode. The aircraft then subjected the ship to cannon and machine gun fire, wounding an able seaman, L Williams, who later died. The ship was repaired and returned to service. Melbourne Star seems to have spent Christmas 1940 and New Year 1941 in Suez.

=== Operation Substance ===
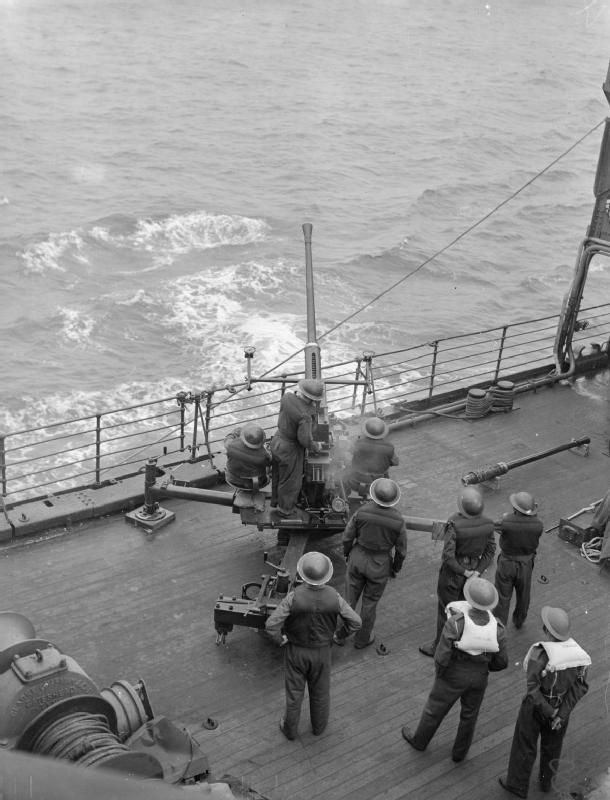
One of the additional Bofors 40 mm guns mounted aboard Melbourne Star in July and August 1942 for Operation Pedestal

In July 1941 Melbourne Star and another Blue Star Line Imperial Star-class ship, Sydney Star, were among six merchant ships that took part in Operation Substance to relieve the siege of Malta. The two Blue Star vessels and other merchant ships for the operation sailed from the Firth of Clyde on 12 July as part of Convoy WS 9C, which reached Gibraltar on 20 July. There they transferred to Convoy GM 1 which left for Malta the same day.

Melbourne Star's Master, Captain David MacFarlane, had already survived the sinking of Auckland Star in 1940 and was appointed Commodore of the Operation Substance convoy. During the voyage Melbourne Star was attacked in the Mediterranean by an E-boat on 24 July but reached Valletta safely. The operation's flag officer, Admiral Somerville, commended the six merchant ships for their "steadfast and resolute behaviour during air and E-Boat attacks" and singled out Captain MacFarlane "who set a high standard and never failed to appreciate directly what he should do".

Captain MacFarlane was one of two Merchant Navy officers from Operation Substance who in December 1941 were awarded the OBE for their bravery. The London Gazette reported that MacFarlane "set a high standard and it is largely due to his leadership that the operation was successful".

After Operation Substance Melbourne Star returned independently to Gibraltar and then crossed the Atlantic to Trinidad, where she arrived on 17 November 1941. Twelve days later she left and sailed independently back to Liverpool, where she arrived on 29 November. She seems to have spent Christmas 1941 and New Year 1942 in Liverpool, where she loaded a cargo for South Africa of armoured vehicles, motor transports, artillery, stores and two aircraft. She joined Convoy WS 15, which left on 10 January and reached Freetown on 25 January. Melbourne Star continued south, reaching Durban on 13 February.

Melbourne Star's movements for the next four months are not known. She may have sailed east across the Indian and Pacific Oceans, for she left Panama on 13 June 1942 and reached the Clyde a fortnight later.

=== Operation Pedestal ===
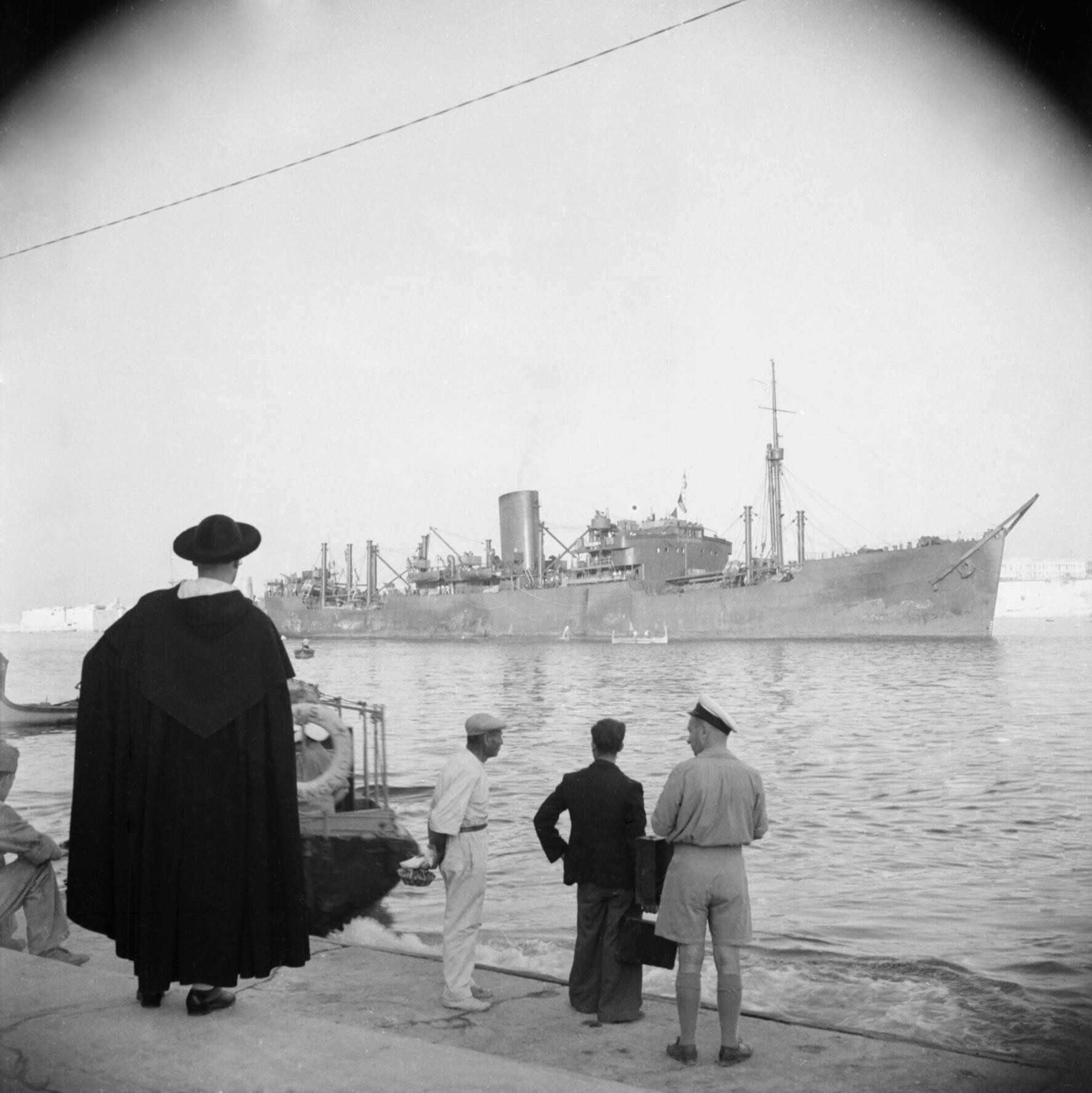
Spectators including a Roman Catholic priest watch Melbourne Star arrive in Valletta's Grand Harbour on 13 August 1942 in Operation Pedestal.

In August 1942 Melbourne Star again relieved the siege of Malta, sailing with her sister Brisbane Star in Operation Pedestal. Melbourne Star's cargo included 1,350 tons of kerosene, 1,450 tons of high-explosive shells and cartridges and drums containing several thousand tons of heavy oil. She also carried extra Bofors 40 mm guns as deck cargo to augment Malta's air defence, but mounted so that they could also supplement the convoy's air defence en route to Malta. The two Blue Star vessels and other merchant ships for the operation sailed from the Firth of Clyde on 2 August as part of Convoy WS 21S, which reached Gibraltar on 10 August. There they transferred to Convoy MW 12]] which left for Malta the same day.

At 0810 hrs 13 August twelve Junkers Ju 88 bombers attacked the refrigerated cargo ship Waimarama, which was immediately ahead of Melbourne Star. Waimarama was carrying aviation fuel and immediately burst into flames, showering Melbourne Star with débris including a piece of steel plate 5 feet (1.5 m) long. The base of a ventilator 2 1/2 feet (0.8 m) high hit and damaged one of Melbourne Star's machine gun posts. The bottoms of Melbourne Star's lifeboats were burnt to charcoal. The damage, fire and smoke were so close that many of Melbourne Star's crew assumed she had been hit and 36 of them leapt into the sea, although fuel on the surface of the sea was also on fire.

The Hunt-class destroyer HMS Ledbury entered the fire and smoke, rescuing 22 men from Melbourne Star and a few survivors from Waimarama. Nine of Melbourne Star's crew and five of her DEMS gunners were not found. Melbourne Star reached Grand Harbour, Valletta, later the same day. Twelve hours after entering port a 6-inch (150 mm) shell from Waimarama's cargo was found embedded in the deck above the captain's day cabin. It had been blown in the air when Waimarama exploded, smashed through the wooden surface of Melbourne Star's deck, embedded itself in the steel plate beneath but failed to explode.

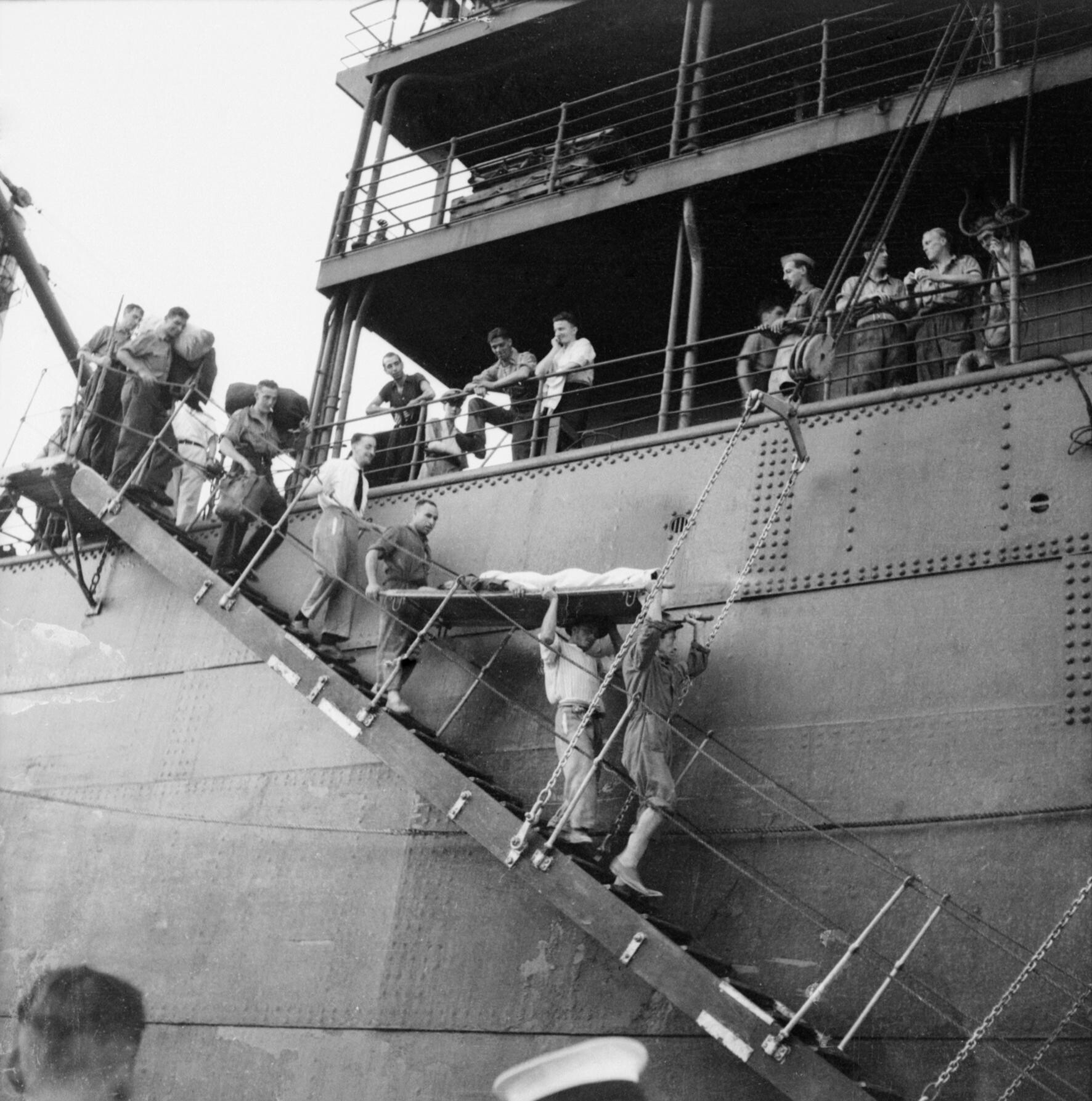
A seaman wounded in Operation Pedestal is stretchered ashore from Melbourne Star in Valletta, 13 August 1942.

Captain MacFarlane was one of three Merchant Navy captains from Operation Pedestal who shortly afterwards were awarded the DSO "for fortitude, seamanship and endurance... in the face of relentless attacks... from enemy submarines, aircraft and surface forces".

For their part in the Malta convoys chief officer Leslie Parsons and chief engineer Harry Blandford were awarded the DSC, and boatswain J Cook, chief steward Herbert O'Connor, lamp-trimmer Frederich McWilliam and able seamen James Fleming and Alexander Greenwood were awarded the DSM. petty officer H Ince was awarded the King's Commendation for Brave Conduct. second officer W.E. Richards, third officer G.D. Knight and chief refrigerating engineer C.W. Almond were mentioned in dispatches.

On 7 December 1942 Melbourne Star left Malta with Convoy ME 11, which reached Suez four days later. She seems to have passed through the Suez Canal and the Indian Ocean, for on 2 February 1943 she left Montevideo in neutral Uruguay for Liverpool, where she arrived on 22 February.

In 1943 Blue Star transferred her ownership from Union Cold Storage to Frederick Leyland and Co.

== Loss ==
On 24 March 1943 Melbourne Star left Liverpool for Sydney via the Panama Canal. She carried torpedoes, ammunition, other materiel, 76 crew, 11 DEMS gunners and 31 passengers. Melbourne Star's Master was now James Hall, who had commanded the liner Andalucia Star until she was sunk in October 1942. Several of his officers and men were veterans of Melbourne Star's participation in Operation Pedestal. Six other crewmen were survivors of another Imperial Star-class ship, Dunedin Star, which had been sunk in November 1942.

Approximate position of Melbourne Star's wreck in the North Atlantic

Half of Melbourne Star's passengers and several of her crew were from Australia or New Zealand, including five junior Royal Australian Navy officers, a RAAF wing commander and a young Roman Catholic priest. Two of Melbourne Star's crew and two of her passengers were from the Republic of Ireland. One passenger was a young woman from Dundee, Scotland, travelling with her two sons aged eight and four.

Melbourne Star started her Atlantic crossing from Liverpool with Convoy ON 175, which was bound for New York. En route she detached from the convoy to head for Panama. About 0300 hrs on 2 April Melbourne Star was in mid-Atlantic in heavy weather about 480 miles south-east of Bermuda when the German Type IXC submarine U-129 hit her with two or three torpedoes, one of which detonated in her boiler room. Part of her cargo detonated, destroying three-quarters of the ship instantly and sinking her within two minutes. There was no chance to transmit a distress signal, and if any of her four lifeboats survived the explosion there was no chance of anyone launching them.

But the ship also carried Carley floats, which were either thrown into the sea by the explosion or floated clear as the remains of the ship sank. Eleven people from the ship managed to find and board three of the floats: seven people in one, three crewmen in another and an engine room greaser, William Best, alone in a third.

At daybreak U-129 approached the floats. The Germans asked the survivors for the name of their ship and what its destination and cargo were. From one of the floats able seaman Leonard White replied, giving the ship's true name but claiming she was bound for Panama with "general supplies". U-129 then left them to fend for themselves.

A/B White shared a float with ordinary seaman Ronald Nunn and engine room greaser William Burns. At daybreak they sighted William Best alone in his float and the two paddled toward each other. White, Nunn and Burns transferred to Best's float. They sighted the float with seven occupants but could not reach it. It was never seen again. A/B White took charge of the party of four survivors and "was responsible for the intelligent planning of the rations and the morale of his shipmates which was excellent at all times".

Their float was stocked with biscuits, chocolate, Horlicks tablets, Bovril pemmican, 22 imperial gallons (100 litres) of water and 2 imperial gallons (9 litres) of massage oil for use against exposure. There was also a sail, which they rigged as a makeshift shelter. After three days of rough weather the sea calmed and the raft drifted. The men's health deteriorated, but the ration cans had keys to open them, and from one of these White improvised a fishing hook. He untwisted the fibres of a rope and made them into a fishing line. With this they caught about 50 fish, which they ate raw. This gave the survivors both protein and nutritious fish oil, which improved their health and did much to keep them alive.

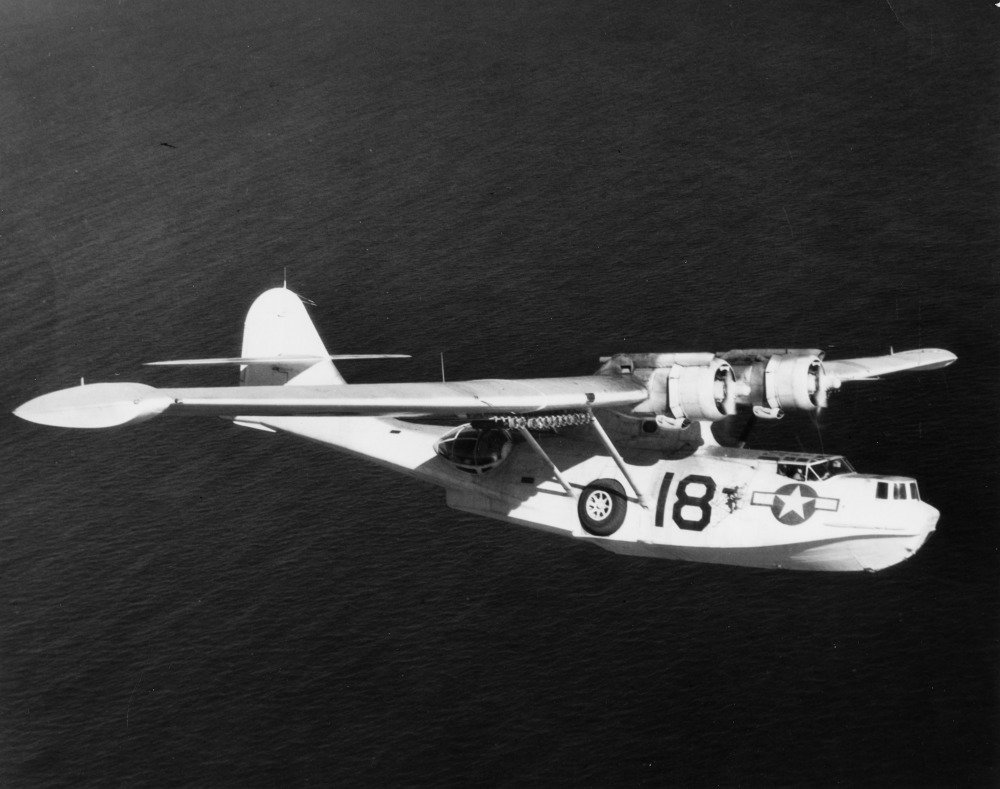
US Consolidated PBY Catalina flying boat

On 9 May a Consolidated PBY Catalina flying boat of US Navy Patrol Squadron 63 (VP-63) was on anti-submarine patrol when its crew sighted the raft about 250 miles off Bermuda. The plane circled overhead, touched down on the sea nearby and launched an inflatable boat, in which aircraft navigator Lieutenant Knox came over to the Carley float. The four survivors greeted Knox by offering him a fresh fish they had just caught.

The Catalina flew the four to Bermuda where they were admitted to a US Navy mobile hospital. All had developed saltwater sores but considering they had been adrift for 38 days they were in relatively good health. A/B White had lost only 15 pounds (7 kg) in weight in 38 days adrift, and on 28 May was passed medically fit to return to duty. The Catalina's crew, lieutenants Kaufmann, Rex Knorr and Elliott, received US Navy commendations for the rescue.

In August 1944 Best, Burns, Nunn and White were all awarded the BEM for displaying "outstanding qualities of courage, fortitude and endurance which enabled them to survive". The award came too late for Ronald Nunn, who had been killed on 10 June 1944 when the coaster Dungrange, carrying ammunition and fuel oil for the invasion of Normandy, was sunk in the English Channel off the Isle of Wight.

On 1 April 1943, the day before U-129 attacked Melbourne Star, an eastbound ship purporting to be the Portuguese four-masted 7,896 GRT cargo steamer Amarante had passed the cargo ship in mid-Atlantic. The Admiralty enquiry into the loss of Melbourne Star established that no Portuguese ship answering that description had been anywhere near that part of the Atlantic that day. It was therefore suspected that this was a Kriegsmarine merchant raider disguised as a neutral Portuguese ship, and that she had passed Melbourne Star's position and course to the BdU.

== Successor ships ==
After the War, Blue Star Line ordered three more Imperial Star-class ships from Harland and Wolff in Belfast to replace some of its war losses. They included a second Melbourne Star, which was launched on 10 August 1947 and completed in July 1948. Blue Star sold her in 1972 to Embajada Compania Naviera SS, who registered her in Greece and renamed her Melbo. Later that year she was sold to the Tung Cheng Steel and Iron Works of Taiwan, who scrapped her at Kaohsiung in 1973.

In 1971–72 Bremer Vulkan of Bremen-Vegesack built four container ships for ACT, a consortium of Blue Star, Port Line and Ellerman Lines. One was ACT4, which in 1992 was transferred to Blue Star's sole ownership and renamed Melbourne Star. In 1998 Blue Star became part of P&O Nedlloyd, who kept Melbourne Star under the same name and livery. In 2003 she was sold to shipbreakers in Shanghai to be scrapped.

== Postage stamp ==
On 10 August 2012, the 70th anniversary of Convoy MW 12's departure from Gibraltar, MaltaPost issued a 26-cent commemorative stamp bearing a picture of Melbourne Star entering the Grand Harbour. It is one of a set of 26-cent stamps issued that day, which between them commemorate every ship that took part in the convoy.

== Sources ==
- Dorling (pseud. Taffrail), Henry Taprell (1973). Blue Star Line at War, 1939–45. London: W. Foulsham & Co. ISBN 0-572-00849-X.
