= MV Waimarama =

UK refrigerated cargo liner

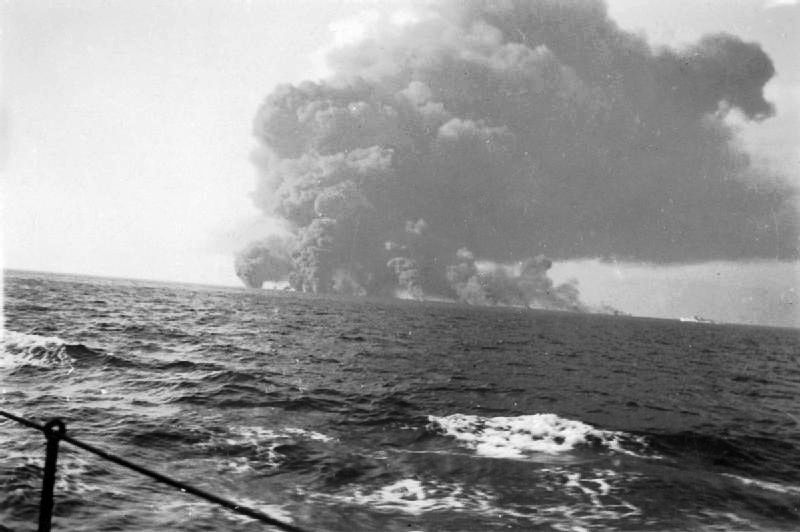
- The column of smoke after Waimarama exploded on 13 August 1942

History

United Kingdom
- Name: Waimarama
- Namesake: Waimarama, New Zealand
- Owner: Shaw, Savill & Albion Line
- Port of registry: Southampton
- Builder: Harland and Wolff, Belfast
- Yard number: 1004
- Launched: 31 May 1938
- Completed: 6 October 1938
- Identification: UK official number 166817; call sign GPGW
- Fate: destroyed by air attack, 13 August 1942

General characteristics
- Type: refrigerated cargo liner
- Tonnage: As built: 11,092 GRT, 6,672 NRT; 1940 onward: 12,843 GRT, 7,857 NRT
- Length: 516.9 ft (157.6 m)
- Beam: 70.4 ft (21.5 m)
- Draught: 27 ft 7 in (8.41 m)
- Depth: 32.3 ft (9.8 m)
- Decks: 3
- Installed power: 2,463 NHP (12,000 bhp)
- Propulsion: 2 × Diesel engines 2 × screws
- Speed: 18 knots (33 km/h)
- Capacity: 484,545 cu ft (13,721 m^{3}) refrigerated cargo; plus space for chilled cargo; 12 passengers
- Sensors & processing systems: wireless direction finding; echo sounding; gyrocompass
- Notes: sister ships: Waiwera, Waipawa, Wairangi

MV Waimarama was a UK refrigerated cargo liner. She was built in Northern Ireland for Shaw, Savill & Albion Line and launched in 1938. She carried perishable foods, particularly meat, from New Zealand to the United Kingdom.

Waimarama took part in Operation Pedestal in August 1942. A German aircraft bombed her before the convoy reached Malta. The ship exploded and sank with the loss of 83 of her crew.

== Precursors ==
Shaw, Savill and Albion ran passenger and cargo services between New Zealand and the UK via the Panama Canal. In the mid-1930s Harland and Wolff built for Shaw, Savill three of the swiftest cargo liners in the World: the refrigerated ships Waiwera launched in 1934, Waipawa launched a month later and Wairangi launched in 1935. They were motor ships, similar to Empire Star, New Zealand Star, Australia Star and Imperial Star that Harland and Wolff built for Blue Star Line around the same time.

Waiwera, Waipawa and Wairangi had capacity for just over 522,000 cubic feet (14,781 m^{3}) of refrigerated cargo, berths for 12 passengers and a deadweight tonnage of more than 13,000. They had a long accommodation block amidships that included not only their passengers' and officers' cabins but also quarters for their crew.

Their Burmeister & Wain marine diesel engines, which Harland and Wolff built under licence, gave them a speed of 17 knots (31 km/h). This made them as fast as many intermediate ocean liners of the time, and put them among the swiftest cargo liners in the World.

== Building Waimarama ==
Waimarama was a development of this successful design. Harland and Wolff designed her to the same dimensions as her three sisters, but with more powerful engines. Waimarama was 516.9 ft (157.6 m) long, had a beam of 70.4 ft (21.5 m) and draught of 27 ft 7 in (8.41 m). Her space for refrigerated cargo was 484,545 cubic feet (13,720.8 m^{3}), which was seven per cent less than her sisters, but that was because she also had a special section for chilled cargo.

As built, Waimarama's tonnages were 11,092 GRT and 6,672 NRT. In about 1940 they were revised to 12,843 GRT and 7,857 NRT.

For her 12 passengers Waimarama had eight single and two double cabins, a dining saloon, a smoke-room and a lounge. Crew quarters were amidships in two-berth cabins.

Harland and Wolff launched Waimarama on 31 May 1938 and completed her on 6 October that year. She had two screws, each driven by a six-cylinder two-stroke double-acting Burmeister and Wain diesel engine. Between them the two engines developed a total of 2,463 NHP. On her sea trials she achieved 20 knots (37 km/h), which was exceptionally fast for a cargo liner. Her service speed was 18 knots (33 km/h).

== Second World War ==
In the Second World War Waimarama seems to have voyaged mostly unescorted. The only convoys in which she is recorded are Convoy WS 5B from Liverpool to Freetown in Sierra Leone in February and March 1941 and a few convoys in summer 1942.

On 5 June 1942 Waimarama left Cristóbal at the Caribbean entrance of the Panama Canal in Convoy CS 5, which took her as far as Key West in Florida. There she joined Convoy KN 109 which took her up the east coast of the US as far as Hampton Roads between North Carolina and Virginia. On 23 June she left New York and crossed the North Atlantic unescorted to Liverpool, where she arrived on 4 July.

=== Operation Pedestal ===
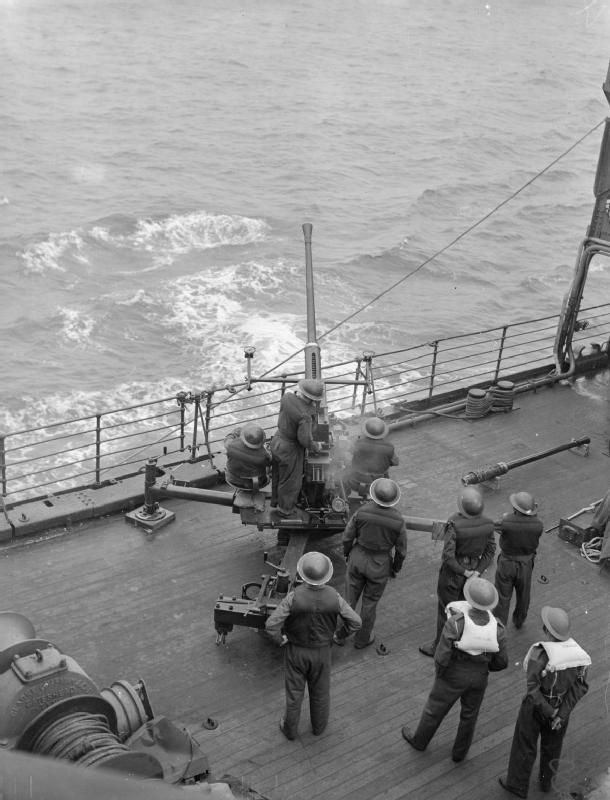
An additional Bofors 40 mm gun installed for Operation Pedestal on Melbourne Star, which sailed in the same convoy as Waimarama

In the war Waimarama had been converted into a defensively equipped merchant ship (DEMS). For a cargo ship that typically meant one 4-inch or 4.7-inch naval gun on the stern, a small number of machine guns for anti-aircraft cover and, on larger cargo ships such as Waimarama, possibly a 3-inch anti-aircraft gun as well.

However, in July 1942 ships selected for Operation Pedestal had their armament increased by the addition of either Oerlikon 20 mm cannons and/or Bofors 40 mm guns. Both Waimarama and her sister Wairangi were selected for Operation Pedestal. In July 1942 they would therefore have been fitted with extra anti-aircraft guns.

On 2 August 1942, 14 Allied merchant ships including Waimarama and Wairangi left the Firth of Clyde in Scotland in the heavily escorted Convoy WS 12S. On 10 August they reached Gibraltar where they became Convoy MW 12. From 11 August onward German and Italian aircraft, surface vessels and submarines repeatedly attacked the convoy.

=== Loss ===
Before dawn in the small hours of 13 August, Italian torpedo boats and German E-boats sank four merchant ships including Wairangi. Then at 0810 hrs Luftwaffe aircraft attacked the convoy east of Cape Bon, Tunisia and south of the Italian island of Pantelleria. A Junkers Ju 88 aircraft dropped a stick of bombs, three or four of which hit Waimarama. Waimarama's cargo included ammunition and her deck cargo included containers of aviation spirit. Within minutes she "blew up with a roar and a sheet of flame with clouds of billowing smoke". Burning fuel also covered the surface of the sea. 83 of Waimarama's complement were killed, including her Master.

Waimarama's crew had no time to launch any of her lifeboats. But some of her complement were blown into the water, and despite burning oil on the surface some of them survived. They included a 17-year-old cadet, Frederick Treves, who was on his first voyage, and an officer who could not swim. Treves kept the officer's head above water and then found a piece of wood which he gave to the officer to cling to, thereby saving his life.

Burning débris showered the Blue Star liner Melbourne Star, which was following immediately astern of Waimarama. The fire and smoke were so intense that many of the crew on the after part of Melbourne Star assumed she too had been hit. Despite the fuel burning on the surface of the sea, 36 of them jumped overboard.

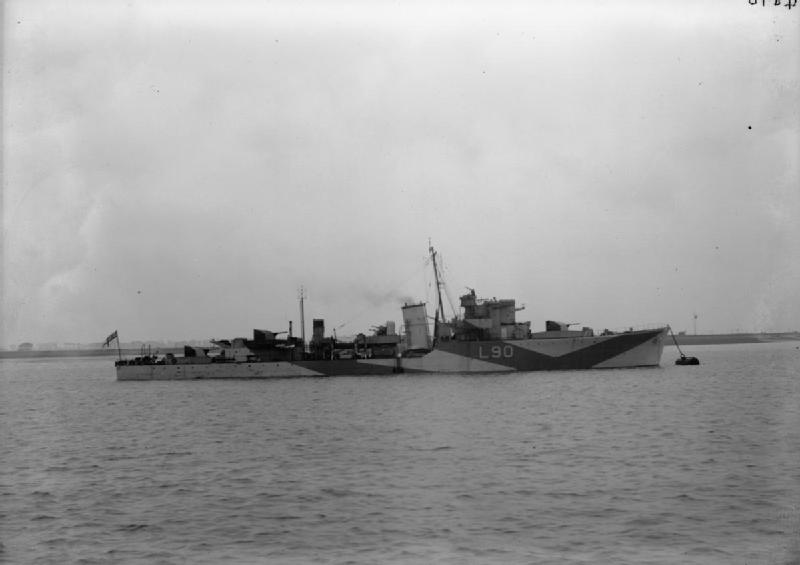
HMS Ledbury, which rescued survivors from Waimarama and Melbourne Star

The destroyer HMS Ledbury entered the field of burning débris and, at considerable risk to herself, rescued survivors of both ships from the water. Some sources state that only 22 men who jumped from Melbourne Star and two men who were blown overboard from Waimarama survived, while others state that Ledbury succeeded in rescuing 18 survivors from Waimarama and 24 from Melbourne Star.

By 0930 hrs Ledbury had completed rescuing survivors. She landed them on Malta on 15 August.

== Aftermath ==
The Shipwrecked Mariners Society granted each survivor from Waimarama £76 10s relief.

In February 1943 Waimarama's Master, Robert Pearce, DSC, and his Third Wireless Officer, John Jackson, were mentioned in dispatches "For gallantry, skill and resolution while an important Convoy was fought through to Malta in the face of relentless attacks by day and night from enemy aircraft, submarines and surface forces". Captain Pearce's award was posthumous.

Cadet Treves was awarded the BEM and Lloyd's War Medal for Bravery at Sea for saving the officer who could not swim.

Waimarama's wreck lies at 36°25′N 12°00′E, upright in 9 metres (30 ft) of water.

On 10 August 2012, the 70th anniversary of Convoy MW 12's departure from Gibraltar, MaltaPost issued a 26 cent commemorative stamp bearing a picture of Waimarama under way at sea. It is one of a set of 26 cent stamps issued that day, which between them commemorate every ship that took part in the convoy.

== Bibliography ==
- Crabb, Brian James (2014). Operation Pedestal: The story of Convoy WS21S in August 1942. England: Shaun Tyas. ISBN 978-1-907730-19-1.
- Dorling, Henry Taprell (pseudonym Taffrail) (1973). Blue Star Line at War, 1939–45. London: W. Foulsham & Co. ISBN 0-572-00849-X.
- Harnack, Edwin P (1938) [1903]. All About Ships & Shipping (7th ed.). London: Faber and Faber.
- Middlemiss, Norman (January 2019). "Waiwera, Waipawa and Wairangi: Shaw, Savill's 'W' and Improved 'W' Classes". Shipping Today and Yesterday (347). Tandy Media: 18–23.
- Nicol, Stuart (2001). MacQueen's Legacy; A History of the Royal Mail Line. Vol. One. Brimscombe Port and Charleston, SC: Tempus Publishing. ISBN 0-7524-2118-2.
- Talbot-Booth, EC (1942) [1936]. Ships and the Sea (Seventh ed.). London: Sampson Low, Marston & Co Ltd.
- Wilson, RM (1956). The Big Ships. London: Cassell & Co.
- Hastings, Max (2021). Operation Pedestal. London: William Collins.
