= MV Brisbane Star =

British cargo liner

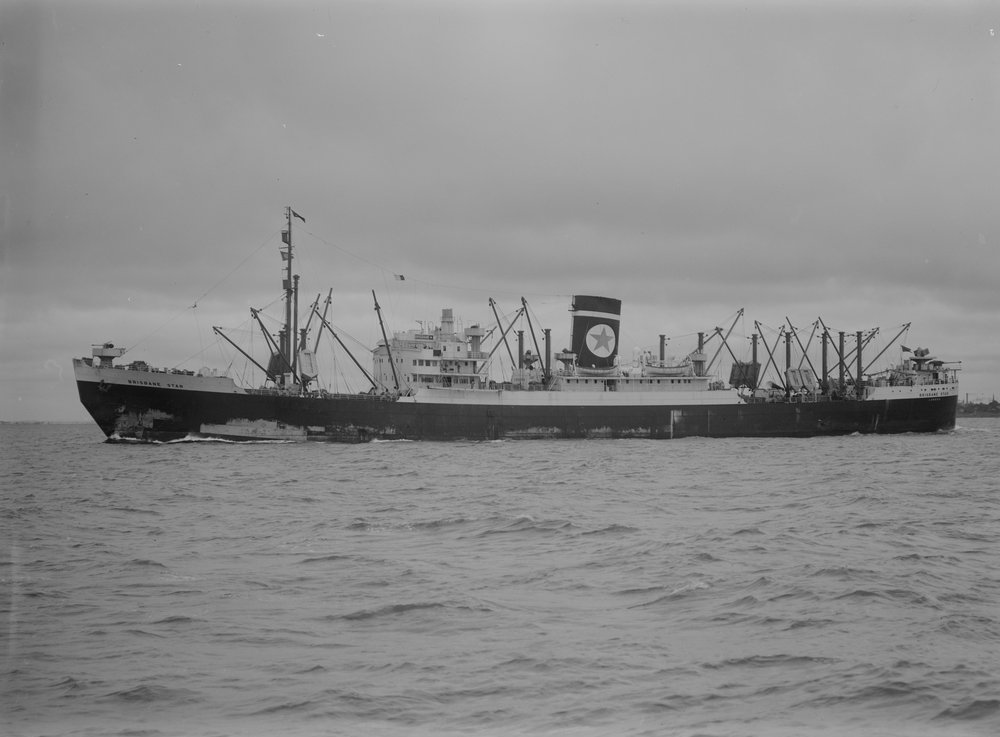
- Brisbane Star in the latter part of the Second World War

History

United Kingdom
- Name: Brisbane Star
- Namesake: Brisbane, Queensland
- Owner: Union Cold Storage Co 1937–42; Frederick Leyland & Co 1942–50; Lamport & Holt Line, 1950–59; Blue Star Line Ltd., 1959–63; Margalante Compania Naviera SA, 1963
- Operator: Blue Star Line (1937–63)
- Port of registry: (United Kingdom) London
- Builder: Cammell Laird, Birkenhead
- Yard number: 1016
- Launched: 7 July 1936
- Completed: January 1937
- Decommissioned: 15 October 1963
- Renamed: Enea, 1963
- Identification: UK official number 165365; Call sign GZCJ
- Fate: Sold for scrap, 1963

General characteristics
- Type: refrigerated cargo ship
- Tonnage: As built: 11,076 GRT; tonnage under deck 9,040; 6,787 NRT; After 1943 repairs: 12,791 GRT; tonnage under deck 11,614; 7,948 NRT
- Length: 530 ft (160 m)
- Beam: 70.4 ft (21.5 m)
- Draught: As built: 35 ft 0 in (10.67 m); After 1943 repairs: 43 ft 4 in (13.21 m)
- Depth: 32.2 ft (9.8 m)
- Installed power: 2,806 NHP
- Propulsion: 2 × 10-cylinder Sulzer Bros marine Diesel engines; twin screws
- Sensors & processing systems: wireless direction finding; echo sounding device; gyrocompass
- Armament: DEMS
- Notes: sister ship: Melbourne Star

Service record
- Operations: Operation Pedestal, 1942

MV Brisbane Star was a British refrigerated cargo liner. She was built by Cammell Laird and Co in 1936–37 as one of Blue Star Line's Imperial Star-class ships, designed to ship frozen meat from Australia and New Zealand to the United Kingdom. The ship served in the Second World War and is distinguished for her role in Operation Pedestal to relieve the siege of Malta in August 1942. She was owned by a succession of Blue Star-controlled companies until 1963, when she was sold to a Liberian-registered company who renamed her Enea. Later that same year she was scrapped in Japan.

== Building ==
Cammell Laird and Co in Birkenhead, England built the sister ships Melbourne Star and Brisbane Star and launched them on the same day, 7 July 1936. Melbourne Star was completed in November 1936, followed by Brisbane Star in January 1937. Both ships were initially owned by Union Cold Storage, a ship-owning company controlled by Blue Star Line.

The Imperial Star class were motor ships. Melbourne Star and Brisbane Star each had a pair of 10-cylinder two-stroke single-acting Sulzer Bros marine Diesel engines driving twin screws. Brisbane Star's engines developed a total of 2,806 HP. Her navigation equipment included wireless direction finding, an echo sounding device and a gyrocompass.

== Second World War service ==
Brisbane Star's regular cargo liner route was from London via South Africa to Australia or New Zealand, returning by the same route laden with frozen meat. En route she tended to call at either Las Palmas or Cape Verde, presumably for bunkering.

During the war it was strategically important to continue meat imports to the UK. However, under wartime conditions Brisbane Star's route was increasingly changed. After France surrendered to Germany in June 1940 the Port of London became too dangerous, so instead the ship used Liverpool or sometimes Avonmouth or Newport, Wales. From 1940 her voyages home from Australia or New Zealand tended to be eastward via the Pacific Ocean and Panama Canal instead of westward via the Indian Ocean, South Africa and the South Atlantic.

At times the Brisbane Star was taken off her usual service to support operations in the Mediterranean. Blue Star also had a regular trade importing frozen meat to the UK from South America, where Brisbane Star five times from 1941 to 1944. In 1941 she also made one visit to Bombay and two to Colombo.

As she was a fast merchant ship Brisbane Star was left to make most of her wartime voyages unescorted. The few exceptions were mostly in the Mediterranean, the Red Sea, and sometimes outbound convoys from the UK from which she would either detach in mid-Atlantic or continue as far as Freetown in Sierra Leone.

=== Middle East and Greece ===
At the end of August 1940 Brisbane Star was diverted to support Allied operations in the Middle East. She was a member of Convoy AP 3/1, which left Liverpool on 10 September and reached Suez on 22 October. But on 1 November, British and Empire forces had landed on Crete to support the Greek war effort, and on 5 November Brisbane Star came north through the Suez Canal and called at Port Said. Her destination was Souda Bay in Crete, where she arrived the next day under naval escort. She stayed until 14 November, when she returned under naval escort to Port Said.

=== Operation Pedestal ===
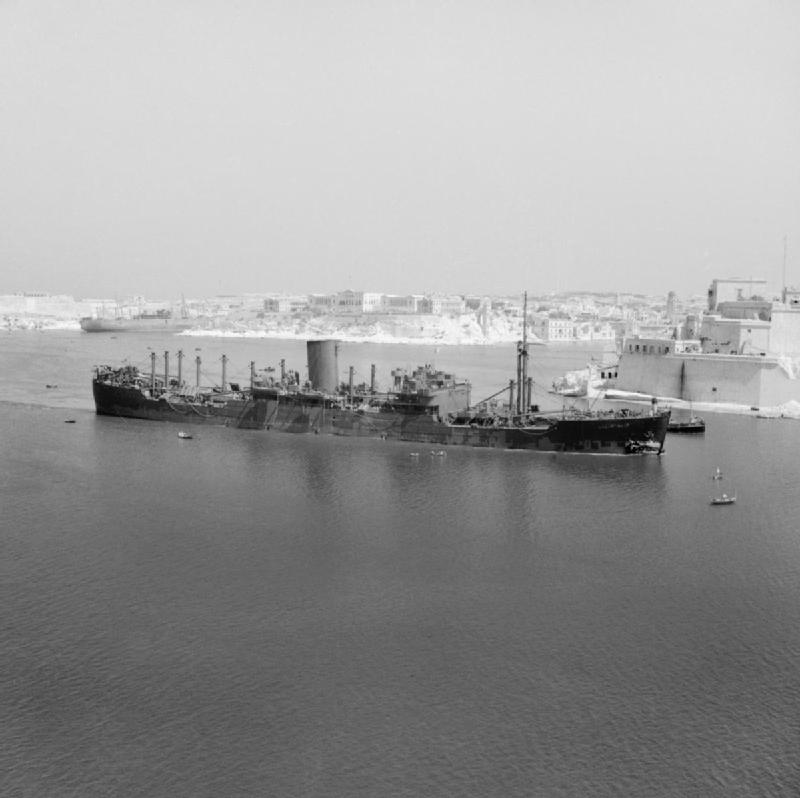
Brisbane Star reaches the Grand Harbour at Malta, 14 August 1942

On 31 July 1942 Brisbane Star entered the Firth of Clyde, where she and her sister Melbourne Star joined the Convoy WS 21S for Operation Pedestal to relieve the siege of Malta. The convoy left on 2 August under heavy naval escort and passed Gibraltar on 10 August, where it became Convoy MW 2.

Off Cap Bon on 12 August a Luftwaffe aircraft launched an aerial torpedo at Brisbane Star. It damaged her bow, almost tearing it off, but she stayed afloat. She could make only 3 knots (5.6 km/h), so she rounded Cap Bon and anchored in the Gulf of Hammamet. There the harbour master of Sousse in Vichy French Tunisia boarded the ship, declared her unseaworthy and ordered her to be detained and enter port. Brisbane Star's Master, Captain Frederick Riley, refused and the harbour master eventually withdrew but agreed take ashore one crewman, who had been seriously wounded in the attack, but unfortunately he died shortly afterwards.

Eventually Malta sent Spitfires to escort Brisbane Star the 200 miles to Valletta, where she and her cargo safely reached the Grand Harbour on 14 August.

Brisbane Star's damaged bow at Malta, August 1942

Brisbane Star stayed in Malta for almost four months, while her bow received temporary repairs good enough to return to deep sea service. On 7 December she left Malta with Convoy ME 11, which reached Port Said four days later. She then passed through the Suez Canal, called at Aden on 20 December, and spent Christmas 1942 and New Year 1943 heading south through the Indian Ocean. After calling at Cape Town in early January she reached Argentina. This may be when Blue Star had her bow further rebuilt at Puerto Belgrano Naval Base. She was at Buenos Aires at the end of January and again in late February, before leaving for home on 26 February. She went via Gibraltar, where she arrived on 21 March. A week later she left and joined Convoy MKF 11, which was en route from Bône in French Algeria to the Firth of Clyde. She reached Liverpool on 5 April.

Captain Riley was one of three Merchant Navy captains from Operation Pedestal who were awarded the DSO "for fortitude, seamanship and endurance... in the face of relentless attacks... from enemy submarines, aircraft and surface forces". His Chief Officer Robert White, Chief Engineer Allan Nicol, Second Officer C.R. Horton and Junior Second Engineer J Dobbie were awarded the DSC. Boatswain F Wilson and ship's carpenter A Nylander were awarded the DSM and Junior Third Engineer A.J. Pretty was mentioned in dispatches.

=== Nominal change of ownership ===
In 1943 Blue Star transferred her ownership from Union Cold Storage to Frederick Leyland and Co. The repairs were accompanied by alterations that considerably increased the ship's tonnage and deepened her draught by 9 feet 4 inches (2.84 m).

=== London and Hawaii ===
In May 1945 Germany surrendered to the Allies, and in June Brisbane Star returned to London for the first time in five and a half years. Her final voyage of the war was from Norfolk, Virginia via the Panama Canal to Pearl Harbor, where she arrived on 29 August, three days before the Surrender of Japan.

== Post-war service ==
Blue Star transferred Brisbane Star's ownership twice more: to Lamport and Holt Line in 1950 and to Blue Star Line itself in 1959. In July 1963 Blue Star sold the ship to Margalante Compania Naviera, SA of Liberia, who renamed her Enea. In October 1963 she arrived at Izumi-Ohtsu shipbreakers in Osaka, Japan, who scrapped her.

== Sources ==
- "Taffrail" (Henry Taprell Dorling) (1973). Blue Star Line at War, 1939–45. London: W. Foulsham & Co. pp. 78, 80, 90, 92, 95, 96. ISBN 0-572-00849-X.
- Crabb, Brian James (2014). Operation Pedestal: The story of Convoy WS21S in August 1942. England: Shaun Tyas. ISBN 978-1-907730-19-1.
