= Baie de Seine =

Bay in northern France

Coordinates: 49°30′N 0°30′W

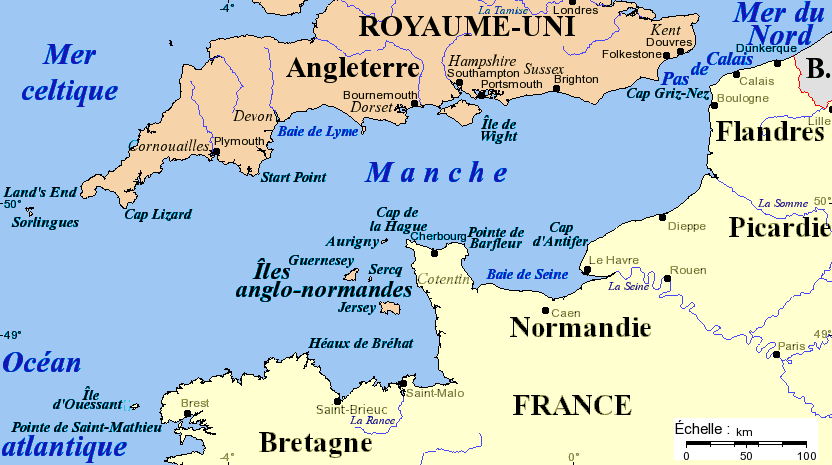
Map of the English Channel showing Baie de la Seine bordering Normandie.

The Baie de Seine (French pronunciation: [bɛ də sɛn], Bay of the Seine River) is a bay in northern France.

== Geography ==
It is a wide, rectangular inlet of the English Channel, approximately 100 kilometres (east-west) by 45 kilometres, bounded in the west by the Cotentin Peninsula, in the south by the Normandy coast and in the east by the estuary of the river Seine at Le Havre. The coast alternates between sandy beaches and rocky promontories and, in general, it offers little shelter for shipping. At the western end of the bay are the Îles Saint-Marcouf.

== Economy ==
Le Havre is the major port of the region; there are minor harbours at Barfleur, Port-en-Bessin, Courseulles-sur-Mer, Langrune-sur-Mer, Ouistreham, Trouville-sur-Mer and Honfleur.

Domestic and foreign tourists visit the coast, given its World War II associations, sandy beaches and proximity to Paris. There are coastal resorts at Arromanches, Deauville, Cabourg, Houlgate, Villers-sur-Mer, Trouville-sur-Mer and Honfleur.

== History ==
The Battles of Barfleur and La Hogue were naval battles fought off Barfleur and Saint-Vaast-la-Hougue in the 17th century.

The Normandy coast was the location, during World War II, of the main Allied landings in France; the unavailability of significant harbours caused the Allies to construct artificial harbours (Mulberries) at Arromanches and Omaha Beach. There are remains of these harbours at Arromanches.
