= List of Allied convoy codes during World War II =

This is a list of convoy codes used by the Allies during World War II There were over 300 convoy routes organized, in all areas of the world; each was designated by a two- or three letter code. List of Allied convoys during World War II by region provides additional information.

A - B - C - D - E - F - G - H - I - J - K - L - M - N - O - P - Q - R - S - T - U - V - W - X - Y - Z

== A ==
Convoy	Origin and destination	Dates	Remarks
AB	Miscellaneous	Sep 1939 to May 1940	
AB	Aden to Bombay	Sep 1942 to Oct 1944	Slow convoys
ABF	Aden to Bombay	1944 to Feb 1945	Fast troop ship convoys
ABS	Algiers to Bougie, French North Africa	Nov 1942	Single convoy; after Operation Torch
AC	Aden to Colombo	???	
AC	Alexandria to Bengazi or Tobruk	Feb 1941 to Apr 1941	"Alexandria to Cyrenaica"
AG	Alexandria to Greece	Mar 1941 to Apr 1941	Military supply convoys; during the period of the German Operation Marita invasion of Greece
AH	Aruba to Halifax	Jul 1942 to Sep 1942	Three tanker convoys; reverse HA
AH	Malta or Augusta to Italy	Oct 1943 to Jan 1945	Reverse HA
AH	Bari to Ancona in Italy	Jan 1945 to May 1945	
AJ	Aden to Colombo	Jan 1942 to Feb 1945	"Aden to Jafna"; reverse JA
AK	Aden to Kilindini	Sep 1940 to Aug 1944	Reverse KA
AKD	Aden to Kilindini, then Durban	Sep 1943 to Apr 1944	27 convoys; reverse DKA
AM	Chittagong to Madras	Mar 1944 to Mar 1945	Reverse MA
AM	Algiers or Oran to the south of France	Aug 1944 to Oct 1944	For Operation Dragoon
AN	Alexandria or Port Said to Piraeus or Souda Bay	Sep 1940 to May 1941	"Aegean Northbound"; reverse AS
AN	Admiralty Islands to New Guinea	Apr 1944 to Aug 1944	Following Operation Brewer; reverse NA
ANF	Alexandria to Piraeus	1940 to 1941	"Aegean Northbound Fast"
AP	UK to Egypt	Aug 1940 to Oct 1940	Three troopship convoys; during the start of the Western Desert Campaign
AP	Aden to Persian Gulf	Sep 1942 to Feb 1945	"Aden to Persian Gulf"; 92 convoys; reverse PA
ARG	Boston to New York City or Argentia, Newfoundland	Oct 1942 to Sep 1944	
ARM	Mediterranean local traffic	Aug 1944 to Oct 1944	Following Operation Dragoon
AS	Piraeus to Alexandria	Jun 1940 to May 1941	"Aegean Southbound"; reverse AN
AS	New York to Suez	Mar 1942 to Jan 1943	"America–Suez"
AT	Alexandria to Tobruk	Nov 1941 to Jun 1942	46 convoys; reverse TA
AT	United States to UK	Jan 1942 to Jul 1945	Troopship convoys; reverse TA
AT	Ancona and Trieste	Jun 1945	Italian east coast route; 2 convoys
ATM	Antwerp to Thames	Dec 1944 to Jun 1945	"Antwerp to Thames Military"; 154 military convoys
AW	Aruba to Curaçao	Sep 1942 to Jul 1944	"Aruba to Willemstad"; Local tanker convoys; reverse WA

== B ==
Convoy	Origin and destination	Dates	Remarks
BA	Bombay to Aden	Feb 1941 to Sep 1944	Reverse AB
BAF	Bombay to Aden	Sep 1944 to Jan 1945	Fast troopship convoys; reverse ABF
BB	Belfast to Milford Haven	Jan 1941 to May 1945	432 convoys
BB	Clyde to Bristol Channel	1945	
BC	African routes	Jun 1940 to Jun 1940	British special convoys
BC	Charleston, SC, to Bora Bora	Jan 1942 to Feb 1942	Single convoy; to reinforce US forces in the Pacific after Pearl Harbor
BC	Beira to Durban	Jul 1943 to Aug 1944	"Biera to Cape", reverse CB
BC	Bombay, India, to Colombo, Ceylon	Sep 1943 to Aug 1945	
BC	Clyde to Bristol Channel	1945	
BCS	Cape Town, South Africa to Freetown, Sierra Leone	Jun 1940 to Jul 1940	Single convoy
BD	White Sea to Dikson	Jul 1941 to Sep 1944	Reverse DB
BEC	Bristol Channel to France	Oct 1944 to Dec 1944	Reverse EBC
BF	Bahia to Freetown	1943 to 1945	Under US Navy escort; reverse FG
BG	Milne Bay to New Guinea	Jul 1944 to ???	Reverse GB
BG	Brisbane to Gladstone	Jan 1943 to Jul 1944	
BG	Biak to Morotai or Morotai to Hollandia	Nov 1944 to Jan 1945	
BHX	Bermuda to HX rendezvous	May 1940 to Jul 1941	82 feeder convoys
BK	Bombay to Karachi	Jan 1943	Single convoy (BK.1); reverse KB
BK	White Sea to Kola	1943 to 1945	Reverse KB
BLUE	Port Said to Gibraltar	Sep 1939 to Nov 1939	
BM	Bombay to Singapore	Sep 1940 to Feb 1942	16 convoys
BM	Karachi or Bombay to Colombo	Feb 1942 to Dec 1944	Reverse MB
BN	Bombay to Aden or the Suez Canal	Jun 1940 to Apr 1941	"Bombay Northward"; 33 convoys
BN	Cape Gloucester, New Britain to Langemak Bay, New Guinea or Guadalcanal	Apr 1944 to Jun 1944	Reverse NB
BP	Bombay to Persian Gulf	Apr 1941 to Feb 1945	Reverse PB
BRN	Bahia to Recife	1942 to 1945	"Bahia to Recife Northward"
BS	Suez to Aden, often for dispersal	Jun 1940 to Apr 1941	
BS	Corner Brook to Sydney	1942 to 1945	Reverse SB
BS	Brest to Casablanca, Morocco	Sep 1939 to Jun 1940	
BT	Bahia, Brazil to Trinidad	Jan 1943 to Jul 1943	Reverse TB
BT	Sydney, Nova Scotia to United States (east coast)	1943 to 1945	Troopship convoys
BT	Brisbane to United States	Jan 1942 to Jun 1943	Reverse TB
BT	Brisbane to Townsville, Australia	Aug 1942 to May 1943	
BTC	Milford Haven and the Bristol Channel to Thames	Dec 1941 to May 1945	165 convoys; reverse TBC
BV	Brisbane to Townsville	May 1943 to Jul 1943	Reverse VB
BW	Sydney, Nova Scotia to Saint John's, Newfoundland	Sep 1942 to May 1945	
BX	Boston to Halifax	Mar 1942 to May 1945	206 convoys; reverse XB
BZ	Bombay to Kilindini and Aden	???	

== C ==
Convoy	Origin and destination	Dates	Remarks
C	Colombo, Ceylon to dispersal	Apr 1942 to Jun 1943	
CA	Cape Town, South Africa to dispersal	Dec 1942 to Jun 1943	
CB	Durban to Beira and beyond	Jul 1943 to Aug 1944	Reverse BC
CD	Cape Town to Durban	Nov 1942 to Aug 1944	Reverse DC
CE	St Helen's Road, Isle of Wight, to Southend	Jul 1940 to May 1944	"Channel Eastward"; 262 British coastal convoys; reverse CW
CF	Cape Town to Freetown and ultimately the UK	Apr 1941 to Oct 1943	
CF	Colombo to Fremantle	Mar 1941 to ???	Fast liners
CG	Casablanca to Gibraltar	1943 to May 1945	Originally FT convoys; reverse GC
CH	Chittagong to Calcutta	Feb 1944 to Jan 1945	Reverse HC
CJ	Calcutta to Colombo	Apr 1943 to Jan 1945	Reverse JC
CK	Havana, Cuba to Key West	Oct 1942 to Aug 1943	"Cuba to Key West"
CK	Charleston to UK	Jan 1944 to Nov 1944	
CL	St. John's to Sydney or Halifax, Nova Scotia	Feb 1942 to Jun 1943	Reverse LC
CM	Cape Town or Durban via Kilindini, Kenya to Red Sea ports	Mar 1940 to Apr 1945	"Cape Military"; military convoys; reverse MC
CMA	Durban to Mombasa	Jun 1940 to Jul 1940	Single convoy within CM
CN	North from Cape Town for dispersal	Jan 1943 to Jun 1944	"Cape Town Northward"
CNF	Sicily Invasion Force	Jun 1943 to Jul 1943	Fast convoys; Operation Husky
CO	Newcastle to Melbourne and Adelaide	Jun 1942 to Dec 1943	150 convoys; reverse OC
COC	Plymouth to Brittany	Nov 1944 to May 1945	Military convoys using coasting vessels; for the delivery of military supplies
CP	Curaçao to Panama Canal	1942	Tanker convoys
CRD	Casablanca to Dakar	May 1944 to Oct 1944	Reverse DRC
CT	UK to Canada	Aug 1941 to Jun 1942	Troopship convoys; reverse TC
CT	Corsica via Sardinia to Bizerta	1944	Reverse TC
CT	Cristobal, Panama, to Trinidad	Jun 1942	Single convoy (CT.1)
CU	Curaçao (or New York) to UK	Mar 1943 to Jun 1945	"Curaçao to the UK"; 8 tanker and 74 troopship convoys; reverse UC
CV	Cyrenaica (Tobruk) to Valletta (Malta)	1944	Reverse VC
CW	Cristobal to Key West	Jul 1942	"Cristóbal to Key West"; two convoys
CW	Southend to St Helen's Roads and Yarmouth, Isle of Wight, and then Falmouth }	Jul 1940 to Jun 1944	"Channel Westward"; 270 coastal convoys; reverse CE
CX	Colombo to Addu Atoll	Apr 1943 to Feb 1945	
CZ	Curaçao to Cristobal	Sep 1942 to Feb 1943	"Curaçao to Panama Canal Zone"; reverse ZC

== D ==
Convoy	Origin and destination	Dates	Remarks
D	Dakar to Casablanca	1939 to 1940	
DB	Southern England to north-western France	Sep 1939 to Oct 1939	
DB	Dikson to White Sea	1942 to 1944	Reverse BD
DB	Durban, South Africa, for dispersal	May 1943	One convoy (DB.38)
DBF	Dakar via Bathurst to Freetown	1943	
DC	Durban to Port Elizabeth or Cape Town	Dec 1942 to Sep 1944	Reverse CD
DF	Clyde to Faroes	???	Military ferry convoys; reverse FD
DG	Thursday Island to Merauke	???	Reverse GD
DK	Durban to Kilindini	Sep 1943 to Sep 1944	Reverse KD
DKA	Durban via Kilindini to Aden	Sep 1943 to Jun 1944	Reverse AKD
DLM	Durban to Lourenço Marques	Jul 1943 to Jun 1944	Reverse LMD
DM	Durban to Malaya	Jan 1942 to Mar 1942	Three convoys
DN	Darwin northwards	Jul 1944 to Sep 1945	
DN	Durban for dispersal	Nov 1942 to Mar 1945	"Durban Northward"
DR	Dakar to Gibraltar or Casablanca	Apr 1944 to Oct 1944	
DRC	Dakar to Casablanca	Mar 1945 to Apr 1945	Reverse CRD
DS	Clyde to Reykjavík	Apr 1941 to May 1945	Military ferry convoys; reverse SD
DSF	Dakar to Freetown	Feb 1944 to Jul 1944	Reverse FSD
DSL	Dakar via Freetown to Lagos	???	Reverse LSD
DSP	Dakar via Freetown to Pointe Noire	???	Reverse PAD
DST	Dakar via Freetown to Takoradi	???	Reverse TSD
DT	Darwin to Thursday Island	Feb 1943 to Sep 1944	Reverse TD
DWI	Dutch West Indies to UK	1943	Not used

== E ==
Convoy	Origin and destination	Dates	Remarks
E	Trinidad to dispersal	Jun 1942 to Aug 1942	During Operation Paukenschlag
EBC	Bristol Channel to France	Jun 1944 to Oct 1944	126 military coastal convoys; reverse FBC
EBM	Clyde River or Milford Haven to southern England or Seine Bay, northern France	Jun 1944	5 military convoys
EC	Southend to Clyde River, Oban and Loch Ewe	Mar 1941 to Nov 1941	90 coastal convoys
ECM	Falmouth to Seine Bay, northern France	Jun 1944 to Jul 1944	Motor transport convoys; during Operation Overlord
ECP	Portland to Seine Bay	Jun 1944 to Jul 1944	Personnel convoys; reverse FCP
EMM	Belfast to France	Jun 1944 to Jul 1944	Three motor transport convoys; during Operation Overlord
EMP	Belfast to France	Jul 1944	Personnel convoys; during Operation Overlord
EN	Methil to Clyde River and later Loch Ewe	Aug 1940 to May 1945	595 coastal convoys
EPM	Portland via the Solent to France	Jul 1944 to Sep 1944	Motor transport convoys; related to Operation Overlord; reverse FPM
EPP	Portland via the Solent to Seine Bay, France	Jul 1944 to Sep 1944	Personnel convoys; related to Operation Overlord; reverse FPP
ET	North Africa to Gibraltar	Nov 1942 to Jul 1943	After Operation Torch
ETC	Southend to Seine Bay, France	Jun 1944 to Oct 1944	Coastal convoys; reverse FTC; companion to EBC
ETM	Southend to Seine Bay, France	Jun 1944 to Oct 1944	Motor transport convoys; reverse FTM
EWC	Spithead to Seine Bay, France	Jun 1944	Coastal convoys; reverse FWC
EWL	Southampton or Isle of Wight to Seine Bay, France	Aug 1944 to Sep 1944	Landing craft convoys; reverse FWL
EWM	Isle of Wight to Seine Bay, France	Sep 1944 to Oct 1944	Motor transport convoys; related to Operation Overlord; reverse FWM
EWP	Isle of Wight to Seine Bay, France	Jun 1944	Personnel convoys; related to Operation Overlord; reverse FWP
EXP	UK to Seine Bay, France	Jun 1944	Operation Overlord invasion forces; reverse FXP

== F ==
Convoy	Origin and destination	Dates	Remarks
FB	Freetown to Bahia	1943 to 1945	Reverse BF
FBC	Seine Bay to Bristol Channel	Jun 1944 to Oct 1944	Military convoys; return convoys from Operation Overlord; reverse EBC
FBM	Seine Bay to Falmouth or the Bristol Channel	Jun 1944	Military convoys returning empty from Operation Overlord; reverse EBM
FBP	Seine Bay to Portland	Jun 1944	Single personnel convoy (FBP.1B) returning empty from Operation Overlord
FC	France to West of England	1944	
FC	Fall River, New Guinea, to Cairns, Australia	Feb 1943 to May 1943	Military convoys
FCM	Seine Bay to the south-western UK	Jun 1944 to Jul 1944	Military convoys; return empty vehicle and equipment vessels from Operation Overlord for reloading; reverse ECM
FCP	France to the south-west of England	Jun 1944 to Jul 1944	Military convoys; personnel counterparts to FCM; reverse ECP
FD	Faroes to Clyde	Mar 1943	Single military convoy (FD.3); reverse DF
FF	UK and northwestern France	Jun 1940	Troop and evacuation convoys
FFT	Freetown to Trinidad	1942 to 1943	Reverse TF
FG	Fremantle to Adelaide	1942 to 1945	Reverse GF
FH	Saint John to Halifax	Sep 1942 to May 1945	Reverse HF
FJ	Florianópolis to Rio de Janeiro	???	Reverse JF
FM	Milne Bay to Port Moresby	Jan 1944 to Jun 1944	Two convoys; reverse MF
FN	Thames to Forth	Sep 1940 to Jun 1945	"Forth North"; 1,660 coastal convoys; reverse FS
FP	Britain to Norway	Apr 1940 to May 1940	Three troop ship convoys
FPM	France to Portland	Jul 1944 to Sep 1944	"France to Portland"; military motor transport convoys returning after delivery to land campaign following Operation Overlord
FPP	France to Portland	Jul 1944 to Aug 1944	"France to Portland"; military personnel convoys returning after delivery to land campaign following Operation Overlord; reverse EPP
FS	Forth to Thames	Sep 1939 to May 1945	"Forth South; 1,778 coastal convoys; reverse FN
FS	Scapa Flow to Norway, and Best, Netherlands to Namsos, Norway	Apr 1945 to May 1945	
FSD	Freetown to Dakar	Apr 1944 to Oct 1944	Reverse DFS
FT	Fall River, Papua, and Townsville, Queensland	Jun 1943 to Dec 1943	
FT	Freetown, Sierra Leone, to Trinidad	Jul 1943	Central Atlantic convoys
FTC	Seine Bay, France to Southend on the Thames river	Jun 1944 to Sep 1944	"France to Thames Coaster"; 122 military supply convoys; reverse ETM
FTM	Seine Bay, France to Southend on the Thames river	Jun 1944 to Sep 1944	"France to Thames Military"; 91 military motor transport convoys; after deliveries for Operation Overlord and follow-on operations; reverse ETC
FWC	France to Isle of Wight	Jun 1944	Military coaster convoys; after deliveries for Operation Overlord; reverse EWC
FWL	France to Isle of Wight	Jul 1944 to Sep 1944	Landing craft convoys; delivery back to the UK after Operation Overlord; reverse WEL
FWM	France to Isle of Wight	Jun 1944 to Sep 1944	Military motor transport convoys; after deliveries for Operation Overlord; reverse EWM
FWP	France to Isle of Wight	Jun 1944 to Sep 1944	Military personnel convoys; after delivering troops for Operation Overlord; reverse EWP
FXP	France to UK	Jun 1944 to Oct 1944	Military convoys; after delivering troops and equipment for Operation Overlord

== G ==
Convoy	Origin and destination	Dates	Remarks
G	Guantanamo to San Juan	Sep 1942 to Apr 1944	
GAT	Guantanamo via Aruba to Trinidad	Aug 1942 to May 1945	209 convoys; reverse TAG
GB	New Guinea (Southwest Pacific Area) to Milne Bay	Jul 1944 to May 1945	Reverse BG
GC	Gibraltar to Casablanca	Mar 1943 to Apr 1945	Originally TF convoys, after Operation Torch; reverse CG
GD	Merauke, Netherlands New Guinea, to Thursday Island, Australia	1944 to Aug 1945	Reverse DG
GF	Adelaide to Fremantle, Australia	1942 to 1945	Reverse FG
GI	New Guinea to Philippines	Jan 1945 to May 1945	Reverse IG; supported the US "Love", "Mike", and "Victor" operations in the Philippine islands group
GJ	Guantanamo to Kingston, Jamaica	???	Reverse JG
GK	Guantanamo to Key West	Sep 1942 to May 1945	163 convoys; reverse KG
GM	Gibraltar to Malta	Jul 1941 to Jun 1942	Reverse MG
GM	Galveston, TX to the Mississippi River	???	Reverse MG
GN	Guantanamo to New York	Aug 1942 to May 1945	207 US coastal convoys; reverse NG
GP	Guantanamo to the Panama Canal	Jul 1942 to Aug 1942	Reverse PG
GP	Sydney to Townsville and Brisbane, Australia	Jun 1942 to Feb 1944	Reverse PG
GP	Galveston to Pilottown, MS	1942 to 1945	Reverse PG
Green	Gibraltar to Alexandria or Port Said, Egypt	Sep 1939 to Oct 1939	
Greyback	Dieppe, Seine-Maritime to Newhaven, East Sussex	???	British military ferry convoys
GS	Greenland to Sydney, Nova Scotia or St. John's, Newfoundland and Labrador	Jul 1942 to Jun 1945	Reverse SG
GS	Grimsby to Southend	Mar 1940 to Apr 1940	Reverse SG
GT	Gladstone, Queensland to Townsville	Dec 1942 to Jun 1943	
GTX	Gibraltar via Tripoli to Alexandria or Port Said	May 1942 to Aug 1943	"Gibraltar, Tripoli and Alexandria"
GUF	Oran, Algeria (later Naples, Italy) to the Chesapeake Bay	Nov 1942 to Apr 1945	25 fast military ocean convoys; started after the implementation of Operation Torch; reverse GUS
GUS	Port Said, Egypt or Oran, Algeria (later Naples, Italy) to the Chesapeake Bay	Dec 1942 to Jun 1945	98 slow military ocean convoys; started after the implementation of Operation Torch; reverse GUF
GZ	Guantanamo to Canal Zone	Aug 1942 to May 1945	Reverse ZG

== H ==
Convoy	Origin and destination	Dates	Remarks
HA	Halifax to Aruba or Curaçao	Jul 1942 to Aug 1942	4 convoys; reverse AH
HA	Bari or Ancona in southern Italy to Malta	Aug 1942 to Dec 1944	Reverse AH
HA	Ancona to Bari, Brindisi or Barletta in southern Italy	Jan 1945 to May 1945	
HB	Australia to India and the Red Sea	Jan 1945	Single troopship convoy
HC	Calcutta to Chittagong, India	Oct 1943 to Dec 1944	Reverse CH
HF	Halifax to Saint John, New Brunswick	Sep 1942 to May 1945	Reverse FH
HG	Gibraltar or Port Said to Liverpool in the UK	Sep 1939 to Sep 1942	"Homeward from Gibraltar"; 117 slow and fast convoys; reverse OG; after Operation Torch replaced by MKS series
HGY	Gibraltar or Port Said to Liverpool	Jul 1940	Single convoy
HGZ	Gibraltar to join the SL.36 convoy to the UK	Jun 1940 to Jul 1940	Single convoy
HHX	Halifax to join HX convoys from New York at the Halifax Ocean Meeting Point	???	
Hi	Japanese mercantile convoys between Singapore and Moji	Jul 1943 to Feb 1945	
HJ	Halifax to St. John's	May 1942 to Apr 1945	Reverse JH
HJF	Halifax to St. John's	Jan 1944 to May 1945	Fast convoys
HK	Galveston or Pilottown, MS to Key West, FL	Sep 1942 to May 1945	183 convoys; reverse KH
HM	Holyhead to Milford Haven, Wales	Dec 1941 to Feb 1943	Reverse MH
HN	Bergen, Norway to Methil, Firth of Forth	Oct 1939 to Apr 1940	"Homeward from Norway"; 28 convoys; reverse ON
HON	Halifax to join ON convoys at the Halifax Ocean Meeting Point	???	
HP	Heel of Italy to Piraeus, Greece	Oct 1944 to Mar 1945	"Heel to Piraeus"; reverse PH
HS	Halifax to Sydney, Nova Scotia	May 1942 to May 1945	Reverse SH
HT	Halifax to Trinidad	May 1942 to Jun 1942	"Halifax to Trinidad"; reverse TH
HX	Halifax and New York City to Liverpool	Sep 1939 to Jun 1945	North Atlantic route; fast convoys; reverse ON
HXA	HX ships via English Channel	1939 to 1945	
HXF	Halifax to Liverpool or Dover in the UK	Sep 1939 to Feb 1940	17 fast convoys
HXM	New York City to Liverpool	1939 to 1945	Medium speed convoys
HXS	New York City to Liverpool	1939 to 1945	Slow convoys

== I ==
Convoy	Origin and destination	Dates	Remarks
IG	Philippines to New Guinea	Jan 1945 to Mar 1945	Reverse GI
IKO	Manila, Philippines to Hollandia, New Guinea	Apr 1945 to May 1945	
IXF	Naples and Taranto, Italy, to Alexandria and Port Said, Egypt	Sep 1943 to Dec 1944	Reverse XIF

== J ==
Convoy	Origin and destination	Dates	Remarks
JA	Colombo to Aden	Feb 1944 to Feb 1945	Reverse AJ
JC	Colombo to Calcutta and other ports in India	Jul 1942 to Mar 1945	124 convoys; reverse CJ
JF	Rio de Janeiro to Florianópolis	???	Reverse FJ
JG	Kingston to Guantanamo	???	Reverse GJ
JH	St. John's to Halifax	May 1942 to Apr 1945	"St John's to Halifax"; reverse HJ
JM	India, via Kilindini, Kenya to Madagascar	May 1943 to Jun 1944	2 convoys
JM	India to Malaya invasion	Aug 1945 to Sep 1945	Assault convoys for Operation Zipper; 'JMA', 'JMB', 'JME', 'JMF' and 'JMG' convoys
JN	St. John's to Labrador	Jun 1942 to May 1944	Reverse NJ
JR	Rio de Janeiro to Recife, Brazil	???	Reverse RJ
JS	Colombo to Singapore	Feb 1942	"Colombo to Singapore"; reverse SJ
JT	Rio de Janeiro to Trinidad	Jul 1943 to Mar 1945	"Rio de Janeiro to Trinidad"; 70 convoys; reverse TJ; successor to BT convoys
JW	Loch Ewe, Scotland via Iceland to ports of the northern USSR	Dec 1942 to May 1945	22 convoys; reverse RA; successor to PQ convoys

== K ==
Convoy	Origin and destination	Dates	Remarks
K	Casablanca to Brest, the Gironde estuary or Nantes, France, or Oran, Algeria	Oct 1939 to Jun 1940	French convoys; included KF (fast) and KS (slow) components
KA	Kilindini to Aden	Nov 1942 to Dec 1943	Reverse AK
KB	Kola to White Sea	1943 to 1945	Reverse BK
KB	Karachi to Bombay	Apr 1943 to Jun 1943	Reverse BK
XX	Key West, Florida to Havana, Cuba	Oct 1942 to Aug 1943	"Key West to Cuba"; reverse CK
KD	Kilindini to Durban	Oct 1940 to Mar 1945	Reverse DK
KG	Key West to Guantanamo	Sep 1942 to May 1945	168 convoys; reverse GK
KH	Key West to Galveston and Houston, TX	Sep 1942 to May 1945	"Key West to Houston"; 146 convoys; reverse HK
KJ	Kingston to the UK	Sep 1939 to Oct 1939	
KM	Kilindini to Diego Suarez, Madagascar	Jun 1942 to Feb 1945	Reverse MK
KM	Karachi to Bombay	1942 to 1945	
KMF	UK to the Mediterranean and occasionally onward	Oct 1942 to May 1945	Fast convoys; reverse MKF
KMS	UK to the Mediterranean and occasionally onward	Oct 1942 to May 1945	Slow convoys; reverse MKS
KN	Key West to New York	May 1942 to May 1945	210 coastal convoys; reverse KS
KP	Key West to Pilottown, MS	Sep 1942 to Jan 1943	Reverse PK
KP	Karachi to Persian Gulf	Jul 1943	Single convoy (KP.1)
KP	Kola to Petsamo	Oct 1944 to May 1945	In support of the Petsamo-Kirkenes Strategic Offensive Operation
KR	Kilindini to Ceylon	Mar 1942 to Feb 1945	Reverse RK
KR	Calcutta, India, and Arakan ports, Burma, to Rangoon, Burma	May 1945 to Aug 1945	Reverse RK
KS	Casablanca to Brest	Sep 1939 to May 1940	73 slow convoys
KS	New York via Norfolk, Virginia to Key West	May 1942 to Sep 1942	"Key West South"; 36 convoys; reverse KN
KW	Key West to Havana	Sep 1942 to Dec 1942	Reverse CK
KX	UK to Gibraltar and later North African ports	Oct 1942 to Feb 1945	In support of Operation Torch and subsequent operations; reverse XK

== L ==
Convoy	Origin and destination	Dates	Remarks
LC	Sydney to St. John's	Mar 1942 to Jun 1943	Reverse CL
LE	Port Said or Alexandria, Egypt, via Famagusta, Cyprus, to Haifa in Palestine or Beirut in Lebanon	Jun 1941	"Levant East"; reverse LW
LGE	Lagos, Nigeria, to the east along the coast of West Africa	Mar 1944	"Lagos Eastbound"; 4 convoys; reverse LGW
LGW	Lagos, Nigeria, to the west along the coast of West Africa to Takoradi, Gold Coast	Sep 1943 to Dec 1944	"Lagos Westbound"; reverse LGE
LM	Lagos, Nigeria to Matadi, Congo	Jul 1943 to Aug 1943	
LMD	Lourenço Marques, Portuguese East Africa, to Durban, South Africa	1943 to 1944	"Lourenço Marques to Durban"; reverse DLM
LN	St. Lawrence to Labrador, Canada	Jun 1942 to Nov 1944	Reverse NL
LQ	Barrier Reef ports to Brisbane	Jul 1943 to Feb 1944	
LS	West African route, typically Lagos, Nigeria to Freetown, Sierra Leone	Apr 1942 to Aug 1942	
LSD	Lagos, Nigeria via Freetown, Sierra Leone to Dakar, French West Africa	???	Reverse DSL
LT	Lagos, Nigeria, to Takoradi, Gold Coast	Sep 1942 to Aug 1943	Reverse TL
LTS	Lagos, Nigeria via Takoradi, Gold Coast to Freetown, Sierra Leone	Sep 1943 to Sep 1944	Reverse STL
LU	Humber estuary, UK to Elbe river, Germany	May 1945 to Jun 1945	Reverse UL
LW	Haifa, Palestine to Port Said, Egypt	???	"Levant West"; reverse LE
LW	East coast of the US to the South-West Pacific Area	Jun 1942 to Nov 1942	3 convoys

== M ==
Convoy	Origin and destination	Dates	Remarks
MA	Mombasa or Kilindini, Kenya to Aden	Oct 1941 to Dec 1941	3 convoys
MA	Madras to Port Blair, Andaman Islands or Chittagong, India	Jan 1942 to Mar 1945	Reverse AM
MB	Southampton to Brest	Sep 1939 to Oct 1939	Troops/equipment of the British Expeditionary Force for the reinforcement of France
MB	Colombo to Bombay	Apr 1942 to Jan 1945	Reverse BM
MB	Port Moresby to Fall River and other Papuan destination	Mar 1943 to Nov 1943	
MC	Aden via Kilindini and Durban to Cape Town	Nov 1942 to Mar 1945	Reverse CM
MD	Madagascar to Durban	???	
ME	Malta to Alexandria and Port Said, Egypt	Jul 1940 to Jun 1943	"Malta Eastward" or "Malta to Egypt"; reverse MW
MF	Port Moresby to Milne Bay and Fall River, Papua	Dec 1943 to Mar 1944	Four convoys; Reverse FM
MF	Malta to Alexandria	Jun 1940 to Oct 1940	Four convoys
MG	Malta to Gibraltar	Dec 1940 to Mar 1942	Three military convoys; reverse GM
MG	Mississippi to Galveston	1942 to 1943	Reverse GM
MH	Milford Haven to Holyhead	??? 1942 to Jul 1942	Over 240 convoys; reverse HM
MH	Milford Haven to Clyde River	Jan 1945 to May 1945	
MK	Madagascar to Kilindini	Aug 1942 to Mar 1945	24 convoys; reverse KM
MKF	North Africa via Gibraltar to Liverpool or the Firth of Clyde	Nov 1942 to Jun 1945	"Mediterranean to the UK Fast"; 57 fast military convoys; reverse KMF
MKS	North Africa via Gibraltar to Liverpool	Nov 1942 to Jun 1945	"Mediterranean to the UK Slow"; 162 slow military convoys; reverse KMS; successor to HG after Operation Torch
MN	Kilindini, Kenya, or Mauritius to Seychelles for dispersal	Oct 1943 to Mar 1944	7 convoys
MO	Marseille to Oran and other ports in North Africa	Sep 1939 to Jun 1940	Reverse OM
MR	Madras to Rangoon	Jan 1942 to Mar 1942	Support for the defence of Burma against the Japanese B invasion; reverse RM
MS	Melbourne to Singapore	Jan 1942 to Mar 1942	Support for the British-led forces facing the Japanese E invasion; 4 convoys
MS	Marseille to Naples	1944 to 1945	Reverse SM
MT	Methil on the Firth of Forth to Tyne estuary	Feb 1940 to Sep 1940	"Methil to Tyne"; 175 coastal convoys
MT	Port Moresby, Papua to Townsville, Australia	Nov 1942	"Port Moresby to Townsville"; single convoy
MTC	Bay of the Seine to Southend	Oct 1944 to Dec 1944	60 military convoys returning empty coasting cargo vessels to the UK; reverse TMC; successor to FTC
MTM	Bay of the Seine to Southend or other British ports	Oct 1944 to Nov 1944	19 military motor transport convoys; reverse TMM; successor to FTM
MV	Milne Bay, Papua to Townsville, Australia	Dec 1943 to Mar 1944	31 convoys
MW	Alexandria, Egypt to Malta	Nov 1940 to Jun 1943	"Malta Westward"; 33 convoys
MWF	Port Said to Sicily, or via Malta to Bizerte or Algiers	Jul 1943 to Aug 1943	Fast convoys; part of Operation Husky
MWS	Alexandria, Egypt, to various ports of Sicily	Jul 1943 to Aug 1943	Slow convoys; part of Operation Husky

== N ==
Convoy	Origin and destination	Dates	Remarks
NA	Canada to UK	Jan 1942 to Oct 1942	16 military troopship convoys
NA	Langemak Bay, New Guinea to ports in the Admiralty Islands group	Apr 1944 to Aug 1944	36 military convoys
NAP	Dover to France	Dec 1944	Military convoys
NB	Langemak Bay, New Guinea to Cape Gloucester, New Britain	Jun 1944 to Jul 1944	Four small convoys; reverse BN
NB	Singapore to dispersal	Jan 1942	Single convoy; related to the response to the Japanese "E" invasion of Malaya
NC	Walvis Bay to Cape Town, South Africa	Feb 1943 to Jun 1943	18 convoys
NCF	Oran in French northwest Africa to Sicily	Jul 1943	Fast convoys for the Allied invasion of Sicily, Operation Husky; reverse CNF
NCS	Oran in French northwest Africa to Sicily	Jul 1943	Slow convoys for the Allied invasion of Sicily, Operation Husky
NE	New Zealand to the Panama Canal	1942 to 1945	
NG	New York City to Guantanamo, Cuba	Aug 1942 to May 1945	"New York to Guantánamo"; 207 convoys; reverse GN
NJ	Newfoundland from Botwood to St. John's	Jun 1942 to May 1944	36 convoys; reverse JN
NK	New York to Key West, Florida	Aug 1942 to May 1945	"New York to Key West"; 164 convoys; reverse KN
NL	Labrador to St. Lawrence, Canada	Jul 1942 to Nov 1944	Reverse LN
NLY	Lingayen Gulf, Philippine islands to Humboldt Bay, Netherlands New Guinea to Leyte, Philippine islands group	Apr 1945 to May 1945	Five convoys
NP	Turkey to Port Said, Egypt	????	
NP	River Clyde to Narvik, Norway	Apr 1940 to May 1940	Two military ferry convoys in response to the German Operation Weserübung
NR	Norway to Methil on the Firth of Forth	May 1945	Reverse RN
NS	River Clyde to Norway	May 1940	Two convoys in response to the German Operation Weserübung
NS	New Caledonia to Sydney, Australia	???	Reverse SN
NSF	North Africa to Naples, Italy	Sep 1943 to Jul 1944	31 convoys; in support of Operation Avalanche and follow-on operations in southern Italy; reverse SNF
NSM	Scapa Flow, Orkney islands group to Narvik, Norway	Apr 1940	Single convoy (NSM.1)
NT	Port Moresby, New Guinea to Townsville, Australia	Jan 1943 to Mar 1944	75 convoys; reverse TN
NV	Naples to Augusta and sometimes onward to Malta	Oct 1943 to Mar 1945	151 convoys; reverse VN
NY	New York City to destinations in the Caribbean and the UK	Aug 1943 to Nov 1944	57 convoys

== O ==
Convoy	Origin and destination	Dates	Remarks
OA	Southend or Methil toward Liverpool for dispersal	Jul 1939 to Oct 1940	226 convoys; joined with "OB" convoys to make the passage to Gibraltar, then designated "G" and become an "OG" convoy
OB	Liverpool out into the Atlantic	Sep 1939 to Aug 1941	346 convoys; combined with "OA" convoys for passage to Gibraltar to become an "OG" convoy
OC	Melbourne to Newcastle	Jun 1942 to Dec 1943	149 convoys; reverse CO
OG	UK (later only Liverpool) to Gibraltar	Oct 1939 to Sep 1942	"Outbound to Gibraltar"; mercantile convoys; combined from the "OA" and "OB" convoys; reverse HG
OL	Liverpool to the west for dispersal	Sep 1940 to Oct 1940	Eight ocean outward fast convoys
OM	Oran to Marseille or Toulon, France	Oct 1944 to Jan 1945	Reverse MO
ON	Methil to Bergen, Norway for dispersal	Nov 1939 to Apr 1940	"Outbound Norway"
ON	Liverpool to Halifax, Nova Scotia	Jul 1941 to Jun 1945	"Outbound to North America"; 307 convoys; successor to OB series; reverse HX (fast) and SC (slow)
ONM	Milford Haven, Wales, and Belfast Lough, Northern Ireland	Jul 1941 to 1943	
ONM	Atlantic route from Liverpool to New York City	???	Medium-speed ocean convoys
ONS	Liverpool to Halifax, Nova Scotia	Mar 1943 to Jun 1945	Slow convoys; slow element of ON series; successor to OBS; reverse SC
OS	Liverpool to Freetown, Sierra Leone	Jul 1941 to May 1945	"Outbound South"
OSS	Freetown, Sierra Leone, to Takoradi, Gold Coast	Jun 1942	Extension of the "OS" route
OT	New York to the Caribbean (Aruba or Curaçao) and via Trinidad to northwest or west Africa	Feb 1943 to Jun 1944	"Outbound from Trinidad"; 19 convoys; for sending fast tankers to North Africa to support Operation Torch
OT	Curaçao to Trinidad	May 1942 to Jul 1942	"Outbound to Trinidad"; 14 convoys; reverse TO
OT	North Africa to the Dutch East Indies	Nov 1942	Tankey convoys; after Operation Torch; reverse TO
OW	UK, India and Australia, with intermediate destinations	???	
OW	Australia to Ceylon, India and the Middle East	Nov 1942 to Jul 1945	"Outbound West"

== P ==
Convoy	Origin and destination	Dates	Remarks
PA	Persian Gulf to Aden	Sep 1942 to Feb 1945	
PAD	Pointe Noire, Congo via Freetown, Sierra Leone to Dakar, French West Africa	???	
PB	Persian Gulf to Bombay	Sep 1942 to Feb 1945	Reverse BP
PG	Queensland to New South Wales, Australia	Jun 1942 to Feb 1944	Reverse GP
PG	Pilottown, Mississippi, to Galveston, Texas	1942 to 1943	Reverse GP
PG	Panama Canal to Guantanamo, Cuba	Jul 1942 to Aug 1942	Reverse GP; designed to as a response to Operation Paukenschlag
PGE	South from Pointe Noire, Congo	???	
PH	Piraeus, Greece to ports on the heel of Italy	Nov 1944 to Feb 1945	Reverse HP
PH	Leyte, Philippine islands group to Humboldt Bay, Dutch New Guinea	Jan 1945	
PK	Pilottown, Mississippi to Key West, Florida	Sep 1942 to Jan 1943	Reverse KP
PN	Port Said, Egypt to Turkey	???	"Port Said Northward"; reverse NP
PQ	Iceland to ports in the northern part of the USSR	Sep 1941 to Sep 1942	19 convoys; reverse QP; replaced by JW series
PQ	Townsville, Queensland to Port Moresby, Papua	1942	
PR	Piraeus, Greece to Dardanelles ("Rabbit Island") group in Turkey	Feb 1945 to Mar 1945	Reverse RP
PT	Paramaribo, Netherlands Guiana to Trinidad	1942 to 1944	Tanker convoys; Reverse TP
PT	Auckland, New Zealand to Sydney, Australia	Oct 1942	
PT	Pearl Harbor to Tarawa in the Gilbert islands group	Nov 1943 to Jul 1945	Military convoys
PTS	Pointe Noire, Congo via Takoradi, Gold Coast to Freetown, Sierra Leone	???	Reverse STP
PV	Melbourne to Townsville, Australia	Sep 1943 to Oct 1943	
PW	Portsmouth to Wales	Jul 1941 to Jun 1944	Reverse WP

== Q ==
Convoy	Origin and destination	Dates	Remarks
QL	Queensland coast, Brisbane to Townsville, Australia	Jul 1943 to Feb 1944	Reverse LQ
QP	Northern USSR to Iceland and later the UK	Sep 1941 to Nov 1942	18 Arctic convoys; merchant ships loaded with timber; reverse PQ; replaced by RA series
QS	Quebec to Sydney	May 1942 to Dec 1944	Reverse SQ

== R ==
Convoy	Origin and destination	Dates	Remarks
RA	Northern USSR to Loch Ewe and the River Clyde estuary of Scotland	Dec 1942 to May 1945	Reverse JW; successor to QP series
RB	Newfoundland, Canada to Liverpool, UK	Sep 1942	Single convoy (RB.1) of small passenger ships
RED	River Clyde via Gibraltar to the Far East	Sep 1939 to Oct 1939	Two convoys (RED.1 and RED.2)
RJ	Recife to Rio de Janeiro, Brazil	1942 to 1944	Reverse JR
RK	Rangoon, Burma to Arakan, Burma and Calcutta, India	May 1945 to Aug 1945	48 convoys; reverse KR
RK	Colombo, Ceylon to Kilindini, Kenya	Apr 1944 to Jan 1945	Four convoys; reverse KR
RM	Rangoon, Burma via Madras, India to Colombo, Ceylon	Jun 1945	Three convoys; reverse MR
RN	Methil to Norway	May 1945	Military convoys; reverse NR
RP	Dardanelles ("Rabbit Island") to Piraeus, Greece	1945	Reverse PR
RS	Gibraltar to Freetown, Sierra Leone	Feb 1943 to Mar 1945	31 convoys; reverse SR
RT	Cape Town, South Africa to Freetown, Sierra Leone	Aug 1941	Single convoy (RT.1)
RT	Recife, Brazil to Trinidad	1943	Reverse TR
RU	Reykjavík, Iceland to Loch Ewe or Belfast Lough, UK	Dec 1941 to May 1945	169 convoys; reverse UR

== S ==
Convoy	Origin and destination	Dates	Remarks
SB	Sydney to Corner Brook, Newfoundland	May 1942 to Dec 1944	Reverse BS
SB	Allied assault convoys for Operation Husky	Jul 1943	Divided into SBF (fast), SBM (medium-speed) and SBS (slow) elements
SC	Sydney, Nova Scotia to Liverpool	Aug 1940 to Jun 1945	North Atlantic route; slow convoys; reverse ON
SD	Iceland to River Clyde estuary	Apr 1941 to May 1945	Military convoys; reverse DS
SD	Seychelles to Diego-Suarez, Madagascar	1944	
SG	Southend on the Thames estuary to Humber estuary	Mar 1940 to Apr 1940	"Southend to Grimsby"; reverse GS
SG	Sydney to Greenland	Jul 1942 to Mar 1945	61 convoys; reverse GS
SH	Sydney to Halifax, Nova Scotia	May 1942 to May 1945	259 convoys; reverse HS
SHX	Sydney to join HX convoys	Jul 1940 to Aug 1941	
Silvertip	Newhaven to Dieppe	Sep 1944	Military ferry convoys after the break-out following Operation Overlord
SJ	San Juan to Guantanamo	1942	
SJ	Batavia, Dutch East Indies and Singapore to Colombo, Ceylon	Feb 1942	Reverse JS
SJ	Santos to Rio de Janeiro, Brazil	1942 to 1943	
SL	Freetown, Sierra Leone to Liverpool, UK	Sep 1939 to Dec 1944	178 SLF (fast) and SLS (slow) convoys; from May 1943 travelled home with MKS convoys
SM	Singapore or Batavia, Netherlands East Indies to Fremantle, Australia	Dec 1941 to Feb 1942	
SM	Naples, Italy to Marseille, France	Aug 1944 to May 1945	Reverse MS; part of Operation Dragoon and following operations
SN	Sydney, Australia to New Caledonia	1942 to 1945	Reverse NS
SNF	Salerno and Naples, Italy, to North Africa	Sep 1943 to Nov 1944	"South from Naples Fast"; 31 fast troopship convoys; reverse NSF; following Operation Avalanche and follow-on Italian operations
SPAB	Chanel-Port aux Basques, Newfoundland, to Sydney, Nova Scotia	Aug 1943 to Sep 1944	
SQ	Sydney to Quebec	May 1942 to Nov 1944	Reverse QS
SR	Calcutta, India ("Sandheads") to Rangoon, Burma	Dec 1941 to Mar 1942	To reinforce forces holding that country
SR	Freetown, Sierra Leone to Gibraltar	Feb 1943 to Apr 1945	Reverse RS
SRF	South of France to Naples	Sep 1944	Single convoy (SRF.11); returned empty vessels after Operation Dragoon
SRM	South of France to Naples	Aug 1944 to Oct 1944	17 convoys; returned empty vessels after Operation Dragoon
ST	Freetown, Sierra Leone to Takoradi, Gold Coast	Aug 1941 to Apr 1945	Reverse TS
ST	Sydney to Townsville, Australia	Jan 1943 to May 1943	Reverse TS
STC	Freetown, Sierra Leone to Takoradi, Gold Coast and onward to Cape Town, South Africa	???	Part of ST
STL	Freetown, Sierra Leone to Takoradi, Gold Coast and onward to Lagos, Nigeria	Sep 1943 to Sep 1944	33 convoys; part of ST; reverse LS
STP	Freetown, Sierra Leone to Takoradi, Gold Coast and onward to Pointe Noire, Congo	???	Part of ST; reverse PTS
STW	Freetown, Sierra Leone to Takoradi, Gold Coast and onward to Walvis Bay	1943 to 1944	Part of ST; reverse WTS
SU	Suez Canal, Aden and Colombo, Ceylon to Australia	Mar 1942 to Jan 1943	Reverse US; troopships returning troops home for the defense of Australia against Japan
SV	Sydney, New South Wales to Townsville, Queensland	???	Reverse VS
SW	Suez Canal via Kilindini, Kenya to Durban or Cape Town, South Africa	Sep 1940 to Oct 1941	Military convoys

== T ==
Convoy	Origin and destination	Dates	Remarks
T	Hollandia, Netherlands New Guinea to Manila, Philippine islands group	1944 to 1945	
TA	UK to United States	Jan 1942 to Jul 1945	Military troopship convoys using mostly large liners; reverse AT
TA	Tobruk to Alexandria, North Africa	Dec 1941 to Jun 1942	Reverse AT
TAC	Thames to Ostend, Belgium	Oct 1944 to May 1945	242 military convoys
TACA	Thames to Antwerp, Belgium	Nov 1944 to Dec 1944	5 military convoys; replaced by TAM series; reverse ATM
TAG	Trinidad via Aruba or Curaçao to Guantanamo, Cuba	Aug 1942 to May 1945	205 convoys; replaced the TAW series; reverse GAT
TAM	Thames to Antwerp, Belgium	Dec 1944 to Jun 1945	172 military convoys; replaced by TACA series; reverse ATM
Tanker	Gibraltar to Malta	???	British slow convoy operation in the Mediterranean
TAP	Thames to France	1945	Military convoys
TAW	Trinidad via Aruba or Curaçao to Key West or Guantánamo, Cuba	Jul 1942 to Aug 1942	19 convoys; reverse WAT; replaced by TAG series
TB	Trinidad to Bahia, Brazil	Jan 1943 to Jul 1943	Reverse BT
TB	USA to Sydney, Australia	1942 to 1945	Military convoys to build-up forces in South-West Pacific Area command
TBC	Thames estuary to Bristol Channel	Dec 1944 to May 1945	162 coastal route convoys; reverse BTC
TC	Canada to UK	Dec 1939 to Dec 1941	Military troopship convoys delivering Canadian troops; reverse CT
TC	Tunisia to Corsica	Jun 1944 to Nov 1944	Reverse CT
TCU	Caribbean (and New York City) to Liverpool, UK	May 1944 to Aug 1944	Military convoys of tankers, fast merchant ships troopships; counterpart to UC; reverse UCT
TD	Thursday Island to Darwin, Australia	Feb 1943 to Oct 1944	Reverse DT
TD	New Zealand to Northern Australia	1942 to 1944	
TE	East from Trinidad for dispersal	1942 to 1943	"Trinidad Eastbound"
TE	Gibraltar or western North African ports to eastern North African ports	Nov 1942 to Jul 1943	"Torch Eastbound"; after Operation Torch to keep Allied forces supplied
TF	Trinidad to Freetown, Sierra Leone	Nov 1942 to Jan 1944	
TF	Eastern Atlantic and western Mediterranean	Nov 1942 to Aug 1944	7 miscellaneous convoys
TG	Trinidad to Guantanamo, Cuba	1942 to 1943	
TG	Tyne river to Grimsby	Mar 1940 to Apr 1940	2 British convoys
TG	Naples to Anzio	Jan 1944	Single troopship convoy for Operation Shingle
TGE	East from Takoradi, Gold Coast and Lagos, Nigeria for dispersal	Sep 1943 to Nov 1944	18 convoys
TH	Trinidad to Halifax, Nova Scotia	Jun 1942 to Jul 1942	4 convoys; reverse HT
TJ	Trinidad to Natal, Recife or Rio de Janeiro, Brazil	Jul 1943 to Feb 1945	Reverse JT; successor to TB series
TJF	Assault convoys for the Invasion Sicily	Jul 1943	High-speed convoys for Operation Husky
TJM	Assault convoys for the Invasion Sicily	Jul 1943	Medium-speed convoys for Operation Husky
TJS	Assault convoys for the Invasion Sicily	Jul 1943	Slow-speed convoys for Operation Husky
TL	Takoradi, Gold Coast, to Lagos, Nigeria	May 1943 to Aug 1943	14 convoys
TLDM	Takoradi, Gold Coast via Lagos, Nigeria and Douala, Cameroun to Matadi, Congo	Nov 1942 to Apr 1943	4 convoys
TM	Tyne river and Methil, Firth of Forth	Feb 1940 to Apr 1940	Reverse MT
TM	UK to Norway	Apr 1940	British military ferry convoy to reinforce Operation Sickle
TM	Curaçao to Gibraltar	Jan 1943	Single special tanker convoy for the Allied 1st Army after Operation Torch
TM	Taranto to the south coast of France	Aug 1944	Single military convoy supporting Operation Dragoon
TMC	Thames via St. Helen's Roads, Isle of Wight to France	Oct 1944 to Dec 1944	Initiated as the ETC series
TMF	Trinidad to Gibraltar	Dec 1942 to Jan 1943	2 fast convoys after Operation Torch
TMM	Thames to France	Oct 1944 to Nov 1944	Military vehicle convoys; initiated as the ETM series
TN	Townsville, Australia to Port Moresby and Fall River, New Guinea	Dec 1942 to Mar 1944	Reverse NT
TO	North Africa or Dakar to Aruba or Curaçao in the Caribbean Sea	Feb 1943 to May 1943	Tanker and troopship convoys; reverse OT
TO	Trinidad to Curaçao	May 1942 to Jul 1942	
TO	Northwest Africa via the Caribbean Sea (Aruba or Curaçao) to New York City	Nov 1942	Fast tanker convoys returning from Operation Torch; reverse OT
TP	Rosyth to a Norwegian port	Apr 1940	Single British military troop convoy (TP.1) in response to Operation Weserübung
TP	Trinidad to Paramaribo, Netherlands Guiana	Jan 1943	Reverse PT
TP	Tarawa, Gilbert islands group to Pearl Harbor	Nov 1943 to Jan 1944	US military convoys; reverse PT
TR	Trinidad to Recife, Brazil	Jan 1943	Reverse RT
TRIN	Southeast from Trinidad for dispersal	Aug 1942 to Nov 1942	
TS	Takoradi, Gold Coast to Freetown, Sierra Leone	Aug 1942 to Apr 1945	Reverse ST; successor to the LS series
TS	Townsville to Sydney	1943	Reverse ST
TSD	Takoradi, Gold Coast via Freetown, Sierra Leone to Dakar, French West Africa	1943 to 1945	Reverse DST
TSF	Allied assault convoys for the Salerno invasion	Sep 1943	2 high-speed convoys for Operation Avalanche
TSM	Allied assault convoys for the Salerno invasion	Sep 1943	Medium-speed convoys for Operation Avalanche
TSS	Allied assault convoys for the Salerno invasion	Sep 1943	2 slow-speed convoys for Operation Avalanche
TU	UK to the USA	Aug 1943 to May 1944	12 military troopship convoys; reverse UT
TUC	Liverpool, UK to the Caribbean (later New York)	Feb 1943 to Jun 1945	14-kt UC-series convoys of tankers, fast merchant ships troopships
TV	Tripoli, Libya to Valletta, Malta	Nov 1943	Single convoy (TV.7); reverse VT
TV	East from Trinidad for dispersal	???	
TV	Tripoli, Libya to Alexandria, Egypt	Sep 1943 to Aug 1944	41 convoys; reverse XT

== U ==
Convoy	Origin and destination	Dates	Remarks
UA	UK to Azores	Sep 1943 to Oct 1943	Three convoys; associated with Operation Alacrity
UC	Liverpool, UK to Curaçao (or New York)	Feb 1943 to Jun 1945	71 fast convoys of tankers and merchant ships; reverse CU
UCT	UK to New York	???	Troop convoys
UG	USA to North Africa	Oct 1942 to Apr 1945	Military convoys for delivering troops for Operation Torch and follow-on operations; reverse GU
UGF	Chesapeake Bay to Gibraltar and the Mediterranean	Oct 1942 to Apr 1945	26 fast convoys; UGF.1 was the invasion force for Operation Torch
UGL	East Coast of the US to Gibraltar and the Mediterranean	Apr 1943 to May 1943	2 landing craft convoys (UGL.2, UGL.4)
UGS	Chesapeake Bay to Gibraltar and the Mediterranean	Nov 1942 to May 1945	100 slow convoys; reverse GUS
UL	Elbe River to the Humber River	May 1945	Military convoys; reverse LU
ULU	Singapore to Bombay	Feb 1942	Single evacuation convoy (ULU.1) just before the Japanese capture of Singapore
UR	Loch Ewe (later Oban and Belfast Lough) to Reykjavík	Dec 1941 to May 1945	Reverse RU
US	Australia or New Zealand and later Colombo, Ceylon to the Suez Canal	Jan 1940 to Aug 1943	Military convoys bringing troops to the Middle East; reverse SU
UT	United States to UK	Aug 1943 to Apr 1944	US military troopship convoys preparing for Operation Overlord; reverse TU

== V ==
Convoy	Origin and destination	Dates	Remarks
VB	Townsville to Brisbane, Australia	May 1943 to Jul 1943	Reverse BV
VC	Valletta, Malta to Tobruk, Cyrenaica	1943 to 1944	Reverse CV
VK	Sydney, Australia to Wellington or Auckland, New Zealand or Nouméa, New Caledonia	Dec 1940 to May 1943	
VN	Malta to Naples, and then Augusta, Sicily, to Naples, Italy, and finally from Naples to Livorno, Italy	Oct 1943 to May 1945	"Valletta to Naples"; 165 coastal convoys; reverse NV
VS	Townsville to Sydney, Australia	???	Reverse SV
VT	Valletta, Malta to Tripoli, Libya	Oct 1943	Single convoy (VT.7); reverse TV

== W ==
Convoy	Origin and destination	Dates	Remarks
WA	Curaçao to Aruba	Oct 1942 to Jul 1944	
WAP	UK to France	Jul 1944 to Oct 1944	Military convoys for Operation Overlord and follow-on operations
WAT	Key West via Aruba to Trinidad	Jul 1942 to Sep 1942	17 convoys; reverse TAW
WDC	UK to France	Sep 1944	13 military coaster convoys; after Operation Overlord
WEC	Isle of Wight to France	Dec 1944 to Apr 1945	22 military convoys
WEL	Isle of Wight to France	Jun 1944	Landing craft convoys for Operation Overlord
WEP	Isle of Wight to Cherbourg	Dec 1944	Five military convoys
WFM	UK to France	Oct 1944 to Nov 1944	Military convoys, following Operation Overlord
WHX	St John's, Newfoundland to join HX convoys	???	Feeder convoys for the HX series
WMP	Isle of Wight to Arromanches, France	Nov 1944 to Dec 1944	Five military convoys, following Operation Overlord
WN	Clyde estuary (later Oban and Loch Ewe) to Methil on the Firth of Forth	Jul 1940 to May 1945	722 British coastal convoys
WNC	Isle of Wight to Le Havre	Dec 1944 to May 1945	Military convoys
WNL	Isle of Wight to France	Apr 1945 to May 1945	Military convoys
WO	India or Ceylon to Australia	Jan 1945 to Jul 1945	12 troopship convoys
WP	Milford Haven to Portsmouth	Jul 1941 to May 1944	"Wales to Portsmouth"; 547 British coastal convoys
WS	Wabana, Newfoundland and Labrador to Sydney, Nova Scotia	???	
WS	UK via the Suez Canal to Bombay, India, or from South Africa to India	Aug 1940 to Nov 1943	Troopship convoys
WS	UK to Gibraltar, Freetown, Sierra Leone, the Cape of Good Hope and the Middle East or India, or for dispersal	Jul 1940 to Aug 1943	
WSC	Wabana, Newfoundland, to join SC convoys	???	
WTS	Walvis Bay via Takoradi, Gold Coast to Freetown, Sierra Leone	???	
WVC	St Helen's Roads, Isle of Wight, or the Solent to Le Havre in northern France	Dec 1944 to May 1945	161 supply convoys for operations in Belgium and the Netherlands into Germany
WVL	St Helen's Roads, Isle of Wight to Le Havre in northern France	Mar 1945 to May 1945	Seven landing craft and supply convoys for Allied armies fighting in northern Germany
WVP	St Helen's Roads, Isle of Wight, or the Solent to Le Havre in northern France	Dec 1944 to May 1945	151 military personnel convoys for operations in Belgium and the Netherlands into Germany
WX	Western Desert ports to Alexandria, Egypt	???	

== X ==
Convoy	Origin and destination	Dates	Remarks
XB	Halifax, Nova Scotia to Boston or the Cape Cod Canal, Massachusetts	Mar 1942 to May 1945	196 convoys; reverse BX
XC	Chagos and Maldive island groups to Colombo, Ceylon	Apr 1943 to Dec 1944	
XIF	Alexandria or Port Said, Egypt, to Taranto or Naples, Italy	Sep 1943	Troop and military supply convoys in support of Operation Avalanche; reverse IXF
XK	Gibraltar to UK	Oct 1942 to May 1945	Special Operation Torch and subsequent return convoys; reverse KX
XT	Detached from MW convoys to Tripoli, Libya, or plying the route from Alexandria, Egypt, to Tripoli	Feb 1943 to Jul 1944	For operations in North Africa or for Operation Husky; reverse TX
XTG	Alexandria, Egypt via Tripoli, Libya, to Gibraltar	Jun 1943	Two convoys (XTG.1 and XTG.2); reverse GTX
XW	Alexandria, Egypt to Western Desert	1941 to 1943	Supply convoys; reverse WX

== Y ==
Convoy	Origin and destination	Dates	Remarks
Y	Madagascar	Apr 1942 to May 1942	British slow convoy operation for Operation Ironclad, in tandem with the Z fast convoy

== Z ==
Convoy	Origin and destination	Dates	Remarks
Z	Madagascar	Apr 1942 to May 1942	British fast convoy in tandem with Y for Operation Ironclad
ZC	Cristóbal to Curaçao	Oct 1942 to Dec 1942	Five tankey convoys; reverse CZ
ZG	Cristóbal to Guantánamo, Cuba	Aug 1942 to May 1945	141 convoys; reverse GZ
ZK	Brisbane, Australia to Port Moresby, New Guinea	Mar 1941 to Jul 1942	
ZT	New Zealand to Sydney, Australia	???	Reverse VK
