= Dudley Mason =

British recipient of the George Cross (1901–1987)

Dudley William Mason
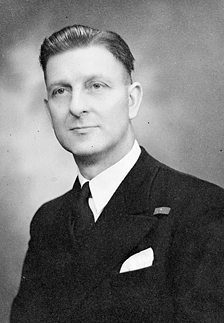
- Dudley W. Mason, GC
- Born: 7 October 1901; Surbiton, England
- Died: 26 April 1987 (aged 85)
- Military career
- Allegiance: United Kingdom
- Branch: British Merchant Navy
- Rank: Merchant Navy Master
- Commands: SS Ohio
- Conflicts: Operation Pedestal, Second World War
- Awards: George Cross; Lloyd's War Medal for Bravery at Sea

Dudley William Mason GC (7 October 1901 – 26 April 1987) was the British master of the tanker SS Ohio during the Second World War. He commanded the tanker during Operation Pedestal, a convoy to relieve Malta. He was awarded the George Cross for this operation.

== Early life and career ==
Dudley Mason was born into a family in Surbiton. His father was a chauffeur. Mason went to school in Long Ditton before going to sea as an apprentice at 17 in June 1920 with Eagle Oil and Shipping Company with whom he qualified as a master mariner at age 30. In July 1942, the 14,000-ton tanker Ohio, belonging to the Texas Oil Company, was requisitioned on loan by the British Ministry of War Transport and placed under Eagle Oil's management; although the youngest of the company's masters, Mason was chosen to captain her "on account of his proven initiative and efficiency and splendid fortitude".

== George Cross action ==
Ohio was one of 14 merchant vessels sent to aid Malta. The convoy, with naval and air escort, met enemy action on 11 August. The next day, when air attacks began, it became apparent the tanker was the main target. For four days the ship suffered continuous attacks from aircraft and submarines. She sustained grave damage from a torpedo, two sticks of bombs lifted her out of the water and another exploded in her boiler room. A Stuka crashed and exploded on her deck, her back was broken and Ohio was twice abandoned and reboarded. In spite of this she reached Malta on 15 August and was carried into Valletta harbour, lashed between the destroyers HMS Ledbury and HMS Penn, and not until the last of the fuel had been pumped out did Ohio settle on the bottom. During the action, Mason and the chief engineer were badly burned and flown back to England for treatment. Captain Mason's GC was not only for his personal courage and determination but for his crew. Other gallantry awards to the crew of Ohio during Operation Pedestal included a Distinguished Service Order, five Distinguished Service Crosses and seven Distinguished Service Medals. After his investiture in September 1942, Mason had a long private audience with the King. He was also awarded the Lloyd's War Medal for Bravery at Sea.

=== Citation ===
St. James's Palace, S.W.1. 8th September, 1942.

CENTRAL CHANCERY OF THE ORDERS OF KNIGHTHOOD.

The KING has been graciously pleased to award the GEORGE CROSS to Captain Dudley William Mason, Master, SS Ohio. During the passage to Malta of an important convoy Captain Mason's ship suffered most violent onslaught. She was a focus of attack throughout and was torpedoed early one night. Although gravely damaged, her engines were kept going and the Master made a magnificent passage by hand-steering and without a compass. The ship's gunners helped to bring down one of the attacking aircraft. The vessel was hit again before morning, but though she did not sink, her engine room was wrecked. She was then towed. The unwieldy condition of the vessel and persistent enemy attacks made progress slow, and it was uncertain whether she would remain afloat. All next day progress somehow continued and the ship reached Malta after a further night at sea. The violence of the enemy could not deter the Master from his purpose. Throughout he showed skill and courage of the highest order and it was due to his determination that, in spite of the most persistent enemy opposition, the vessel, with her valuable cargo, eventually reached Malta and was safely berthed. (The award is dated 4th September, 1942.)

Award of the George Cross.

Master Dudley William Mason, R.M.N., 1113869 Discharge Number

The London Gazette, 8 September 1942

== Later career and retirement ==
Following recuperation after Operation Pedestal, Mason was appointed to command the tanker Empire Cobbett, the only British ship to follow up the American capture of Casablanca in November 1942. After the war, he went to work for Eagle Oil as a marine superintendent, retiring in 1957.

Mason was married twice: in 1924 to Amelia Coates, later divorced; and in 1948 to Vera de Smitt (died c. 1968).
