= Operation Pedestal =

Battle in the Mediterranean Sea in 1942 during WWII

- Part of the Siege of Malta
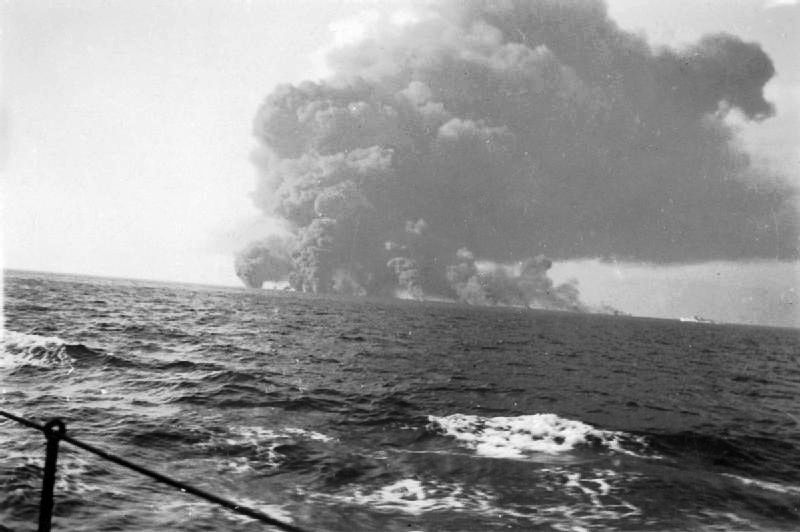
- The column of smoke from Waimarama just after she exploded
Date	3–15 August 1942
Location	Mediterranean Sea 35°N 18°E
Result	See § Aftermath

Belligerents
United Kingdom; United States; Malta	Italy; Germany

Commanders and leaders
(United Kingdom) Neville Syfret; (United Kingdom) Harold Burrough	(Kingdom of Italy) Alberto Da Zara; (Nazi Germany) Albert Kesselring

Strength
4 aircraft carriers; 2 battleships; 7 light cruisers; 32 destroyers; 4 corvettes; 4 minesweepers; 11 submarines; 7 Motor Launches; 14 merchant ships; 2 fleet oilers; 74 fighters; 28 torpedo bombers; land-based RAF aircraft	3 heavy cruisers; 3 light cruisers; 12 destroyers; 23 motor torpedo boats; 21 submarines; 285 bombers; 304 fighters

Casualties and losses
1 aircraft carrier sunk; 2 light cruisers sunk; 1 destroyer sunk; 9 merchant ships sunk; 1 aircraft carrier damaged; 2 light cruisers damaged; 3 merchant ships damaged; 34 aircraft destroyed; 350–550+ killed	2 submarines sunk; 1 heavy cruiser damaged; 1 light cruiser damaged; 1 submarine damaged; 48–60 aircraft destroyed; c. 100 killed or missing

Operation Pedestal (Italian: Battaglia di Mezzo Agosto, Battle of mid-August), known in Malta as Il-Konvoj ta' Santa Marija (Santa Maria Convoy), was a British operation to carry supplies to the island of Malta in August 1942, during the Second World War. (Note: 15 August 1942 was the feast of the Assumption of Mary (Santa Marija) a Christian festival and an important holiday in Malta.) British ships, submarines and aircraft from Malta attacked Axis convoys to Libya, during the North African Campaign (1940–1943). From 1940 to 1942, the Axis conducted the Siege of Malta, with air and naval forces.

Despite many losses, enough supplies were delivered by the British for the population and military forces on Malta to resist, although it ceased to be an offensive base for much of 1942. The crucial supply in Operation Pedestal was fuel, carried by Ohio, an American-owned tanker with a British crew. The convoy sailed from Britain on 3 August 1942 and passed through the Strait of Gibraltar into the Mediterranean on the night of 9/10 August 1942.

The Axis attempt to prevent the fifty ships of the convoy reaching Malta, using bombers, German E-boats, Italian MAS and MS boats, minefields and submarine ambushes, was the last sizeable Axis success in the Mediterranean. More than 500 Merchant and Royal Navy sailors and airmen were killed and only five of the fourteen merchant ships reached Grand Harbour. It was a costly but strategic victory; the arrival of Ohio justified the risks taken; its cargo of aviation fuel revitalised the Maltese air offensive against Axis shipping.

Submarines returned to Malta and Spitfire fighters flown from the aircraft carrier HMS Furious enabled a maximum effort to be made against Axis ships. Italian convoys had to detour farther away from the island, lengthening the journey and increasing the time during which air and naval attacks could be mounted. The Siege of Malta was broken by the Allied re-conquest of Egypt and Libya after the Second Battle of El Alamein (23 October – 11 November) and by Operation Torch (8–16 November) in the western Mediterranean, which enabled land-based aircraft to escort merchant ships to the island.

== Background ==
=== Allied operations ===
General map of Malta

The Allies waged the Western Desert Campaign (1940–43) in North Africa, against the Axis forces of Italy aided by Germany, which sent the Deutsches Afrika Korps and substantial Luftwaffe detachments to the Mediterranean in late 1940. Up to the end of the year, 21 ships with 160,000 long tons (160,000 t) of cargo had reached Malta without loss and a reserve of seven months' supplies had been accumulated. Three convoys to Malta in 1941 suffered the loss of only one merchant ship. From January 1941 to August 1942, 46 ships had delivered 320,000 long tons (330,000 t) but 25 ships had been sunk and modern, efficient, merchant ships, naval and air forces had been diverted from other routes for long periods; 31 supply runs by submarines had been conducted. Reinforcements for Malta included 19 costly aircraft carrier ferry operations (Club Runs) to deliver fighters.

From August 1940 to the end of August 1942, 670 Hurricane and Spitfire fighters had been flown off carriers in the western Mediterranean. Many other aircraft used Malta as a staging post for North Africa and the Desert Air Force. Malta was a base for air, sea and submarine operations against Axis supply convoys and from 1 June to 31 October 1941, British forces sank about 220,000 long tons (220,000 t) of Axis shipping on the African convoy routes, 94,000 long tons (96,000 t) by the navy and 115,000 long tons (117,000 t) by the Royal Air Force (RAF) and Fleet Air Arm (FAA). Loaded ships sailing to Africa accounted for 90 per cent of the ships sunk and Malta-based squadrons were responsible for about 75 per cent of the ships that were sunk by aircraft. Military operations from Malta and use of the island as a staging post, led to Axis air campaigns against the island in 1941 and 1942. By late July, the 80 fighters on the island averaged wastage of 17 per week and the remaining aviation fuel was only sufficient for the fighters, making it impractical to send more bombers and torpedo-bombers for offensive operations.

=== Malta, 1942 ===
Operation Julius, a plan to supply Malta by simultaneous convoys from Gibraltar in Operation Harpoon and from Alexandria by Operation Vigorous (12–15/16 June) was a costly failure. Only two merchant ships from Harpoon reached the island; the Vigorous convoy was forced to turn back and several convoy escorts and many merchantmen, including the only tanker in Harpoon, were sunk. By August, the fortnightly (two-weekly) ration on Malta for one person was 14 oz (400 g) sugar, 7 oz (200 g) fats, 10.5 oz (300 g) bread and 14 oz (400 g) of corned beef. An adult male worker had a daily intake of 1,690 calories and women and children received 1,500 calories. In August, livestock was slaughtered to economise on fodder imports and to grow crops on grazing land; the meat being supplied through Victory Kitchens. Malta would be forced to surrender if fuel, food and ammunition were not delivered before September and Air Vice-Marshal Keith Park, warned that there remained only a few weeks' supply of aviation fuel. (Note: A balanced diet of 1,500 calories could keep a person alive but led to rapid weight-loss and debilitation. The pre-war intake for Maltese civilians not performing manual labour was about 2,500 calories and workers ate considerably more; the calorie intake in Britain never fell below 2,800 during the war. Medicines also ran out and an airman who went sick was asked to choose which medicine bottle he preferred, blue, orange or green. When he asked what was in them, he was told that there were no medicines left, only water with a choice of coloured bottle.)

The fast [40 kn (74 km/h; 46 mph)] minelaying cruiser, HMS Welshman, had been converted to carry fuel; submarines were pressed into service to run supplies of aviation fuel, anti-aircraft ammunition and torpedoes through the blockade, to keep the remaining aircraft operational. The First Lord of the Admiralty Albert Alexander and Admiral of the Fleet Dudley Pound, the First Sea Lord (professional head of the Royal Navy), concurred with the Prime Minister, Winston Churchill, that the loss of Malta would be "... a disaster of [the] first magnitude to the British Empire, and probably [would be] fatal in the long run to the defence of the Nile Valley" and prepared a new convoy operation from Gibraltar, with an unprecedented number of escorts using ships taken from the Far East and from the Home Fleet, which had vessels to spare, since the suspension of Arctic convoys, following the Convoy PQ 17 disaster.

=== Axis command ===
The Axis command structure in the Mediterranean was centralised at the top and fragmented at the lower levels. Benito Mussolini had monopolised authority over the Italian armed forces since 1933 by taking the offices of Minister of War, Minister of the Navy and Minister of the Air Force. Feldmarschall Albert Kesselring of the Luftwaffe commanded German ground forces in the theatre as Commander-in-Chief South (Oberbefehlshaber Süd, OB Süd) but had no authority over Axis operations in North Africa or the organisation of convoys to Libya. Fliegerkorps II and Fliegerkorps X were subordinate to the usual Luftwaffe chain of command. Since November 1941, Kesselring had exercised some influence over the conduct of German naval operations in the Mediterranean as the nominal head of Naval Command Italy (Marinekommando Italien) but this was subordinate to the Kriegsmarine chain of command. German inter-service rivalries obstructed co-operation and there was little unity of effort between German and the Italian forces in the Mediterranean. Kesselring had authority only to co-ordinate plans for combined operations by German and Italian forces and some influence on the use of the Regia Aeronautica (Italian Air Force) for the protection of convoys to North Africa. The Italian Navy resisted all German attempts to integrate its operations; ships in different squadrons never trained together and Supermarina (Italian Naval High Command) constantly over-ruled subordinate commanders.

== Prelude ==
=== Allied plans ===
==== Operation Pedestal ====
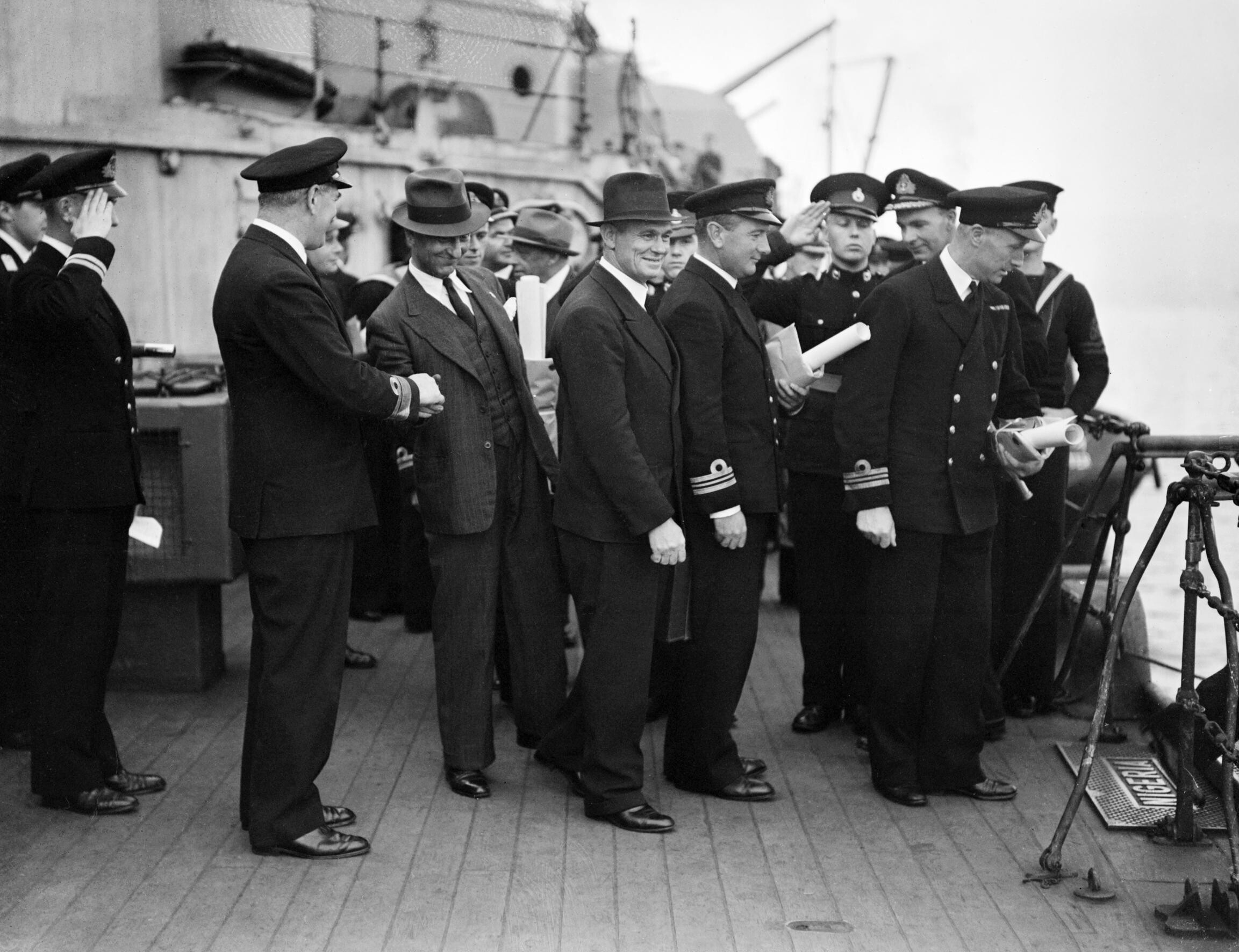
Rear-Admiral Harold Burrough, CB, who commanded the close escort, shaking hands with Captain Dudley Mason of Ohio

Admiralty planning for Operation Pedestal began in late July 1942, under the direction of Vice-Admiral Neville Syfret, rear-admirals Lumley Lyster and Harold Burrough and the Naval Staff. Syfret transferred to HMS Nelson on 27 July when Nelson and HMS Rodney returned to Scapa Flow from Freetown, West Africa. Syfret convened a conference on 29 July for Flag and Commanding Officers of the naval forces for Pedestal at Scapa, to consider the orders for the operation. Several smaller operations were also planned, to be carried out concurrently with Pedestal.

The convoy comprised 14 merchant vessels, the most important being Ohio, the only large, fast tanker available, a US ship loaned to the British, with a British crew. As insurance against the loss of Ohio and its 12,000 long tons (12,000 t) of oil, the other ships were to carry fuel in drums. The convoy was to be protected by two battleships, three aircraft carriers, seven cruisers, thirty-two destroyers and seven submarines, the largest escort force yet.

The combined group was named Force F; the convoy and escorts from Britain as far as the rendezvous, became Force P; the aircraft carriers Victorious, Argus and escorts were named Force M on the voyage to the meeting point. The aircraft carrier Eagle and its escort from Gibraltar to the rendezvous became Force J and the carrier Indomitable and its escorts from Freetown were called Force K. During Operation Berserk, all the carriers and escorts became Force G; Force R was made up of the fleet refuelling vessels RFA Brown Ranger and Dingledale, escorted by four corvettes and an ocean-going tug, RFA Abbeydale a Dale-class oiler; escorts were named Force W also for Operation Berserk, Force X formed the close escort to Malta, Force Z was made up of the heavy ships of Force F, that were to turn back to Gibraltar and Force Y was to conduct Operation Ascendant, a run from Malta to Gibraltar by the two ships that had reached the island during Operation Harpoon and escorts, when Pedestal entered the Mediterranean.

Embarked on Victorious were 809 Naval Air Squadron (809 NAS) and 884 NAS FAA with sixteen Fulmars and 885 NAS with six Sea Hurricanes; on Indomitable, 806 NAS had ten Martlets, 800 NAS and 880 NAS had twenty-four Sea Hurricanes, 827 NAS and 831 NAS had fourteen Albacores. On Eagle were 801 NAS and 813 NAS with sixteen Sea Hurricanes. Based on Malta were five Baltimores, six Photographic Reconnaissance Unit (PRU) Spitfires and five Wellington Mk VIII reconnaissance aircraft. Reinforcements were sent temporarily from Egypt, raising the maximum number of operational aircraft to a hundred Spitfire fighters, thirty-six Beaufighter strike aircraft, thirty Beaufort torpedo bombers, three Wellingtons, two Liberators, two Baltimores and three FAA Albacores and Swordfish torpedo bombers. The convoy was named WS.21S ("Winston's Specials" were troop convoys from Britain to Suez via the Cape of Good Hope). After the usual convoy conference just before sailing, Burrough met with the Convoy Commodore, A. G. Venables, along with the masters of the merchant ships on board his flagship, HMS Nigeria to brief them. A similar meeting was held with radio operators of the merchantmen to explain fleet communications and procedures. Envelopes marked "Not to be opened until 08:00 hours August 10" were handed to the ships' masters, containing personal messages signed by the First Lord of the Admiralty wishing the masters "God Speed". The convoy sailed from the River Clyde on the night of 2/3 August, escorted by Nigeria, HMS Kenya and destroyers, to rendezvous with the other escorts the following morning.

==== Operation Bellows ====
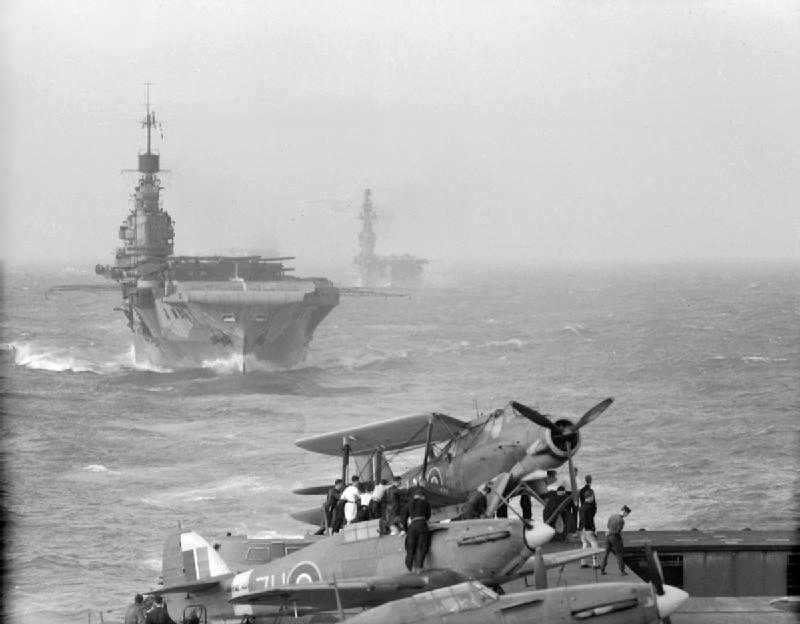
Seen from the flight deck of HMS Victorious, a Fairey Albacore takes off from HMS Indomitable, while HMS Eagle brings up the rear. Eagle was torpedoed and lost during the operation.

Shortly before the departure from Scapa, the Admiralty decided that Furious should carry out Operation Bellows, to reinforce Malta (known informally as a 'Club Run') with Spitfires at the same time as Operation Pedestal. The departure of Furious was delayed by technical difficulties caused by the flight deck, which sloped upwards to a point amidships. A Spitfire made a practice take-off, with wooden wedges in the flaps to ensure a 25° angle and Furious steaming at 30 kn (56 km/h; 35 mph), into a 10 kn (19 km/h; 12 mph) wind. The Spitfire was thrown into the air by the rise on the flight deck, bounced onto the forward slope, fell off the front near stalling speed and narrowly avoided ditching. An immediate request was made to the Air Ministry for constant-speed propellers and two days later, a Spitfire with the new propeller took off easily, leaving 38 aircraft still on board to be flown to Malta. In company with HMS Manchester, she joined Nelson and the convoy three days before the start of Operation Pedestal.

==== Operation Berserk ====
On 31 July, Nelson, Rodney, HMS Victorious, HMS Argus, HMS Sirius and destroyers sailed from Scapa to rendezvous with HMS Eagle and HMS Charybdis from Gibraltar and HMS Indomitable and HMS Phoebe, from Freetown, for Operation Berserk. The operation took place between the Azores and Gibraltar from 6 to 9 August and included exercises with the merchant ships in anti-aircraft gunnery, emergency turns and in changing cruising formations, communicating with signal flags and short range wireless telegraphy (W/T). The risk to security in breaking W/T silence during the exercises, was accepted by Allied planners and according to Cunningham, the convoy attained efficiency in manoeuvring "comparable to that of a fleet unit". The aircraft of the force performed dummy air attacks in the afternoon of 8 August, to exercise radar reporting, the fighter direction organisation and to give anti-aircraft gun crews aircraft recognition practice, followed by a fly past.

==== Operation Ascendant ====
Troilus and Orari, the two merchant ships that had survived Operation Harpoon in June, were to sail from Malta for Gibraltar, with the destroyers HMS Badsworth and HMS Matchless (Force Y) on the night of the first day of Operation Pedestal. The ships were to be disguised with Italian deck markings and sortie from Malta, to 30 nmi (56 km; 35 mi) to the south of Lampedusa, then sail past Kelibia on Cap Bon, keeping close to the Tunisian coast as far as the Galita Channel and from there make for Gibraltar. Force Y left Malta about 20:30 on 10 August, reached Cap Bon the next day and briefly exchanged fire with the Italian destroyer Lanzerotto Malocello which was minelaying. The Italian ship showed French recognition lights and the British destroyers ended the engagement; Force Y arrived at Gibraltar at about 10:00 on 14 August.

=== Axis plans ===
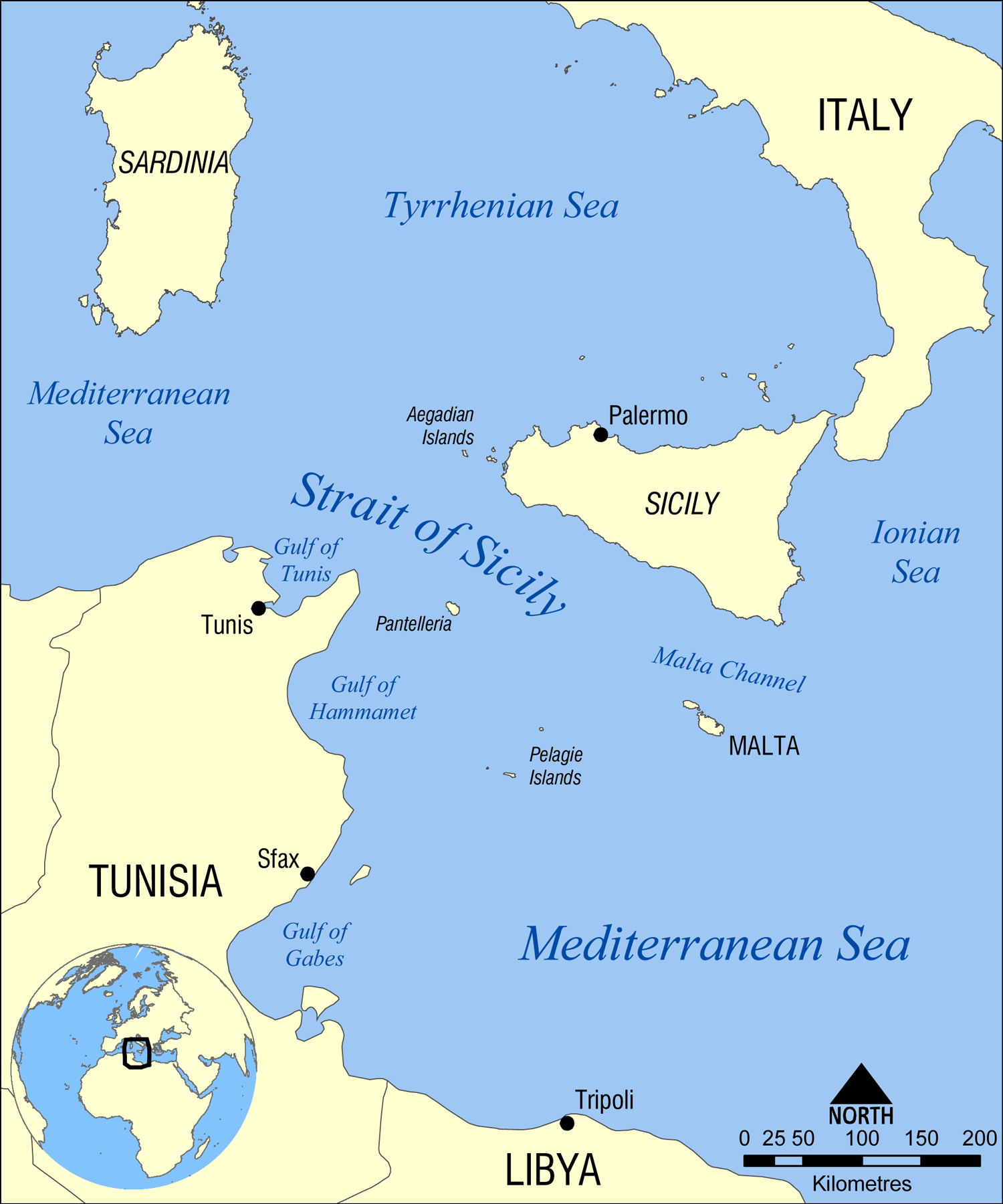
Map of the Strait of Sicily

The Germans and Italians planned separately and although they co-operated to an extent, Fliegerkorps II in Sicily co-ordinated plans with the local Regia Aeronautica commanders but conducted its attacks separately. Supermarina, the Italian Navy headquarters, considered four contingencies, that the Allies would use their naval strength to protect a convoy, the main Allied battle fleet would sortie to provoke a fleet action, to use a powerful covering force for a convoy to force a passage to the north of Pantelleria, instead of turning west at the entrance to Skerki Bank or to use aircraft-carriers for attacks on Sardinian airfields, to ease the passage of a convoy.

The Regia Aeronautica had 328 aircraft (90 torpedo-bombers, 62 bombers, 25 dive-bombers and 151 fighters) and the Luftwaffe 456 aircraft (328 dive-bombers, 32 medium bombers and 96 fighters [most of the Luftwaffe torpedo-bombers had been sent to Norway in June and were too late for the operation]). About 20 Junkers Ju 88s from Fliegerkorps X on Crete arrived at Sicily on 11 August, for operations the next morning and another eight Ju 88s arrived from Crete the same day, after completing convoy escort operations in the Aegean.

The Regia Marina had four battleships, three heavy and ten light cruisers, twenty-one destroyers, twenty-eight torpedo boats and sixty-four submarines but most of the capital ships were non-operational for lack of fuel and air cover. The navy had received only 12,000 long tons (12,000 t) of fuel in June, equivalent to 20 per cent of fuel consumption by convoys and the Italian battleships had to refuel the smaller vessels. Because of the fuel shortage, Mussolini suggested to Hitler that a Malta convoy should be opposed only by submarines and land-based aircraft. Supermarina managed to prepare the 3rd Cruiser Division with the eight-inch cruisers Gorizia, Bolzano and Trieste and seven destroyers. The 7th Cruiser Division conprised the six-inch cruisers Eugenio di Savoia, Raimondo Montecuccoli and Muzio Attendolo, five destroyers, 18 submarines, 19 torpedo boats (six MS and 13 MAS); the Germans had three U-boats and four S-boats.

The Axis air forces lacked the fighters to escort surface ships, bombers and torpedo bombers; Mussolini preferred to use the fighters as bomber escorts and as cover for surface forces. Kesselring rejected the Italian request to provide air cover for the Italian fleet, because the Luftwaffe lacked the fighters. Kesselring doubted that the Italian heavy cruisers could succeed even with air cover and thought that the Italians used the lack of fuel as a pretext. Admiral Eberhard Weichold, the German naval attaché in Rome, wanted the Luftwaffe to provide air cover for Italian ships. Marshal Ugo Cavallero, Chief of the General Staff (Capo di Stato Maggiore Generale), also wanted Italian surface forces to participate but Supermarina did not want its big ships to operate without air cover. Axis tactics were similar to those used against Operation Harpoon in June: a joint special air reconnaissance of the western Mediterranean to be flown by Axis aircraft on 11 and 12 August; Axis aircraft based in Sicily and Sardinia, Italian submarines and German U-boats, and Axis torpedo boats and minefields being used as successive barriers. The four barriers were intended to cause the convoy to disperse and be vulnerable to a force of cruisers and destroyers.

Twenty-two torpedo-bombers, about one hundred and twenty-five dive-bombers with fighter escorts and forty medium bombers were to be used in a synchronised attack. Priority was given to the destruction of aircraft carriers, to prevent them from intervening when Italian surface forces closed in on the remnants of the convoy. The Axis navies had nineteen submarines in the western Mediterranean; nine boats were to be stationed north of Algeria between longitudes 01° 40' E and 02° 40' E. Ten submarines were to wait between Fratelli Rocks and the northern entrance to the Skerki Bank, some arrayed north-west of Cap Bon, to co-operate with aircraft. An Italian submarine was to patrol west of Malta, one off Navarino in Greece and three more about 87 nmi (100 mi; 161 km) west-south-west of Crete.

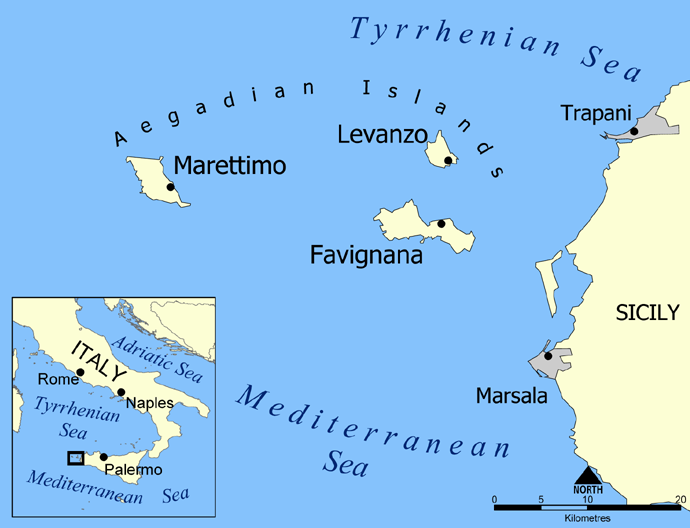
Map showing the Aegadian Islands, west of Sicily (enlargeable)

From June 1940 to April 1942, the Regia Marina had laid about 2,320 sea mines between Cap Granitola at the south-west end of Sicily and Pantelleria, 1,020 mines between Pantelleria and Ras el Mustafa, Tunisia, 6,880 mines between the Aegadian Islands and Cap Bon and 1,040 mines between Bizerte and Keith Rock. The Italians also intended to lay a temporary minefield off Cap Bon on the night of 11/12 August, just before the convoy passed through. On the night of 12/13 August, thirteen MAS, six MS torpedo boats and four S-boats were to lie in wait south of Marettimo (an Aegadian Island) and off Cap Bon, then later to wait off Pantelleria.

The 3rd Cruiser Division and the 7th Cruiser Division would be about 100 nmi (190 km; 120 mi) north of Pantelleria during the afternoon of 12 August and then sail through the night on an interception course south of Pantelleria, to attack the remains of the convoy and its close escort just before dawn. It was assumed that Axis aircraft could provide fighter cover against the larger number of British aircraft from Malta. Should an Allied convoy sail from Egypt, it would be attacked by the 8th Cruiser Division based at Navarino in Greece but the division was ordered into the Ionian Sea on 12 August, to support the 3rd Cruiser Division.

=== Axis preparations ===
Axis planners lacked information about Allied plans but had fair knowledge of the Allied order of battle and the movement of Allied forces inside the Mediterranean, from the reports of ship-watching stations near Gibraltar, reconnaissance aircraft and submarines. Reports from the Abwehr on 5 August convinced Kesselring that the Allies were preparing a big operation to supply Malta from the west, in conjunction with a simultaneous attack on Mersa Matruh in Egypt. Allied bombers from Malta were expected to attack Italian naval forces as Malta fighters covered the passage of a convoy through the Sicilian Narrows. The Germans also considered a threat to Crete when the convoy had reached Malta and Kesselring ordered increased readiness of Luftwaffe units in Sicily and Crete, aircraft being transferred from Crete to Sardinia and Sicily.

Fliegerkorps II reduced operations to increase serviceability, prepared facilities at Elmas in Sardinia for reinforcements sent from Fliegerkorps X in the eastern Mediterranean. The Allies learned through Enigma that the Luftwaffe had supply difficulties in Sardinia, preventing the movement there of long-range bombers and of fighter operations to the extent intended and that the Luftwaffe had sent 40 to 45 long-range bombers and 6 twin-engined fighters from the eastern Mediterranean; Fliegerführer Afrika was forced to divert aircraft for convoy escorts in the Tobruk area. On the morning of 8 August, a report erroneously indicated that an Argus-class carrier and four destroyers had sailed into Gibraltar and Abwehr agents reported much shipping in the Strait of Gibraltar on the night of 8/9 August. By 10 August 220 Luftwaffe aircraft were on Sicily along with 300 aircraft of the Regia Aeronautica and another 150 Italian aircraft assembled on Sardinia.

The Italian submarine Uarsciek sighted the British ships at 04:30 on 11 August; the captain approached on the surface and fired three torpedoes, claiming a hit on the carrier in a 09:36 sighting report and during the evening a Ju 88 photographed the fleet from high altitude, immune to anti-aircraft fire or FAA fighters. The Italian submarines were ordered into three patrol lines to intercept the convoy. On 12 August, Kesselring began discussions with Comando Supremo (Italian High Command) for the co-ordination of Axis forces for the forthcoming operation. During the morning Kesselring reported that the Luftwaffe was fully committed to bomber escort sorties, could not provide air cover for Italian ships and suggested laying mines but the Regia Marina had already laid one. The inability of the Luftwaffe to provide air cover for the Italian fleet greatly reduced its opportunities to intervene but the light cruiser Muzio Attendolo was sent with two destroyers from Naples to Messina. (Note: Admiral Arturo Riccardi mentioned the oil shortage and that in a few months Caucasian oil would be available.)

At an afternoon meeting the surface ships were discussed again, the risk of attack from Malta-based aircraft led Cavallero to decide that the fleet could not be risked without sufficient protection by aircraft. The decision was taken to attack the convoy with submarines between Algiers and the Balearic Islands, torpedo boats between Cap Bon and Pantelleria and then the remnants of the convoy would be finished off by the 3rd and 7th Cruiser divisions General Rino Corso Fougier, the Regia Aeronautica chief of staff, had reported that 40 modern fighters and bombers were available and that the day before, 101 aircraft had transferred from Italy to Sardinia and Sicily, bringing the total to 247 but Superaereo would not begin attacks until 13 August. Radio-controlled bombers would be used to crash onto the aircraft carriers and 20 long-range bombers from Crete and 10 torpedo-bombers from the training school at Grosseto had flown to Sardinia. In Sicily, 15 dive-bomber crews resting from operations were alerted and six Bf 110 long-range fighters were sent from Africa, bringing the Axis total to 701 aircraft. (Note: In 1957, Santoro wrote that 510 Regia Aeronautica aircraft flew in the operations against the convoy, excluding bombers operating against Malta, fighter escorts for the navy, airfield defence and search and rescue aircraft (110 torpedo bombers, 39 medium-bombers, 65 fighters and fighter-bombers, 256 fighters and 40 reconnaissance aircraft, plus a number of naval reconnaissance aircraft). About 340 Luftwaffe Ju 88, Ju 87 and He 111 bombers and torpedo-bombers attacked the convoy and lost 14 aircraft but the records did not contain the number of reconnaissance aircraft involved.)

== Battle ==
=== 9/10 August ===
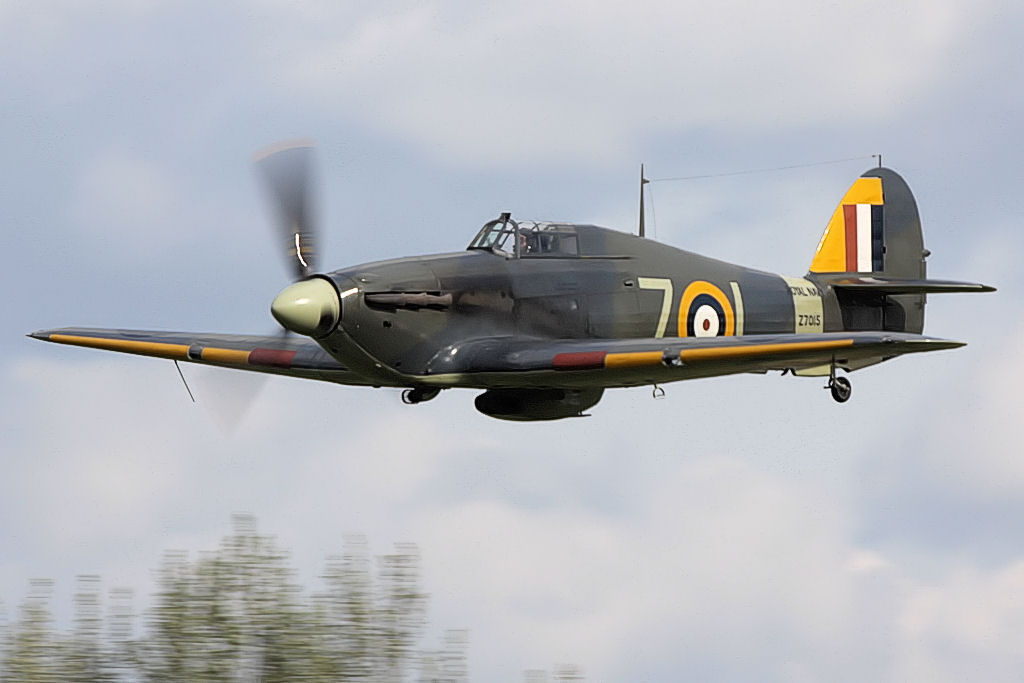
Sea Hurricane (2009)

Force R left Gibraltar on 9 August, ready to meet the convoy at a rendezvous south of Mallorca; Force F made an uneventful passage of the Straits in dense fog during the night of 9/10 August. Fishing boats and one merchant vessel were passed at close quarters but due to the moonless night and the fog, Syfret thought it improbable that the force had been sighted from the shore. Abwehr agents near Gibraltar and Ceuta had sighted the convoy and the British decrypted their Enigma messages, learning how well-informed the Axis were and of their plans to defeat the convoy. At about 08:00 on 10 August, German reconnaissance aircraft detected the convoy and at 12:45 reported that the convoy was about 70 nmi (130 km; 81 mi) north of Algiers.

At 17:00 a French aircraft reported two aircraft carriers, two battleships, two cruisers, fourteen destroyers and twelve merchant vessels about 50 nmi (93 km; 58 mi) north of Oran. Luftwaffe reconnaissance aircraft reported at 19:00 that a convoy of two battleships, two carriers, two cruisers, fourteen destroyers and twelve merchantmen was on an easterly course, 55 nmi (102 km; 63 mi) north-north-east of Oran. By the afternoon of 10 August, Kesselring and Supermarina were aware that a convoy of forty to fifty ships, including possibly two carriers and nineteen freighters, was in the western Mediterranean, sailing on an easterly course at a speed of 13 to 14 kn (24 to 26 km/h; 15 to 16 mph). The convoy was expected to be south of Mallorca by 06:00 on 11 August and south of Sardinia by the same time on 12 August. Fliegerkorps II in the western Mediterranean was alerted and Fliegerkorps X was ordered to reconnoitre the eastern Mediterranean beyond the 25° E line of longitude after dawn on 11 August.

=== 11 August ===
Despite Axis submarines, three cruisers and twenty-six destroyers refuelled from the tankers Dingledale and Brown Ranger of Force R by dawn. (Previous Malta convoys had refuelled on arrival but now the island had no oil to spare.) The convoy was south of the Balearic Islands on course for Cap Bon at daybreak and at about 06:20, a U-boat sighted the convoy. At 08:15 a Luftwaffe reconnaissance aircraft reported that the convoy was 95 nmi (176 km; 109 mi) north-west of Algiers; fifteen minutes later, a Ju 88 began to shadow the convoy at 20,000–24,000 ft (6,100–7,300 m) and continued throughout the day. At noon, the convoy was about 75 nmi (139 km; 86 mi) south of Mallorca, sailing due east on a zigzag course. Furious conducted the flying off between 12:30 and 15:15 of 38 Spitfires for the 555 to 584 nmi (1,028 to 1,082 km; 639 to 672 mi) journey to Malta and then turned round with her escorts for Gibraltar (37 of the aircraft reached Malta).

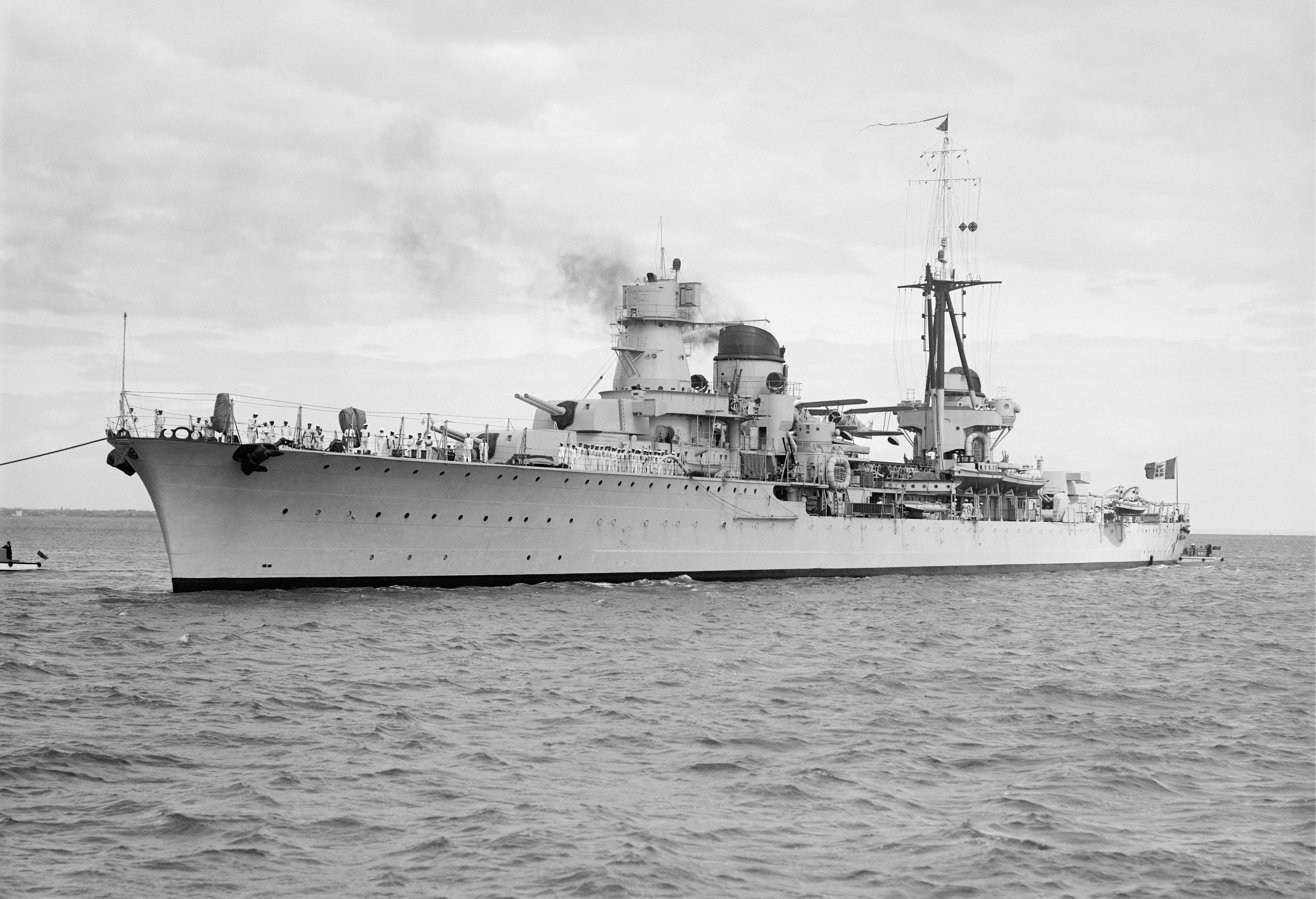
The cruiser Raimondo Montecuccoli

Enigma decrypts showed that at 11:55, the light cruisers Eugenio di Savoia, Raimondo Montecuccoli, Muzio Attendolo of the 7th Cruiser Division at Cagliari had been ordered by Supermarina to be at two hours' notice from 18:00 and that with the heavy cruisers Gorizia, Bolzano and Trieste of the 3rd Cruiser Division at Messina, had been informed at 13:00 that Italian submarines were operating north of Bizerte. Three Axis submarines were seen departing Cagliari at 20:45 and the British learned that at 18:00 the 7th Cruiser Division with seventeen destroyers, had sailed east and that the 3rd Cruiser Division had departed from Messina and Naples. (Note: During the night the RAF at the Malta Operations Room sent orders in plain language to a Wellington bomber, which dropped flares near the cruisers and sent messages in clear, pretending to guide a B-24 Liberator force to bluff the Italian ships away from the convoy. Supermarina had cancelled the operation before the British signals were received, because of a lack of air cover.)

Allied intelligence also learned that Panzerarmee Afrika in Egypt believed that the convoy was a threat to Tobruk. Kesselring thought that a landing on the North African coast might be attempted and next day issued an order of the day that landings by the Allies would influence operations in Africa and must be prevented. Luftgau Afrika (Air District Africa) expected a landing at Tripoli on 13 or 14 August. At 08:00, U-73 sighted ships out of range but behind them another group of merchantmen were followed by the carrier Eagle. She was able to manoeuvre within 400 yd (370 m) and fire four torpedoes which hit Eagle at 13:15, sinking the ship eight minutes later 70 nmi (130 km; 81 mi) south of Cape Salinas, 80 nmi (150 km; 92 mi) north of Algiers. The wreck of Eagle is at 38°05′N, 03°02′E. The destroyers HMS Lookout, HMS Laforey and the tug Jaunty rescued 929 men of the complement of 1,160 but 231 men and all but four Sea Hurricanes (in the air during the sinking) were lost, about 20 per cent of the fighter cover for the convoy.

The German submarine escaped, possibly due to layers of the sea being at different temperatures, affecting the ships' Asdic and after the torpedoing there were frequent false alarms. At 14:30 a Ju 88, one of ten Aufklärungsgruppe 122 aircraft that had shadowed the convoy from 10:10, flew a reconnaissance sortie over the convoy, too high for the Sea Hurricanes to intercept. The Luftwaffe attacked just after sunset at 20:56, when the convoy was about 200 nmi (370 km; 230 mi) from Sardinia, with 27 Ju 88 bombers and three He 111 torpedo-bombers. The Heinkels flew low to drop torpedoes and the Ju 88s attacked out of the dusk in shallow dives, that evaded the fighters but anti-aircraft fire from the convoy shot down two Ju 88s for no loss and then damaged several British fighters as they landed on. During the night the Axis airfields in Sardinia were attacked by B-24 Liberators and Beaufighters, that set a hangar on fire and destroyed several aircraft; a commando raid the same night on airfield in Sicily failed.

==== Night, 11/12 August ====
On the night of 11/12 August, the Italian 7th Cruiser Division and the 3rd Cruiser Division with 17 destroyers, sailed from Cagliari, Messina and Naples to engage the British convoy. The RAF at the Malta Operations Room sent orders in plain language to a Wellington bomber that dropped flares and sent messages in clear, supposedly guiding a fictitious B-24 Liberator force, to bluff the Italian ships away from the convoy. (Supermarina had cancelled the operation before the British signals were received, because of a lack of air cover.) At 00:20, the British discovered from Enigma that Italian intelligence had sighted four British cruisers and ten destroyers and thought that part of the convoy might be proceeding to the eastern Mediterranean. Enigma also revealed operation orders from Fliegerkorps II to the fighters of Jagdgeschwader 77 (JG 77) at Elmas in Sardinia, to expect a convoy in the Sicilian Narrows early on 12 August. Fliegerkorps II was to co-operate with the Regia Aeronautica in Sicily and Sardinia, flying in waves with fighter escorts against the convoy.

British intelligence concluded that the convoy and its huge escort had caused the Axis commanders to be apprehensive of a landing anywhere along the North African coast or on Crete. Axis precautionary measures had been taken on the assumption that if Crete was the target, landings would occur before 14 August. Defensive measures were also taken in the Benghazi–Tripoli area of Libya, where a squadron of Messerschmitt Bf 109 fighters and the long-range bombers based at Derna were alerted to move to Benghazi or Tripoli, supported by Ju 52 transport aircraft. Panzerarmee Afrika prepared detachments to repel landings and moved forces to the Sollum–Mersa Matruh area, to defend the coast east of Tobruk. At 07:00, all ship movements from North Africa to Italy and the Aegean were suspended and by late afternoon, the British knew that the Luftwaffe anticipated a landing at Tripoli on 13 or 14 August. Fighter and dive-bomber reinforcements were sent from Sicily and Enigma intercepted a message from Reichsmarschall Hermann Göring, the commander in chief of the Luftwaffe, ordering that the Luftwaffe

... will operate with no other thought in mind than the destruction of the British convoy ... The destruction of this convoy is of decisive importance.

and that the attacks were to be directed against the British aircraft carriers and merchantmen. At 00:54, HMS Wolverine, part of the escort force for Furious, had been detached with four more destroyers for anti-submarine patrols after the loss of Eagle, detected a submarine at 4,900 yd (2.4 nmi), accelerated, obtained a visual contact at 700 yd (640 m) and rammed the Italian submarine Dagabur at 27 kn (50 km/h; 31 mph), sinking the submarine with all hands.

=== 12 August ===
==== Morning ====
Axis aircraft resumed shadowing at 05:00 and at 06:10, Indomitable sent Martlets to shoot down two Ju 88 reconnaissance aircraft, which proved too high and too fast to intercept. Four Sea Hurricanes and Fulmars took off from the two carriers for air cover and every aircraft was readied to fly. German reconnaissance aircraft kept watch on the convoy, flying too high and fast for the FAA fighters. At 09:15, when the convoy was about 130 nmi (240 km; 150 mi) south-south-west of Sardinia, 19 Ju 88 dive-bombers of Lehrgeschwader 1 (LG 1) were intercepted 25 nmi (29 mi; 46 km) out. Four Ju 88s were shot down and another two were claimed by navy anti-aircraft gunners (German records showed five shot down and two lost over Sardinia from mechanical failure) for the loss of one FAA fighter. The German crews made extravagant claims but did little damage and three Italian reconnaissance aircraft were also shot down. Beaufighters returning from a raid on Sardinia saw the 7th Cruiser Division (Da Zara) at sea and raised the alarm. The cruisers had sailed from Cagliari into the Tyrrhenian Sea at 08:10 on 11 August, escorted by the destroyers Maestrale, Alfredo Oriani and Vincenzo Gioberti, to rendezvous with Muzio Attendolo from Naples.

Early on 12 August, Trieste sailed from Genoa for Naples with the Fuciliere and a torpedo-boat, Ardito, to join the 3rd Cruiser Division, which had left Messina early with the cruisers Gorizia, Bolzano and six destroyers after receiving a signal from U-83 that four cruisers and ten destroyers (MG 3) were close to Crete. The Italian cruisers and destroyers rendezvoused 60 nmi (69 mi; 110 km) north of Ustica off Palermo at the west end of Sicily, some of the ships being short of fuel and then moved south in two squadrons, preceded by the torpedo-boats Climene and Centauro. British reconnaissance aircraft from Malta had flown over Italian ports, a Spitfire pilot saw that the 3rd Cruiser Division had left port and at 18:54 a Baltimore crew saw the Italian ships rendezvous. On Malta, Park was not disturbed until the convoy and escort losses of the day, which depleted Force X; five Wellington bombers were sent to find the Italian cruisers; fifteen Beaufort torpedo-bombers and fifteen Beaufighters stood by.

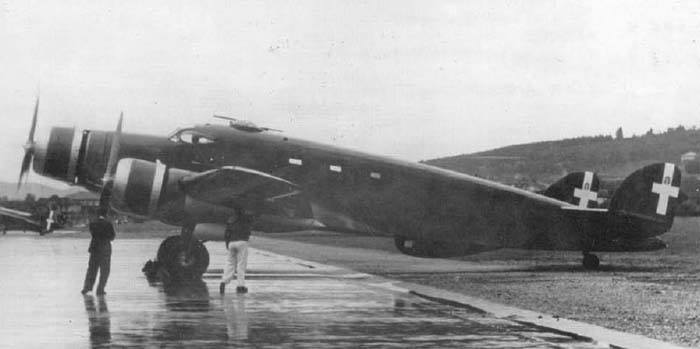
Savoia-Marchetti SM.84 torpedo-bomber

The biggest convoy attack came around noon from Sardinia-based aircraft; a wave of ten SM.84 bombers from 38° Gruppo BT and eight CR.42s of 24° Gruppo CT flying as bombers with 14 MC.202 escorts, followed after five minutes by nine Savoia-Marchetti SM.79s and ten SM.84 torpedo bombers attacking the starboard side of the convoy, escorted by 12 Re.2001 fighters and 21 SM.79s and 12 Re.2001s from the port side, all the bombers aiming for the merchant ships. The second wave had been delayed by 15 minutes due to a shortage of mechanics for the Re.2001s and only 31 aircraft could take off. The bombers were met by an anti-aircraft barrage, the merchantmen took evasive action and none was hit by the bombers that managed to get into range. The third wave comprised a pair of Re.2001G/V fighter-bombers from the Sezione Speciale (Special Section), intended to carry 1,390 lb (630 kg) low-altitude armour-piercing bombs. The bombs were not ready and the aircraft carried anti-personnel bombs; the fighter-bombers were accompanied by a special radio-controlled SM.79, loaded with a 2,200 lb (1,000 kg) bomb and directed by Generale di brigata Ferdinando Raffaelli in a Cant Z1007b11. (Note: The pilot of the flying bomb took off, climbed, set course for the convoy and parachuted.)

The wave was escorted by two of the five G.50 fighters of the 24° Gruppo CT which managed to find the formation. Rafaelli in the Z.1007 guiding the bomb by radio. The radio failed and the SM.79 flew straight on, instead of diving onto an aircraft carrier as intended and crashed into Mount Khenchela in Algeria. (Note: The accident caused much concern to the French authorities in case it had hit a populated area and the Italian Armistice Commission which was relieved to find that the aircraft had been destroyed.) The Sezione Speciale was mistaken for a Hurricane formation and both hit Victorious, one bomb killing six sailors and wounding two, the other bouncing off the deck and exploding over the sea. The first ten SM.84 bombers carried electric Motobomba FFF torpedoes which were designed to travel in an increasing spiral. (Note: Motobomba FFF torpedo: 20 in (50 cm) in diameter and weighing 770 lb (350 kg), 260 lb (120 kg) comprising the warhead.) The torpedoes were dropped 2,000 yd (1,800 m) from the ships, which used the evasive manoeuvres practised in Operation Berserk to escape.

Between the second and third waves of Regia Aeronautica aircraft, 37 Ju 88s from Kampfgeschwader 54 (KG 54) and Kampfgeschwader 77 (KG 77) attacked, having flown from Sicily with 21 Bf 109 fighter escorts, after using radio-countermeasures to blind the British radar on Malta. Five aircraft had turned back with mechanical failures but the rest evaded four Fulmars. Deucalion was hit and forced out of the convoy, escorted by HMS Bramham. The number of Axis aircraft in the attacks was unprecedented, with 117 Italian and 58 German sorties for only meagre results. Two bombers, a torpedo-bomber and a fighter had been lost for one hit on Victorious and the damage to Deucalion. The quantity of anti-aircraft fire had led many aircrew to release their bombs and torpedoes early; the Italian aircraft from Sardinia could refuel and rearm to attack again and a Cant Z1007 and several Luftwaffe aircraft continued to shadow the convoy.

Enigma decrypts showed the British that at 18:30 on 12 August, an S-boat flotilla was due to sail at 16:00 from Porto Empedocle in Sicily for Cap Bon to operate in the area until about 04:30 on 13 August. At 21:45, a Fliegerkorps II assessment revealed that the Axis thought that there were fifty-one ships in the western Mediterranean, including two carriers, two battleships, seven cruisers and twenty destroyers. The Germans mistakenly thought that a US Yorktown-class aircraft carrier was present but correctly identified Rodney and Nelson. The convoy was thought to consist of thirteen freighters of 105,000 long tons (107,000 t), protected by ten to sixteen fighters and plenty of anti-aircraft guns. The Italian submarine Brin was driven off by destroyers and at 09:30 a Sunderland flying boat damaged Giada off Algiers. At 13:34 another Sunderland from 202 Squadron caused more damage but Giada shot down the flying boat before heading for Valencia (until 14 August) with one dead and eight wounded crewmen on board.

==== Afternoon ====
The convoy was approached at 16:30 by Emo, which manoeuvred into position to fire torpedoes at a carrier from 2,200 yd (2,000 m); a sudden course change led Franco to change targets, launch four torpedoes and dive. The convoy had changed course again and the torpedoes missed; observers on Tartar saw the torpedo tracks and raised the alarm. Lookout sped towards a periscope, which was that of Avorio moving into an attack position, and forced it to dive, spoiling its attack; at 17:40, Lookout returned to the convoy. At 16:49 Cobalto was depth charged by HMS Ithuriel while at periscope depth, forced to the surface, engaged by gunfire and rammed by Ithuriel, sinking at 17:02. Ithuriel lost two crewmen who had boarded Cobalto to try keep the submarine afloat; two Italian seamen were lost and the rest were rescued by the British. Ithuriel was badly damaged, lost its Asdic, was slowed to 20 kn (37 km/h; 23 mph) and had to make for Gibraltar. (Note: Ramming was discouraged by the Admiralty, due to the damage that often resulted to the ramming vessel.) Syfret had two destroyers on each flank of the convoy drop depth charges every ten minutes to deter submarines. Force F entered the Italian submarine ambush area C and just after 16:00 HMS Pathfinder obtained an ASDIC contact on Granito, forced it away with five depth charges but then had to return to the convoy. (Many submarine alarms were possibly caused by ghost Asdic contacts, due to the warm waters of the Mediterranean.)

The Regia Aeronautica units based in Sardinia managed to prepare eight Cr.42 dive-bombers and an escort of nine Re.2001 from 362° Squadriglie and nine SM.79 bombers from Decimomannu. The SM.79s failed to find the convoy and a Re.2001 was shot down by an 806 Squadron Martlet from Indomitable. The convoy crossed the 10th meridian, beyond which aircraft based in Sicily could fly with fighter escorts and 105 aircraft prepared to attack in three waves. Problems with the fighter escorts were encountered because the Re.2001s of the 2° Gruppo CT had escorted the Sardinia-based bombers and landed in Sardinia, making them unavailable until the next day. The torpedo- and dive-bombers were sent to Pantelleria to fly with the 51° Gruppo CT (MC.202s) and avoid the problems of co-ordination when aircraft flew from different bases. Four aircraft were sent on reconnaissance sorties; four of the Italian Ju 87s of 102° Gruppo BT were found to lack long-range tanks and torpedoes could not be attached to six SM.84s. Fulmars from Victorious shot down a SM.79 on reconnaissance but a Cant Z1007 maintained contact. Fliegerkorps II arranged to co-ordinate with the Italians but the operations were independent. I Gruppe, Sturzkampfgeschwader 3 (StG 3) had transferred from Trapani to Elmas and at 17:30 hrs, 20 Ju 87s with Bf 109 escorts took off.

==== Evening ====
Italian Ju 87s of 102° Gruppo arrived in poor visibility but at 18:35 the clouds parted. The Italian formation had been detected by radar while 40 nmi (46 mi; 74 km) out and three Martlets, twelve Sea Hurricanes and three Fulmars were airborne but faced MC.202 and Bf 109 escorts, the best Axis fighters. The dive- and torpedo-bomber attacks were well synchronised, the Ju 87s diving as the torpedo bombers approached in three waves at 1,200 ft (370 m). The Ju 87s managed a near miss on Rodney with the 1,100 lb (500 kg) bomb exploding in the sea, one Stuka being shot down by a Hurricane and one by anti-aircraft fire. As the ships manoeuvred to evade the torpedo-bombers, another wave of Ju 87s arrived at 9,000 ft (2,700 m) and bombed Indomitable from out of the sun, hit the flight deck twice and near-missed three times, with 2,200 lb (1,000 kg) bombs, killing fifty and wounding 59 men and seriously damaging the ship, which caught fire and slowed to 17 kn (31 km/h; 20 mph), leaving Victorious as the last operational carrier. By 20:30, Indomitable had worked up to 28.5 kn (52.8 km/h; 32.8 mph) but the damage to the flight deck left it out of action. Aircraft landed on Victorious but those that could not be accommodated were thrown overboard.

Charybdis, Lookout, Lightning and Somali gave assistance to Indomitable and the SM.79 torpedo-bombers were met with concentrated anti-aircraft fire. Twelve of the SM.79s managed to drop torpedoes, at the long range of 3,000 yd (2,700 m); Foresight was hit on the stern, sending crewmen flying through the air. The ship was scuttled the following day. A final Axis attack with twelve SM.79s and 28 Ju 87s cost two Ju 87s shot down and two damaged for no Allied loss; after returning to Pantelleria, the Axis aircraft were strafed by three Beaufighters, which flamed a Luftwaffe fuel depot, destroyed a Ju 52 and damaged two SM79s and an SM.84, also killing an Italian pilot caught on the airfield. The Axis air forces had flown 180–220 escorted bomber sorties during the day and the Germans claimed that they had damaged an aircraft carrier, a cruiser, a destroyer and a large merchant ship. Both sides over-claimed, the British counted 39 shot-down aircraft against the true figure of 18 Axis aircraft lost; three Fulmars, three Sea Hurricanes and one Martlet had been shot down. (Note: The earlier attack was filmed and can be viewed @ 5:00 minutes on the documentary Malta Convoy in the external links section. Nine Ju 88, two SM.79, three Cant Z1007, two Ju 87 and two Re.2001s were shot down according to Axis records.)

The loss of Eagle with its 16 aircraft and the damage to Indomitable which kept its 47 more aircraft out of action, reduced the number of operational fighters to eight Sea Hurricanes, three Martlets and 10 Fulmars, as Force Z was due to leave the convoy, to remain outside the range of Axis aircraft based in Sardinia. Syfret had intended Force Z to turn west upon reaching the Skerki Bank at 19:15 but ordered the turn at 18:55 to get Indomitable out of danger. Rodney was having boiler trouble which slowed Force Z to 18 kn (33 km/h; 21 mph) but because of the number of aircraft involved in the Axis attacks, Syfret thought that there could be no more before dark and that the danger at the Skerki Bank would come from after dawn. About forty minutes after the turn a Luftwaffe reconnaissance aircraft reported the new course; Pedestal was about 250 nmi (290 mi; 460 km) from Malta with no local air cover, because of the four Fulmars left for the convoy, one had been shot down and one damaged by Bf 109s. At 18:55, Burrough, with the close escort of Force X, continued towards Malta with the merchant ships and Force R cruised in the western Mediterranean in case it was needed, until ordered to return to Gibraltar (arriving in the morning of 16 August).

==== Night, 12/13 August ====
At about 20:00, the convoy manoeuvred from four to two columns to pass through the Skerki Channel, the starboard column with Kenya in the lead and Manchester sixth back, the port column with Nigeria leading and Carlisle in the centre, ten destroyers sailing outside the columns. Five Italian submarines were waiting and at 19:38, Dessiè fired four torpedoes at a freighter from 2,000 yd (1,800 m) and heard three explosions. The sound of the detonations turned out to be from torpedoes fired by Axum hitting Nigeria with 52 men killed, HMS Cairo and Ohio blowing a hole 23 ft × 26 ft (7.0 m × 7.9 m) in its side and starting a fire; the crew put out the fire and were soon able to make 7 kn (8.1 mph; 13 km/h). The torpedoing of HMS Nigeria and Cairo (eventually sunk by the British), the diversion of HMS Ashanti to become Burrough's new flagship and the detachment of four Hunt-class destroyers to stand by the damaged cruisers, temporarily deprived Force X of its commander, the two columns of the leaders and deprived the convoy nearly half its escort. On hearing that Nigeria and Cairo, which were equipped as Fighter Direction ships, had been torpedoed, Syfret ordered Force Z to send back HMS Charybdis, also fitted for fighter direction, with HMS Eskimo and HMS Somali to reinforce Force X. Nigeria and the other damaged ships turned back to Gibraltar, escorted by HMS Derwent, Wilton and Bicester.

KG 54 and KG 77 dispatched 30 Ju 88s with seven He 111 torpedo-bombers from 6/KG 26, escorted by six Bf 110s of 6/ZG 26 and the destroyers were still with the damaged ships and when the raid was detected by radar at 20:35; six long-range Beaufighters of 258 Squadron arrived and were also fired on by the convoy gunners. Ashanti and HMS Penn laid a smokescreen to cover the light western horizon, the sun having set at 20:10 but the reduced anti-aircraft firepower of the convoy and escorts failed to prevent the attack. After thirty minutes Brisbane Star was stopped, hit in the bows (possibly by the Italian submarine Alagi), eventually to continue at 5 kn (5.8 mph; 9.3 km/h). Clan Ferguson was torpedoed and set ablaze, later to be destroyed by an ammunition detonation, Rochester Castle was damaged and Empire Hope was sunk by a destroyer after rescuing the crew. At 21:05 Alagi fired a salvo of four torpedoes at Kenya, the tracks of which were seen on Port Chalmers and reported. Kenya turned sharply and avoided three of the torpedoes but the fourth hit aft on the starboard side; Kenya was able to keep up but this left Force X with Manchester as the only undamaged cruiser. Bronzo reported that it had sunk Deucalion and the captain of Kenya described the state of the convoy as "chaotic". At 21:30, the commander of Alagi reported that he had sunk the merchant ship Empire Hope, damaged Kenya and that

... from 180 degrees around to 140 degrees we could see a continuous line of flame from the burning, sinking ships ... A burning ship blows up.

— Sergio Puccini

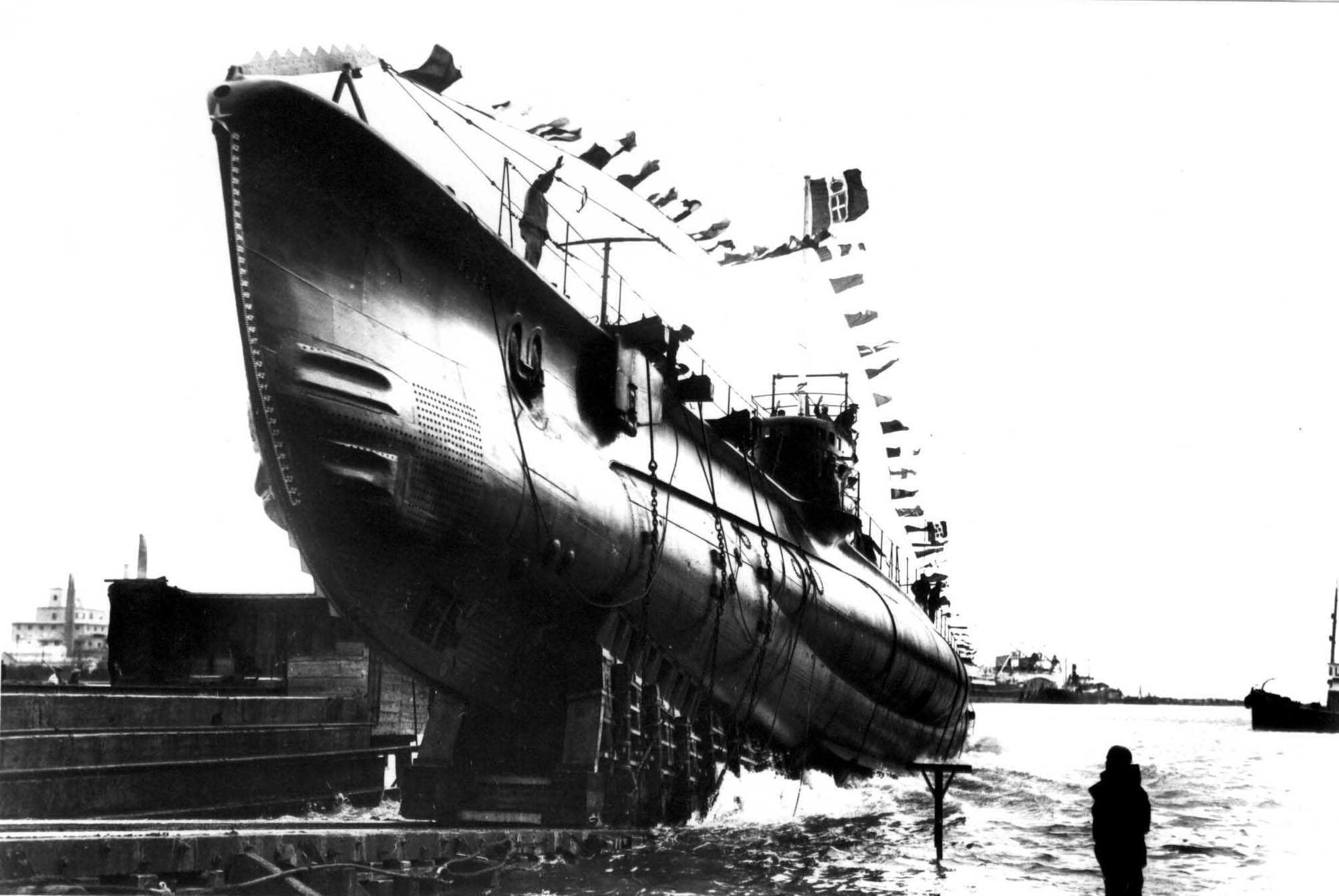
Launch of Alagi at Monfalcone

At 23:56, the convoy passed south of Zembra island towards Kelibia on Cap Bon, to avoid the minefields between Africa and Sicily, still out of formation. Three minesweeping destroyers sailed ahead, followed by the cruisers Kenya, Manchester and two freighters. Charybdis and the destroyers Eskimo and Somali from Force Z were still some hours behind and Ashanti was steaming fast to overhaul the main body. Three destroyers remained with nine of the merchantmen and Bramham was en route after Deucalion had been sunk. The main part of the convoy was attacked at 00:40 by four boats of the German III Squadron and 13 torpedo boats of the Italian 18° MAS, 2° MS and 20° MAS, which made 15 attacks; the long line of merchant ships and the reduced number of escort ships providing an easy target. (Note: 3rd Squadron, S 59, S 58, S 30 and S 36; 18th MAS, MAS 556, MAS 560, MAS 562 and MAS 557; 2nd MS, MS 16, MS 22, MS 23, MS 25 and MS 26; 20th MAS, MAS 552, MAS 553, MAS 554, MAS 564.) The 18° MAS detected the convoy on radar, south-east of Pantelleria and attacked the escorts at the head of the procession, coming under fire, as they fired torpedoes to no effect. The Italian boats then attacked the merchant ships.

The convoy was vulnerable because the lighthouse at Cap Bon revealed their position about 10 nmi (19 km; 12 mi) offshore. S 58 and S 59 sighted the first ships at 00:20, attacked and S 58 was damaged, turning away for Porto Empedocle. S 59 attacked and claimed a freighter about 5 nmi (5.8 mi; 9.3 km) north-east of Cap Bon but no ships were hit there. At 01:02 near Ras Mustafa south of Kelibia, MS 16 or MS 22 attacked the convoy to no effect but then attacked Manchester from close range and each scored a hit, flooding its boilers, fuel tanks and magazines and wrecking three of its four propeller shafts, the ship taking on a 12° list until counter-flooding reduced the list to 5°. Waimarama, Almeria Lykes and Glenorchy following on, swerved around Manchester and lost formation. Glenorchy mistakenly claimed the destruction of a torpedo boat and the two MAS boats ran aground in Tunisia. Power was restored on Manchester and 156 men were taken on board Pathfinder but at 05:00, the captain ordered the ship be scuttled and the remaining crew to make for the Tunisian coast. (Note: Manchester was the largest ship sunk by motor torpedo boats during the war; 568 survivors were rescued by Allied or Vichy forces and 132 men were killed or missing. The crew who landed in Vichy-controlled Tunisia were interned until after Operation Torch, after which a Court Martial ruled that the scuttling had been premature.)

Between 03:15 and 04:30 about 15 nmi (17 mi; 28 km) off Kelibia, the torpedo boats hit and sank Wairangi, Almeria Lykes (US), Santa Elisa (US) and Glenorchy, as they took a short cut to catch up with the convoy. Rochester Castle was torpedoed but escaped at 13 kn (15 mph; 24 km/h) and caught up with the main body by 05:30, by when Charybdis, Eskimo and Somali had arrived, increasing the escort to two cruisers and seven destroyers around Rochester Castle, Waimarama and Melbourne Star. Ohio and its destroyer were slowly closing the distance and farther back were Port Chalmers and two destroyers. Dorset was sailing independently and Brisbane Star lurked near the Tunisian coast, ready to make a run for Malta after dark. Dawn brought an end to the torpedo boat attacks and at 07:30, Burrough sent Eskimo and Somali back to help Manchester but they arrived too late, took on survivors who had not reached the shore and made for Gibraltar.

=== 13 August ===
==== Morning ====
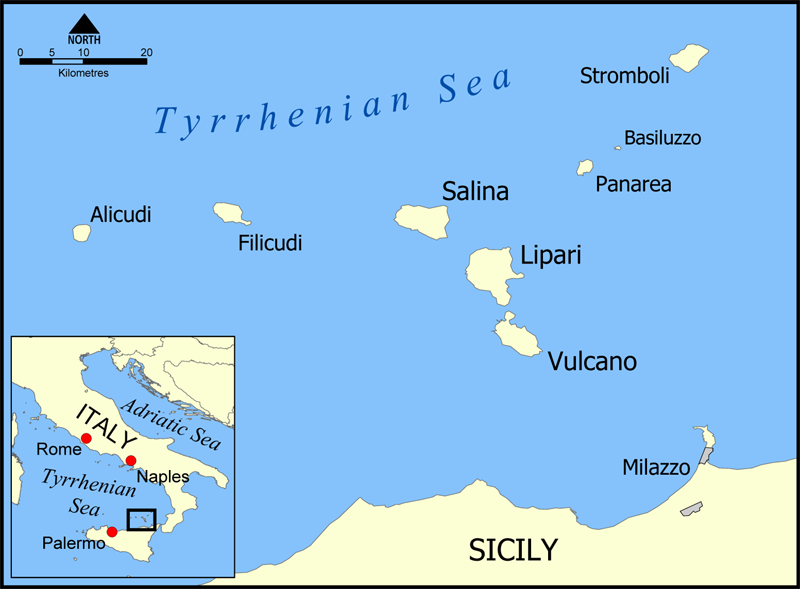
Aeolian Islands, off the north coast of Sicily

An attack by the Italian cruisers appeared imminent, after air reconnaissance had sighted them the previous evening, heading south about 80 nmi (150 km; 92 mi) from the west end of Sicily, on course to reach the convoy at dawn. At 01:30 the cruisers had turned east and run along the north coast of Sicily; British aircraft from Malta had conducted a ruse to decoy the cruisers but the main attacking force on Malta was held back, in case the Italian battleships sailed from Taranto. Some of the Italian cruisers were ordered to return to port and the rest were sent through the Straits of Messina to join the 8th Cruiser Division against the MG 3 decoy convoy in the eastern Mediterranean. Unbroken had been waiting since 10 August 2 nmi (2.3 mi; 3.7 km) north of the Capo Milazzo lighthouse and after being attacked, moved close to Stromboli, arriving early on 13 August. The Italian cruisers were heard first by hydrophone and then seen through the periscope at 07:25, heading north between the islands of Filicudi and Panarea. The ships were making 20 kn (37 km/h; 23 mph) with eight destroyer escorts and two CANT Z.506 aircraft overhead. Her commander raised the periscope for only short periods, to avoid being seen by the destroyers and the Cants, while manoeuvring into an attack position.

At 08:05, the cruisers slowed to 18 kn (33 km/h; 21 mph) for Gorizia to fly off a seaplane and then the destroyer Fuciliere machine-gunned a periscope seen at 450 yd (410 m). The Italian destroyers chased several sonar contacts and three sailed within 1,000 yd (910 m) of Unbroken, which fired four torpedoes after they had passed by. Unbroken dived to 80 ft (24 m) and after 2.15 minutes, an explosion was heard followed by a second after another 15 seconds. Observers on Gorizia and Bolzano had seen torpedo tracks and Gorizia was turned sharply but Bolzano was hit while beginning its turn. The deck crew of Muzio Attendolo had not seen the torpedo tracks or received the alert from Fuciliere and the ship took evasive action only after Bolzano was hit, which was too late. Unbroken descended to 120 ft (37 m) and commenced silent running; Fuciliere (carrying sonar) and Camica Nera slowed to hunt the submarine. The destroyers detected Unbroken at 08:45 and accurately dropped 105 depth charges in the next 45 minutes but at too shallow a depth. Two destroyers escorted Gorizia and Trieste to Messina and five remained with Bolzano and Muzio Attendolo, periodically dropping depth charges as a deterrent.

Muzio Attendolo was hit forward and 82 ft (25 m) of its bow was blown open but suffered no fatalities. The ship was towed towards Messina but when the bow fell off, the ship managed to sail on at 5 kn (5.8 mph; 9.3 km/h), escorted by Grecale, Ascari and later Freccia, reaching Messina at 18:54. Bolzano was struck amidships, six engine rooms and a magazine flooded and a fire started, the commander of the 11th Destroyer Flotilla being ordered to tow the ship and run it aground on Panarea. Bolzano burned until the next day, watched over by Italian fighters and after a month of repairs, was towed to Naples. Muzio Attendolo was damaged for the duration of the war. After remaining submerged for ten hours, Unbroken surfaced and was recalled to Malta. (Supermarina had re-routed the cruiser force after a submarine (Unbroken) had been detected, which had been predicted by Mars, enabling him to forestall the Italians, who broke orders by not zigzagging and by slowing. After the incident, Supermarina assumed that the submarine had escaped because Italian depth charges were not powerful enough, rather than the sonar-equipped ships had been hampered by the turbulence of destroyer wakes and depth charge explosions.)

The aerial torpedo caught in Port Chalmers's paravane.

At 07:00 the convoy was about 120 nmi (220 km; 140 mi) from Malta and Axis reconnaissance accurately reported four freighters, two cruisers and seven destroyers but not five more destroyers. Trailing behind were Dorset and Port Chalmers with two destroyers and two more off to the west. Brisbane Star was in the Gulf of Hammamet and six British submarines were south of Pantelleria. Fliegerkorps II sent 26 Ju 88s in several waves and at 09:15, 16 Ju 87s escorted by eight Bf 109s and eight Bf 110s attacked. Ten Ju 88s of II/LG 1 near missed Ohio and hit Waimarama which disintegrated; the aviation fuel on deck burst into flame and one of the bombers was destroyed in the explosion. HMS Ledbury passed through the fires, rescuing 27 survivors of the ship's complement of 107 men.

The wreckage of Waimarama showered flaming debris on Melbourne Star and several of her crew abandoned ship prematurely, some of whom were later rescued by Ledbury. At 09:23, eight Italian Ju 87s with ten MC.202 escorts attacked and a Stuka was shot down and crashed onto Ohio, another was shot into the sea and a Spitfire was shot down, either by a MC.202 or navy anti-aircraft fire. Rochester Castle was damaged by a near miss from a Ju 88 and Dorset was hit by Stukas of I/StG 3 and abandoned. The attackers lost two Ju 87s and a Bf 109 and a Beaufighter was shot down. Port Chalmers was hit and at 11:25, five SM.79 torpedo-bombers, with 14 MC.202 escorts, attacked and the crew found a torpedo caught in the starboard paravane, which exploded harmlessly. An SM.79 was shot down by a Spitfire and two destroyers were left behind with the disabled ships.

==== Afternoon ====
The remnants of the convoy steamed on to meet the four minesweepers and seven motor minesweepers of the 17th Minesweeper Flotilla of the Malta Escort Force at 14:30. Melbourne Star, Port Chalmers and Rochester Castle reached Grand Harbour at Valletta at 16:30, where Operation Ceres, the immediate unloading of the ships began. Another air attack at dusk by 14 Ju 87s, sank Dorset but when the main body was within 80 nmi (150 km; 92 mi) of Malta, 18 Ju 88s were recalled in the face of 407 Spitfire sorties from the island. Penn tried to tow Ohio but the tanker was listing and snapped the tow line; in a later attack, a bomb hit the same area as a previous torpedo hit and broke Ohio's keel. The last ship to arrive, Brisbane Star evaded a U-boat and managed to steam at 5–9 kn (9.3–16.7 km/h; 5.8–10.4 mph) despite the damage to its bows. Off Tunisia, Brisbane Star was attacked by two SM.79 torpedo bombers, whose torpedoes turned out to be duds.

The ship evaded Italian MAS boats; it was then boarded by the Sousse harbour master, who tried to impound the vessel until persuaded to relent and let the ship sail on after dark. Ledbury was attacked by two SM.79s but shot them down. Force X had turned for Gibraltar at 16:00 with the cruisers Charybdis, Kenya and five destroyers; Fliegerkorps II made a maximum effort against the force, which made it easier for the remaining merchant ships to reach Malta. Force X was attacked by 35 Ju 88s and 13 Ju 87s, achieving only a near miss on Kenya for a loss of a Ju 88 and a Stuka. The Regia Aeronautica attacked with 15 bombers and 20 torpedo-bombers for no loss and during the afternoon, Force X met Force Z, the ships being attacked by aircraft, submarines and light craft; Foresight was scuttled by Tartar when it could no longer sail. Eskimo and Somali, carrying survivors from Manchester were the last to reach Gibraltar at 17:30 on 15 August.

==== Operations MG 3 and MG 4 ====
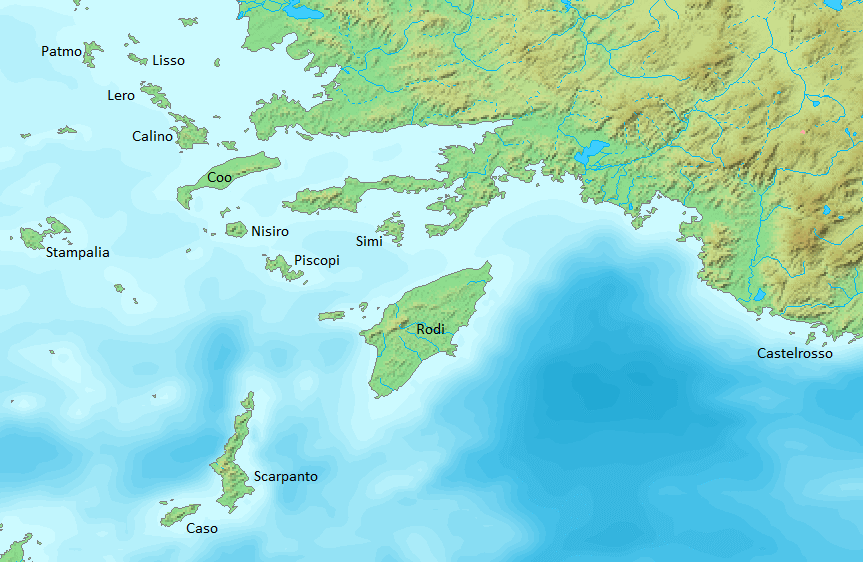
Rhodes in the Dodecanese Islands

In the eastern Mediterranean, the decoy operation MG 3 had begun when convoy MW12 with three freighters had sailed from Port Said after dusk on 10 August. The merchant ships were escorted by two cruisers, ten destroyers and two smaller escorts and another merchant ship escorted by two cruisers and three destroyers left Haifa at 03:00 the next day. The two forces rendezvoused early on 11 August and sailed west to the longitude of Alexandria, then turned back. U-83 had reported that four cruisers and ten destroyers were close to Crete and a message from a Sunderland was intercepted. Reconnaissance reports from Malta noted a smokescreen over Valletta, apparently to conceal two cruisers; this was later taken to mean that the British were hiding the departure of ships heading westwards towards the convoy. The large size of the convoy was interpreted by Supermarina to imply an operation in the eastern Mediterranean and prepared to reinforce the 8th Cruiser Division at Navarino.

German aircraft had spotted the movements and early on 12 August, Kesselring informed Fliegerkorps X that four merchant vessels, six cruisers and an unknown number of destroyers were at 33° 40' N, 28° 34' E, sailing north-east at 12 kn (14 mph; 22 km/h). Kesselring thought that the convoy was a British wireless-telegraphy spoof but might also be a supply convoy for Malta and Fliegerkorps X was ordered to reconnoitre all of the eastern Mediterranean on the morning of 12 August but no aircraft were available to cover the Italian cruisers, operations against the convoy taking priority. During the night of 12/13 August, the cruisers HMS Arethusa and HMS Cleopatra with four destroyers conducted Operation MG 4, a bombardment of Rhodes port on the island of Rhodes. During the day, the RAF attacked Maritsa airfield on Rhodes and a British submarine landed Commandos on the east coast of Sicily (a False Nose Job) at Simeto south of Catania, to sabotage electricity pylons. The Italian 8th Cruiser Division remained in port and the Germans detached a destroyer to reinforce the Italians; local traffic along the North African coast and shipping between Italy and Greece was suspended but MG 3 failed to divert Axis attention from Operation Pedestal.

=== 14–15 August ===
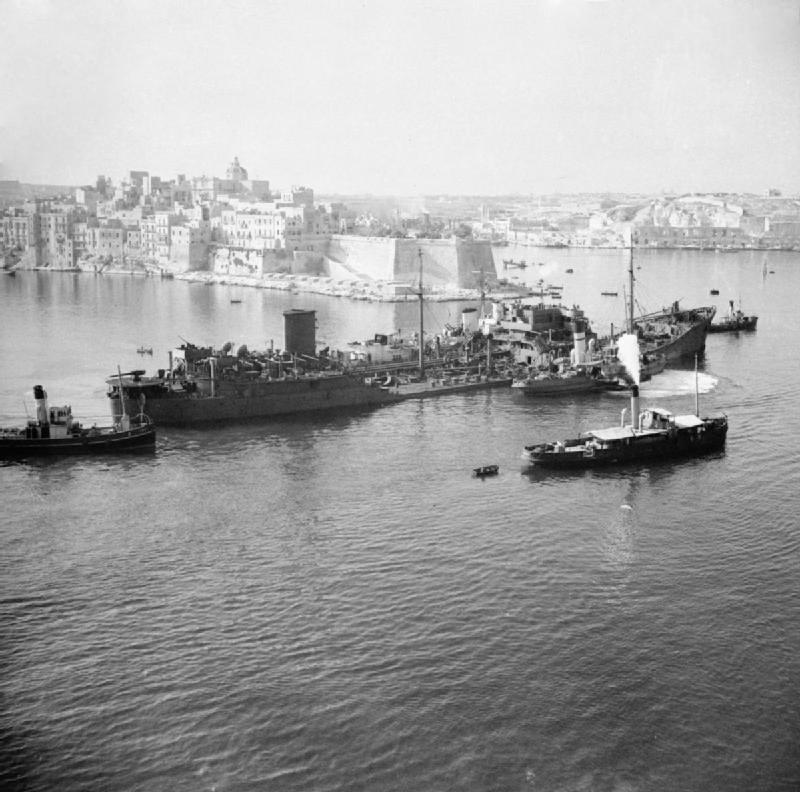
The stricken SS Ohio enters Grand Harbour, Malta, on 15 August 1942

On the afternoon of 14 August, Brisbane Star arrived at Valletta Harbour with Spitfires circling overhead. Ohio was surrounded by ships to nurse the tanker to Grand Harbour and several American volunteers from Santa Eliza manned anti-aircraft guns on Ohio during the tow. The weight of the tanker kept breaking the tow lines, while constant air attacks were made by 20 bombers that destroyed the rudder, made a hole in her stern and brought the decks awash. The tanker was towed in by the destroyers Ledbury and Penn lashed on either side, with the minesweeper HMS Rye acting as a stabiliser at the stern. More air attacks disrupted the towing formation, until it was re-established with Bramham replacing Ledbury for the remainder of the journey.

Ohio was towed into Grand Harbour at 09:30 on 15 August, to cheering crowds and a band playing Rule Britannia. The crowd fell silent as the ships entered harbour, men removed their hats, women crossed themselves and a bugle sounded Still. The tanker discharged oil into two tankers and water was pumped in at the same time, to reduce the chance of structural failure. Ohio settled on the bottom just as the last of the fuel was emptied. (Note: On 19 September 1946, the halves of Ohio were towed out to sea and sunk.) The surviving ships' cargo was unloaded in Malta by about 3,000 soldiers before being transferred to guarded stores. Some supplies were looted in the process; the looters included police officers, watchmen, British soldiers and Maltese civilians.

== Aftermath ==
=== Analysis ===
German reports on 17 August claimed that all the tankers in the recent Mediterranean convoy had been sunk and none of the transports had reached their destination (assumed to be Egypt). The Allies had lost thirteen vessels, including nine merchantmen, one aircraft carrier (Eagle), two cruisers (Manchester and Cairo) and a destroyer (Foresight) but the Royal Navy and the Merchant Navy had saved Malta. The arrival of about 29,000 long tons (32,000 short tons) of general cargo, together with petrol, oil fuel, kerosene and diesel fuel, was enough to give the island about ten weeks' supply beyond the few weeks that the existing stocks would last. Axis propaganda broadcasts made extravagant claims but a Kriegsmarine report noted the incomplete and contradictory evidence, allowing only a provisional conclusion. The arrival of four merchant ships and a tanker was unsatisfactory, because the revival of Malta as an offensive base would affect Axis supply routes in what might be the "decisive phase of the struggle for North Africa". Supermarina reached the same conclusion and Generale Giuseppe Santoro, deputy chief of staff of the Regia Aeronautica, wrote that the British had achieved a strategic success by bringing Malta back into action "in the final phase of the struggle in Egypt".

In August, with Malta still besieged, 35 per cent of Axis convoy shipping to North Africa was lost. Later that year, Admiral Eberhard Weichold summed up the Kriegsmarine view,

.... To the continental observer, the British losses seemed to represent a big victory for the Axis, but in reality the facts were quite different, since it had not been possible to prevent a British force, among which were five merchant vessels, from reaching Valletta.... Thanks to these new supplies Malta was now capable of fighting for several weeks, or, at a pinch, for several months. The main issue, the danger of air attack on the supply route to North Africa, remained. To achieve this objective no price was too high, and from this point of view the British operation, in spite of all the losses, was not a defeat, but a strategical failure of the first order by the Axis, the repercussions of which will one day be felt...

In 1994, James Sadkovich wrote that Operation Pedestal was a tactical disaster for the British and that it was of a magnitude comparable to the German attack on Convoy PQ 17 in the Arctic, about a month earlier. In 2000, Richard Woodman called Operation Pedestal a strategic victory, raising the morale of the people and garrison of Malta, averting famine and an inevitable surrender. In 2002, Giorgio Giorgerini wrote that the operation was an Italian success; Italian submarines had adopted more offensive tactics and sunk a cruiser and two merchantmen, damaged two cruisers and the tanker Ohio. In 2002, Jack Greene and Alessandro Massignani called the convoy operation the last Axis victory in the Mediterranean but that it was a tactical not a strategic success. The arrival of Ohio justified the convoy despite the loss of nine of the merchant ships (one in Valletta harbour). Axis shipping had been suspended during the operation, partly because the transport Ogaden had been sunk off Derna on 12 August, by HMS Porpoise and after Ohio arrived, Axis ships had to make longer journeys. On 15 August, Lerici was also sunk by Porpoise and on 17 August, Pilo was sunk by aircraft and the tanker Pozarica was sunk on 21 August.

=== Casualties ===
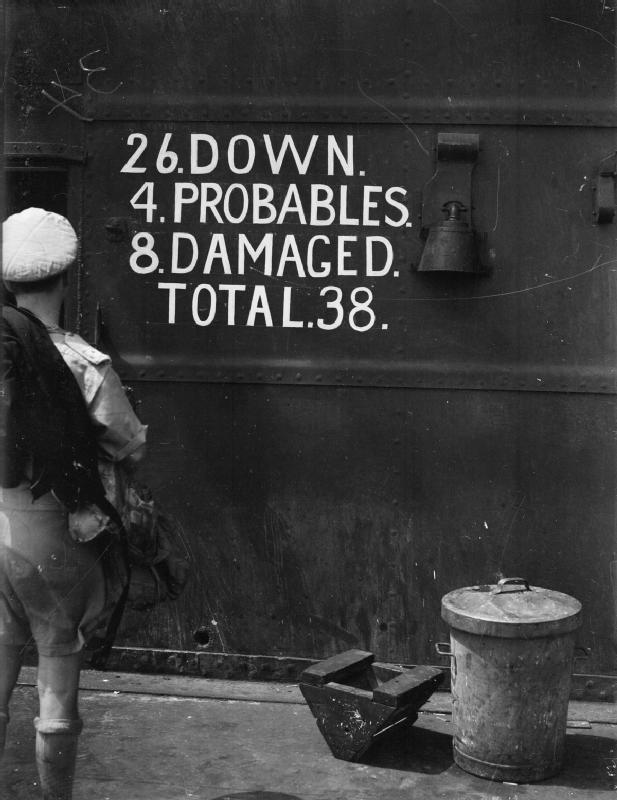
Score-board for HMS Indomitable's air group painted on the island, 38 Axis aircraft claimed destroyed or damaged.

In 2003, Ian Malcolm listed 160 men killed on Eagle, 132 on Manchester, 52 on Nigeria, 50 on Indomitable, 24 on Cairo, five on Foresight and three men on Kenya. Merchant Navy casualties were 83 on Waimarama, eighteen on Clan Ferguson, seven on Glenorchy, five on Melbourne Star, four on Santa Elisa, one each on Deucalion, Ohio and Brisbane Star.

Ohio never sailed again and the British lost the carrier Eagle, the cruisers Manchester and Cairo and the destroyer Foresight. The carrier Indomitable, the cruisers Nigeria and Kenya and three destroyers were damaged and under repair for some time. On the Axis side, the Italian cruisers Bolzano and Muzio Attendolo were damaged and were not operational for the rest of the war, the Italian submarines Cobalto and Dagabur were sunk, the Italian submarine Giada and the German E-Boat S 58 were damaged.

Fliegerkorps II sent 650 sorties against Pedestal from 11 to 14 August and claimed twelve aircraft shot down for eighteen losses. Total Axis losses were 62 aircraft, 42 Italian and 19 German, including losses on the ground and those shot down by their own side. Royal Navy gunners and FAA fighters claimed 74 aircraft shot down, against post-war data that they destroyed 42 Axis aircraft, 26 from the Regia Aeronautica and 16 Luftwaffe aircraft.

The FAA lost 13 aircraft on operations and 16 Sea Hurricanes when Eagle was sunk, the RAF lost a Beaufighter, five Spitfires and a Sunderland was shot down by Giada. The Allies could not risk such losses again and another large convoy to Malta was not attempted until November 1942, when the re-capture of airfields in Egypt and Libya after the Second Battle of El Alamein made it much easier to provide land-based air cover. (Note: In 1956, the official history gave FAA losses of 13 aircraft in action and 16 when Eagle was sunk, the RAF lost five aircraft and 35 Axis aircraft were shot down, including losses over Malta. In 1957, Giuseppe Santoro wrote that the Regia Aeronautica lost 24 aircraft (excluding those destroyed in British raids on Sardinian airfields and the radio-controlled SM 79 bomber) and that the Germans lost 24 aircraft, plus an unknown number of reconnaissance aircraft operating against the convoy.)

=== Subsequent operations ===
From 16 to 18 August, HMS Furious made another Club Run from Gibraltar and dispatched 29 Spitfires to Malta in Operation Baritone. In September and October, Malta was supplied by the submarines (Otus, Rorqual on the Magic Carpet run and Clyde sailed during the operation with ammunition, aviation fuel and torpedoes). The submarines Parthian, Clyde, Traveller and Thrasher made more Magic Carpet runs and the fast minelayer Welshman made a dash from Gibraltar with 300 long tons (300 t) of food. In September, with Malta revictualled, Allied forces sank 100,000 long tons (100,000 t) of Axis shipping, including 24,000 long tons (24,000 t) of fuel destined for Rommel, leaving the Axis forces in Egypt consuming supplies faster than receipts, contributing to tactical paralysis during the Second Battle of El Alamein (23 October – 11 November) and Operation Torch (8–16 November).

Submarines and Beaufort torpedo-bombers, escorted by Beaufighters, regularly attacked Axis supply ships, concentrating on tankers, known to the Allies through Ultra intercepts. An attempt to run a disguised merchant ship to Malta early in November failed and then Operation Stoneage (17–21 November), a convoy of four merchant ships from Alexandria, arrived undamaged (the light cruiser Arethusa was torpedoed with 155 men killed and had to be towed back to port). Force K was re-established at Malta and in Operation Portcullis (1–5 December), five ships were dispatched and arrived safely. Chariot manned torpedoes began to operate from Malta that month and from late December to January 1943, four convoys, Quadrangle A, B, C and D, with pairs of merchantmen in each, delivered 200,000 long tons (200,000 t) of stores without loss; empty ships were retrieved from the island.

== Commemoration ==
In recognition of their fortitude during the siege and air attacks during all of the Mediterranean campaign, Malta had been awarded the George Cross in the months immediately preceding this operation. Syfret was appointed a Knight Commander of the Order of the Bath for his "bravery and dauntless resolution in fighting an important convoy through to Malta in the face of relentless attacks by day and night from enemy submarines, aircraft, and surface forces". Rear-Admiral Lyster, who commanded the air operations, was appointed a Commander of the Order of the British Empire. The Master of the tanker Ohio, Dudley Mason, was awarded the George Cross for showing "skill and courage of the highest order and it was due to his determination that, in spite of the most persistent enemy opposition, the vessel, with her valuable cargo, eventually reached Malta and was safely berthed". Several other men of the Royal Navy and the Merchant Navy, including the commander of Ledbury, Roger Hill, received military awards ranging from the Distinguished Service Order and Conspicuous Gallantry Medal to Mentioned in Despatches, for the bravery shown in ferrying the merchantmen to Malta. The United States' Merchant Marine Distinguished Service Medal was awarded to Junior Third Officer Frederick August Larsen, Jr. and to Cadet-Midshipman, US Merchant Marine Academy, Francis A. Dales for "Heroism beyond the call of duty" for their conduct aboard the Santa Elisa and Ohio. Operation Pedestal was the subject of a 1953 black and white British film, Malta Story, that interspersed archive footage of Ohio with scripted studio scenes.

== See also ==
- Operation Pedestal orders of battle
- Bonner Fellers

== Bibliography ==
=== Books ===
- Blair, Clay (1996). Hitler's U-Boat War: The Hunters 1939–1942. Random House. ISBN 978-0-394-58839-1.
- Giorgerini, Giorgio (2002). Uomini sul fondo: storia del sommergibilismo italiano dalle origini a oggi [Men on the Bottom: The Story of the Italian Submarine from Past to Present] (in Italian). Milano: Mondadori. ISBN 978-88-04-50537-2.
- Greene, Jack; Massignani, Alessandro (1998). The Naval War in the Mediterranean, 1940–1943. Rochester: Chatham. ISBN 978-1-86176-057-9.
- Greene, J.; Massignani, A. (2002) [1998]. The Naval War in the Mediterranean 1940–1943 (pbk. ed.). Rochester: Chatham. ISBN 978-1-86176-190-3.
- Hague, A. (2000). The Allied Convoy System 1939–1945: Its Organization, Defence and Operation. London: Chatham. ISBN 1-86176-147-3.
- H. M. Ships Damaged or Sunk by Enemy Action, 3rd September, 1939 to 2nd September, 1945 (PDF). London: HMSO. 1952. OCLC 38570200. Archived from the original (PDF) on 10 June 2016.
- Halliwell, L.; Walker, J. (2001). Halliwell's Film & Video Guide 2002 (pbk. rev. 17th ed.). London: HarperCollinsEntertainment. ISBN 978-0-00-712265-3.
- Hooton, E. R. (2010) [1997]. Eagle in Flames: Defeat of the Luftwaffe. London: Weidenfeld & Nicolson. ISBN 978-1-85409-343-1.
- Latimer, Jon (2003) [2002]. Alamein. Cambridge, MS: Harvard University Press. ISBN 978-0-674-01016-1.
- Malcolm, Ian (2013). Shipping Company Losses of the Second World War. Stroud: The History Press. ISBN 978-0-7509-5371-9.
- Martienssen, A. K. (1949). Hitler and his Admirals. New York: E. P. Dutton. OCLC 562130.
- Playfair, Major-General I. S. O.; Flynn, Captain F. C. RN; Molony, Brigadier C. J. C.; Gleave, Group Captain T. P. (2004) [1960]. Butler, Sir James (ed.). The Mediterranean and Middle East: British Fortunes Reach Their Lowest Ebb (September 1941 to September 1942). History of the Second World War, United Kingdom Military Series. Vol. III (pbk. facs, repr Naval & Military Press, Uckfield ed.). London: HMSO. ISBN 978-1-84574-067-2.
- Richards, D.; Saunders, H. St G. (1975) [1954]. Royal Air Force 1939–45: Volume II The Fight Avails (repr. ed.). London: HMSO. ISBN 978-0-11-771593-6. Archived from the original on 1 January 2019 – via Hyperwar Foundation.
- Roskill, S. W. (1957) [1954]. Butler, J. R. M. (ed.). The Defensive. History of the Second World War United Kingdom Military Series: The War at Sea 1939–1945. Vol. I (4th impr. ed.). London: HMSO. OCLC 881709135. Archived from the original on 27 February 2022 – via Hyperwar Foundation.
- Roskill, S. W. (1956). The Period of Balance. History of the Second World War United Kingdom Military Series: The War at Sea 1939–1945. Vol. II. London: HMSO. OCLC 174453986. Archived from the original on 6 March 2014 – via Hyperwar Foundation.
- Sadkovich, James (1994). The Italian Navy in World War II. Westport, CN: Greenwood Press. ISBN 978-0-313-28797-8.
- Santoro, G. (1957). L'aeronautica italiana nella seconda guerra mondiale [The Italian Air Force in WWII] (PDF). Vol. II (1st ed.). Milano-Roma: Edizione Esse. OCLC 60102091. Archived from the original on 19 January 2016.
- Shankland, Peter; Hunter, Anthony (1961). Malta Convoy. New York, NY: Ives Washburn. OCLC 497743.
- Smith, Peter C. (1985). Pedestal: The Malta convoy of August 1942. London: William Kimber. ISBN 978-0-71-830632-8.
- Smith, Peter C. (1987). Pedestal: The Malta convoy of August 1942 (2nd rev. exp. ed.). London: William Kimber. ISBN 0-7183-0632-5.
- Smith, Peter C. (1998). Pedestal: The Convoy That Saved Malta. Manchester: Crécy Books. ISBN 978-0-947554-77-4.
- Smith, Peter (2009) [1995]. Eagle's War: Aircraft Carrier HMS Eagle 1939–1942. Manchester: Crécy Books. ISBN 978-0-90-757953-3.
- The Rise and Fall of the German Air Force (Public Record Office War Histories ed.). Richmond, Surrey: Air Ministry. 2001 [1948]. ISBN 978-1-903365-30-4. Air 41/10.
- Wellum, G. (2003) [2002]. First Light (Penguin ed.). London: Viking. ISBN 978-0-14-100814-1.
- Woodman, Richard (2003). Malta Convoys, 1940–1943. John Murray. ISBN 978-0-7195-6408-6.

=== Journals ===
- Vego, M. (Winter 2010). "Major Convoy Operation To Malta, 10–15 August 1942 (Operation Pedestal)" (PDF). Naval War College Review. 63 (1). ISSN 0028-1484. Archived (PDF) from the original on 21 September 2021.

=== Reports ===
- "Official Despatch on Mediterranean Convoy Operations Admiral Sir Andrew Cunningham,19 March 1941". The London Gazette (Supplement). No. 38377. 10 August 1948. pp. 4501–4512.

=== Newspaper articles ===
- Carabott, Sarah (15 August 2022). "Looting of a convoy that stands testimony to the starvation of a nation". Times of Malta. Archived from the original on 15 August 2022.

=== Websites ===
- "Operation Pedestal and SS Ohio Save Malta". American Merchant Marine at War. Archived from the original on 13 June 2007.
