= SS Ohio =

American oil tanker; used by the UK to resupply Malta during WWII

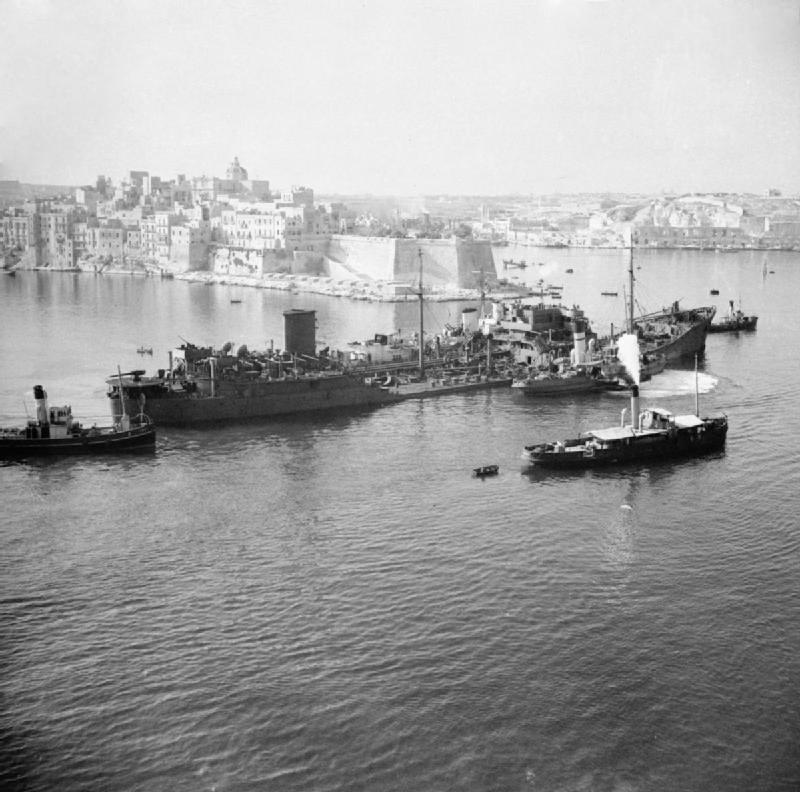
- Ohio entering Grand Harbour in Malta lashed between two destroyers and a tugboat

History
- Name: Ohio
- Owner: Texas Oil Company (1940–42); MoWT (1942–44)
- Operator: Eagle Oil & Shipping (1942–44)
- Port of registry: (United States) Wilmington (1940–42); (United Kingdom) London (1942–44)
- Builder: Sun Shipbuilding & Drydock Co.
- Yard number: 190
- Laid down: 7 September 1939
- Launched: 20 April 1940
- Completed: June 1940
- Acquired: Transferred to MoWT 10 July 1942
- Decommissioned: 15 August 1945
- Identification: Call sign WEKV (1940–42); Call sign BDYQ (1942–44); Official number 168296 (1942–44)
- Nickname(s): "OH 10"
- Fate: Sunk by naval gunfire practice 19 September 1946

General characteristics
- Class & type: SS Ohio
- Tonnage: 1940–42: 9,625 GRT, 5,405 NRT; 1942–45: 9,514 GRT, 5,436 NRT
- Length: 515 ft (157 m) o/a; 495.0 ft (150.9 m) p/p
- Beam: 68.3 ft (20.8 m)
- Depth: 36.2 ft (11.0 m)
- Propulsion: 2 × steam turbines; double reduction gearing; 1 × screw propeller
- Speed: 16 kn (30 km/h); (sea trials 19 kn (35 km/h))
- Capacity: 170,000 barrels (27,000 m^{3}) of oil
- Complement: 77 men (24 DEMS gunners)
- Sensors & processing systems: wireless direction finding; echo sounding device; gyrocompass
- Armament: 1 × 5-inch low-angle gun (aft); 1 × 3-inch anti-aircraft gun (bows); 1 × Bofors 40 mm L/60 gun abaft the funnel; 6 × Oerlikon 20 mm cannon

SS Ohio was an oil tanker built for The Texas Company (later Texaco). The ship was launched on 20 April 1940 at the Sun Shipbuilding & Drydock Co. in Chester, Pennsylvania. The United Kingdom requisitioned it to re-supply the island fortress of Malta during the Second World War.

The tanker played a key role in Operation Pedestal, which was one of the fiercest and most heavily contested of the Malta convoys, in August 1942. Although Ohio reached Malta successfully, it was so badly damaged that it had to be effectively scuttled in order to offload its cargo, and never sailed again. The tanker is fondly remembered in Malta, where to this day it is considered the saviour of the beleaguered island.

== Design and building ==
Sun Shipbuilding & Drydock Co. built Ohio as hull 190, launching her on 20 April 1940 and completing her that June. She was a skillful compromise, promising broad cargo-carrying capacity to the merchant and speed, balance, and stability to the mariner. Above the waterline her design echoed the outward curve of a schooner's bow, bearing the influence of the old American clipper ship design. She was the lead ship of her class of eight ships, all owned by The Texas Company.

The threat of a rearming Germany and a Japanese Empire bent on military expansion, and the approach of war, influenced Ohio's design. Unofficial conversations between military and oil chiefs resulted in a ship of 9,265 gross register tons (GRT) and 5,405 NRT, 515 feet length overall, and capable of carrying 170,000 barrels (27,000 m^{3}) of fuel oil. The ship was completed in the unusually short time of seven months and 15 days.

The Westinghouse steam turbine engines developed 9,000 driveshaft horsepower at 90 revolutions per minute, which gave her a speed of 16 knots (30 km/h). Ohio was considered the fastest tanker of her era. Her method of construction was controversial. For some years, the issue of welding versus riveting had raged on both sides of the Atlantic. Ohio was welded, with hopes it would prove once and for all its reliability. The ship also had a composite framing system with two longitudinally continuous bulkheads, which divided the ship into 21 cargo tanks.

The ship was launched the day after that scheduled, prompting superstitious fear in the welders, steel-cutters and other craftsmen who had assembled to watch her launch. She was christened in a ceremony presided over by the mother of William Starling Sullivant Rodgers, president of the Texas Oil Company, Florence E. Rodgers, who, grasping the ceremonial bottle of champagne in her hand, pronounced the words:

I name this good ship Ohio. May God go with her and all who sail in her. Good luck…

The ship slid down No. 2 slipway, entering the waters of the Delaware River. The existence of Ohio would, in her initial years, be uneventful and ordinary, plying between Port Arthur and various other American harbors. She set a speed record from Bayonne to Port Arthur, covering 1,882 miles (3,029 km) in four days and twelve hours, an average of more than seventeen knots.

== Malta, "Pedestal" planning and Ohio ==
In 1942, Britain was waging war in the Mediterranean against the German Afrika Korps and Italian forces in North Africa. Crucial to this theatre of operations was the island of Malta, sitting in the middle of Axis supply lines and, if supplied with sufficient munitions, aircraft and fuel, capable of causing severe shortages to the German and Italian armies in North Africa. Munitions and aircraft were available – during a brief lull in the Axis attacks, for example, the island's defenses were reinforced by 38 Spitfire Mk V aircraft flown in from HMS Furious – but these, along with food and fuel, remained in critically short supply. Successive attempts at resupplying the island had mostly failed; the convoys "Harpoon" (from Gibraltar) and "Vigorous" (from Alexandria, Egypt) saw most of their merchantmen sunk and escort ships damaged by aerial and surface attacks. One of the ships lost during "Harpoon" was Ohio's sister ship Kentucky, crippled by a German air attack and then abandoned. The tanker was eventually finished off by the Italian cruisers Raimondo Montecuccoli and Eugenio di Savoia and two destroyers.

On 18 June, after the failures of "Harpoon" and "Vigorous", the Commander in Chief of the Mediterranean Fleet cabled UK Prime Minister Winston Churchill to express his doubts about attempting another convoy. Three days later Ohio steamed into the mouth of the Clyde, under the command of Sverre Petersen, a former Master in Sail from Oslo, in Norway. In early May 1942, a radio message had reached Captain Petersen which diverted the ship to Galveston in Texas, and then ordered the tanker to proceed to Britain. Before leaving, Ohio was defensively armed with one 5-inch (130 mm) gun on her stern and one 3-inch (76 mm) anti-aircraft gun in the bow. She then moved to Sinclair Terminal, Houston in Texas, where she loaded a full cargo of 103,576 barrels (16,467.3 m^{3}) of petrol (gasoline), and sailed on 25 May. Ohio discharged her cargo at Bowling-on-the-Clyde, then steamed out into the tideway and anchored, awaiting orders.

Here the captain received a letter from Lord Leathers, the head of the British Ministry of War Transport, bidding the master a personal welcome and "...your safe arrival in the Clyde with the first cargo of oil carried in a United States tanker." However, the euphoria that such a message brought to the crew soon turned into resentment and anger. A telegram was received the same day by the head office of Texaco, from the War Shipping Administration, announcing simply that Ohio was being requisitioned "pursuant to the law". The immediate reaction was a cabled message from Mr TE Buchanan, General Manager of Texaco's Marine Department to the firm's London agent, that on no account was Ohio to leave her discharging port of Bowling-on-the-Clyde.

A period of indecision, meetings and debates between the highest US authorities and their British counterparts soon ensued. The master was told that further orders would arrive soon afterwards. The decision was finally taken two weeks later, when a launch sped out to the ship anchored in the Clyde and Texaco's London agent, accompanied by an official of the UK Ministry of War Transport came aboard. They met the Captain, who was told that the ship was to be requisitioned and handed over to a UK crew. The US crew and the captain were exasperated by the seemingly outrageous order, but had no other option but to give in, and started to pack their kit whilst UK seamen began to take the ship over.

On 10 July, Captain Petersen handed over the ship. There was no formal ceremony and little goodwill. The US flag was taken down, and Ohio henceforward sailed under the Red Ensign. Overnight she was transferred from US to UK registry. On 25 July the MoWT contracted her management to the Eagle Oil and Shipping Company, which was warned of the importance of the impending convoy and that "...much might depend on the quality and courage of the crew." At about the time Ohio was transferred to the UK registry, her tonnages were revised to 9,514 GRT and 5,436 NRT.

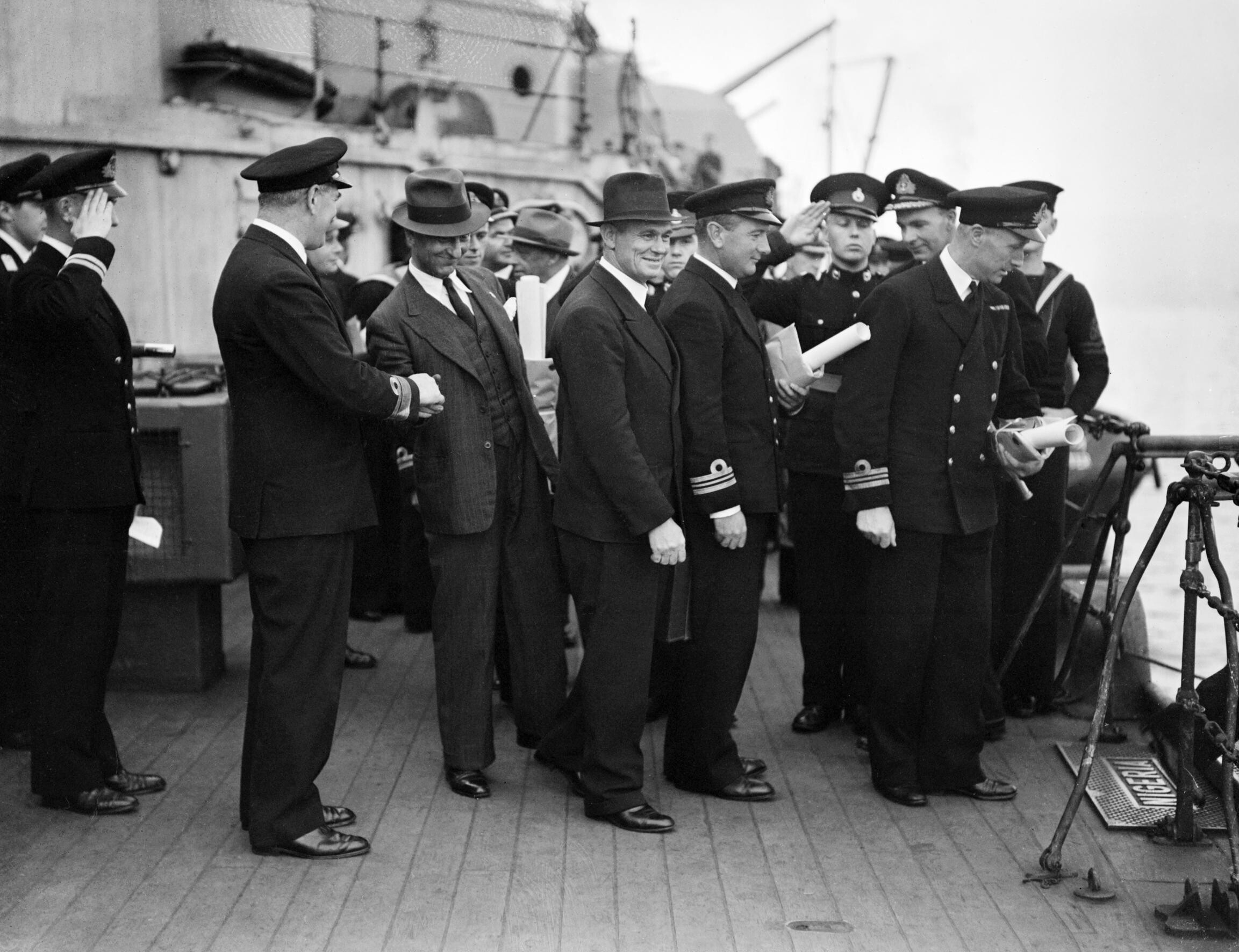
Rear-Admiral H M Burrough, CB, who commanded the close escort, shaking hands with Captain Dudley Mason

As the UK crew started to assemble, it became clear that a large convoy was being planned. Command of the ship passed to Captain Dudley W Mason, who at 39 had already held other commands. James Wyld was to be chief engineer. 48 hours after Ohio had been transferred to British registry, her crew was completed. The ship's company numbered 77, including 24 Royal Navy and Royal Artillery Marine Regiment DEMS gunners. The ship was then moved to King George V Dock, Glasgow for improvements and additional armament. As she would be the only ship carrying kerosene and diesel fuel which were so vital to Malta's survival before she sailed she was given special strengthening to protect her against the shock of bombs exploding near her. In the previous convoy, the tanker Kentucky had been sunk with only a few hours' repair work needed on a steam pipe, which had been broken by the force of such explosions. The Ministry was determined that this should not happen again, and so Ohio's engines were mounted on rubber bearings, to reduce shock, and all steam pipes were supported with steel springs and baulks of timber. A system of pipes were connected to the ships compressors and a new diesel compressor so that air at 120 lb per square inch could pressurise any holed tank and blow seawater back out. The armament was improved with a 3-inch anti-aircraft gun on the bow, a 5-inch gun on the stern, two more Oerlikons, machine guns and a 40 mm Bofors behind the funnel to guard against stern attacks by aircraft.

=== Ohio and "Pedestal" ===
==== Departure ====
After the failure of the mid-June convoys, it was wondered if Malta could hold out on the meagre supplies rescued from "Harpoon" and "Vigorous" and small deliveries carried by submarine and by the fast minelayer HMS Welshman until another convoy could be organised. Escorting merchant ships in the brilliance of a Mediterranean moonlit period was courting disaster. This situation limited operations in the immediate future to the moonless period in July or August between the 10th and 16th of those months. July passed as Ohio could not be fitted out in time. Once the due planning had been carried out it was decided to begin the operation in August.

Ohio steamed down to Dunglass on the Clyde and loaded 11,500 tons of kerosene and diesel fuel oils.

While the merchant ships gathered in the Firth of Clyde, the naval forces had already reached Scapa Flow. Admiral Syfret joined the battleship HMS Nelson there on 27 July and held a convoy conference on 2 August. The same day, all leave had been stopped. At eight o'clock that evening, two hours before dusk, the convoy sailed. The 14 ships, of WS 21S led by HMS Nigeria with the cruiser Kenya and destroyers Bicester and Bramham formed up; it was dark by the time they reached the open sea.

The following day, WS21S was joined by Force F (two battleships and six destroyers) and then a further five destroyers. Further warships joined the convoy en route to Gibraltar. By the 8 August the convoy numbered 67 vessels.

==== Axis attacks and damage ====
The convoy left Gibraltar in thick fog on 9 August. A day later, four torpedoes from the German submarine U-73 struck the aircraft-carrier HMS Eagle which sank in four minutes, killing 260 men, and losing all but four planes. On the same day, German bombers attacked the convoy. On 12 August 20 Junkers Ju 88s attacked the convoy, while a further combined strike by 100 German and Italian Regia Aeronautica planes attacked the merchantmen.

In the ensuing mayhem the Italian submarine Axum torpedoed Ohio amidships. A huge pillar of flame leapt high into the air. Ohio was on fire and seemed to be out of control. Captain Mason ordered the engines to be shut down, with all deckhands available fighting the fire with the deck waterlines. Burning kerosene bubbled up from the fractured tanks, while small gouts of flame spattered the deck up to 30 yards from the blaze. The flames were put out and the tanker managed 13 knots (24 km/h) after being repaired. The blast destroyed the ship's gyrocompass and knocked the magnetic compass off its bearings, while the steering gear was put out of action, forcing the crew to steer with the emergency gear aft.

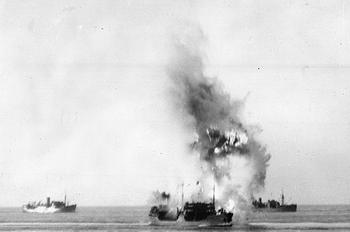
A torpedo from the Italian submarine Axum strikes Ohio on her port side

The torpedo had blown a hole, 24 by 27 ft (7 by 8 m), in the port side of the midships pump-room. It had also blown a hole in the starboard side, flooding the compartment. There were jagged tears in the bulkheads and kerosene was spurting up from adjoining tanks, seeping in a film up through the holes in the hull. The deck had been broken open, so that one could look down into the ship. From beam to beam the deck was buckled, but the ship held together.

Another 60 Junkers Ju 87 Stuka dive bombers attacked the convoy, focusing on Ohio. A series of near misses ensued as the tanker approached the island of Pantelleria. Bombs threw spray over the decks of the tanker, while aircraft used their machine guns. One near-miss buckled the ship's plates and the forward tank filled with water. The 3-inch (76 mm) gun at the bows was twisted in its mountings and put out of action. A formation of five Ju 88s was broken up by the tanker's anti aircraft guns, with the bombs falling harmlessly in the sea.

One of Ohio's gunners shot down a Ju 87, but the aircraft crashed into the ship's starboard side, forward of the upper bridge, and exploded. Half a wing hit the upper work of the bridge and a rain of debris showered the tanker from stem to stern. The plane's bomb failed to detonate. Captain Mason was telephoned from aft by the chief officer, who told Mason that the Ju 87 had crashed into the sea and then bounced onto the ship. Mason 'rather curtly' replied: "Oh that's nothing. We've had a Junkers 88 on the foredeck for nearly half an hour."

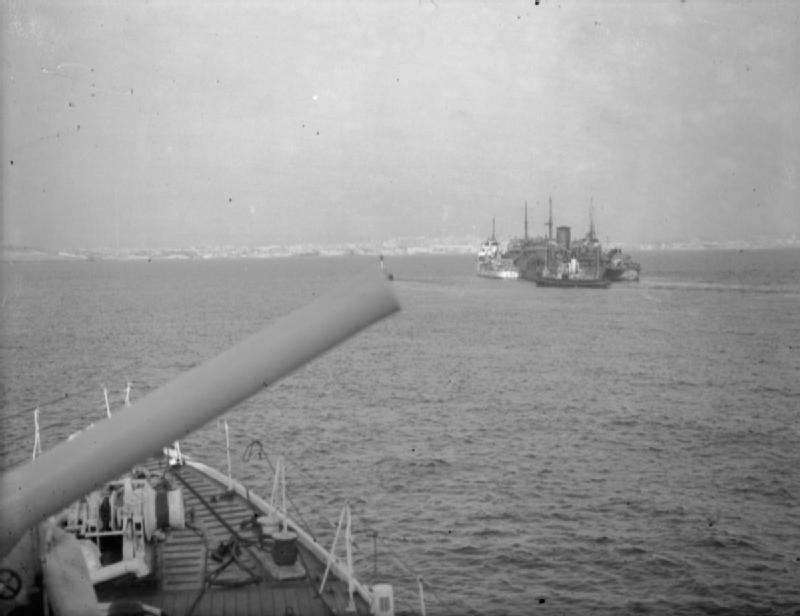
Ohio escorted by a flotilla of destroyers and minesweepers

As the ship turned slowly to comb torpedoes, two sticks of bombs fell, one on either side of the tanker. The vessel was lifted clean out of the water. Cascades of spray and bomb splinters lashed the deck, she fell back with a crash. Ohio had differential gearing which slowed the propeller automatically; on other ships, the same effect would have shaken the engines out of their rooms.

Continuously bombed, the tanker kept on steaming until another explosion to starboard sent her reeling to port. The engine-room lights went out because the master switches had been thrown off by the force of the explosion. An electrician quickly switched them on again. The boiler fires had been blown out, and it was a race against time to restore them before the steam pressure dropped too low to work the fuel pumps. The engineers lit the fire starter torches to restart the furnaces.

The complicated routine of restarting went forward smoothly and within 20 minutes Ohio was steaming at 16 knots again. Then another salvo of bombs hit the ship, shaking every plate, and once more the engines slowed and stopped. The concussion had broken her electric fuel pumps. While the crew tried to reconnect the electrical wires and restart the engines via the auxiliary steam system, the engine room was filled with black smoke until the engines were properly re-lit. The ship was making alternate black and white smoke and, with oil in the water pipes and a loss of vacuum in the condenser, Ohio started to lose way slowly, coming to a stop at 1050 hrs. The crew abandoned ship, boarding HMS Penn that had come to Ohio's aid with another destroyer, HMS Ledbury. Ledbury soon left the stricken tanker after being ordered to go in search of the cruiser HMS Manchester, which had been crippled by Italian motor torpedo boats.

==== Under tow ====
Penn's commanding officer, Commander JH Swain RN, offered Captain Mason a tow with a heavy 10-inch manila hemp rope. With the tow line in place Penn moved ahead, straining her engines to the limit. Ohio continued to list to port. The two ships were making no progress, and were even drifting astern with the easterly wind. Now both ships were sitting targets, and as another serious attack developed, the destroyer went to full speed to part the tow. A German bomber dived at the tanker and released its bomb just before it was shot down by Ohio's gunners. The bomb hit the tanker just where the initial torpedo had hit her, effectively breaking her keel just as night was setting in.

Ohio was abandoned for the night. The day after, Penn was joined by the minesweeper HMS Rye. The two ships towed the tanker and succeeded in making up to 5 knots (9.3 km/h), overcoming the tendency to swing to port. Another attack blasted the group of ships, breaking the tow lines and immobilising Ohio's rudder. Another bomb hit the fore end of her foredeck, forcing the engineers out of the engine room. Once more, Mason gave the order to abandon ship, as two more air attacks narrowly missed the tanker. A superficial examination showed that the rent that had developed in the amidships section had widened and that the ship had indeed almost certainly broken her back.

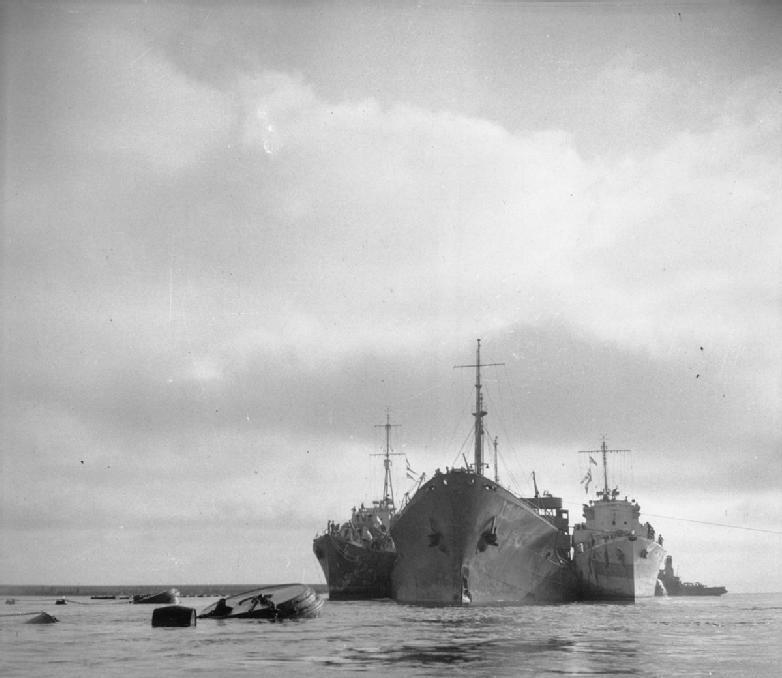
The damaged tanker, supported by Royal Navy destroyers HMS Penn (left) and Ledbury (right).

The two ships around the tanker were joined by HMS Bramham and by Ledbury which had returned from her search for Manchester. Meanwhile, Rye had again begun to tow Ohio with the newly arrived Ledbury acting as a stern tug. With less pull from Ledbury, a fair speed was maintained, but steering proved impossible. A stabilising factor was needed, thus Commander Swain edged Penn to the starboard side of Ohio. Rye, joined by Bramham, slowly got under way once more, with Ledbury acting as a rudder. Another enemy air attack began just as the group of ships was moving at 6 kn (11 km/h).

At 1045 hrs the first wave of dive-bombers came low over the water. Only one oil bomb landed close to Ohio's bow, showering her with burning liquid. Then came three more echelons of German planes. This time, close air support from Malta was available. 16 Spitfires, of 229 and 249 Squadrons from Malta, had sighted the enemy. The first enemy formation wavered and broke. The second formation also broke, but one section of Ju 88s succeeded in breaking free, making for the tanker. These were swiftly followed by Spitfires. Three of the German planes were shot down or manoeuvred to evade the Spitfires, but one bomber held its course and a 1,000-pound bomb landed in the tanker's wake. Ohio was flung forward, parting Rye's tow, buckling the stern plates of the tanker and forming a great hole.

==== Arrival ====
Ohio was sinking little more than 45 miles west of Malta. Under the protection of the Spitfires, the danger of enemy attacks receded. After the tow line was parted, Ledbury was still secured to Ohio by a heavy wire which had been pulled round by the heavily yawing tanker, and had ended up alongside Penn, facing the wrong way. After a quick analysis of the possibilities, it was decided to tow the tanker with a destroyer on either side of the tanker. Bramham was immediately ordered to make for port, while Penn remained coupled to the starboard side. The speed was increased but limited to 5 knots (9.3 km/h). Ohio's deck was awash amidships. Now under the protection of the coastal batteries of Malta, the group of ships were slowly moving around the island, approaching Grand Harbour. The coastal batteries fired on a creeping U-boat's conning tower, and drove off a group of E-boats.

Slowly the group approached the tricky harbour entrance, near Zonqor Point. Here the group dispersed before a British-laid minefield. At 0600 hrs on the festival of'Santa Marija (Assumption of Mary), with Ohio still hovering on the edge of the minefield, the situation was eased by the arrival of the Malta tugs. With destroyers still linked on either side of the tanker, the tugs made fast ahead and astern and the tanker was soon proceeding up the channel to the Grand Harbour entrance.

There, a great welcome awaited them. On the ramparts above the wreck-strewn harbour, on the Barracca, Fort Saint Angelo and Senglea, great crowds of Maltese men and women waved and cheered and a brass band on the end of the mole was giving a spirited rendition of Rule Britannia. Captain Mason, standing at the salute on the damaged bridge of the Ohio, had no time to reflect on the arrival at the harbor, as the creaking plates indicated the ship was still at risk of sinking in the Grand Harbour.

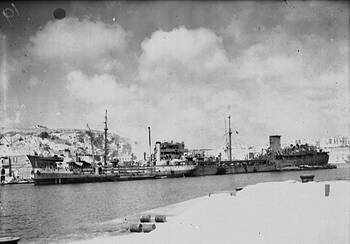
Ohio discharging her cargo in the Grand Harbour

Pipes were now hauled aboard and emergency salvage pumps began to discharge the kerosene. At the same time, a fleet auxiliary, RFA Boxol, began to pump the 10,000 tons of fuel oil into her own tanks. As the oil flowed out, Ohio sank lower and lower in the water. The last drops of oil left her and simultaneously her keel settled on the bottom. Her captain, Dudley William Mason, was subsequently awarded the George Cross.

==== Aftermath ====
After Ohio reached Malta, the ship broke in two from the damage she had sustained. There were insufficient shipyard facilities to repair the tanker, so the two halves were used for storage, and later barracks facilities for Yugoslavian troops.

On 19 September 1946 the forward half of Ohio was towed 10 miles (16 km) offshore and sunk by gunfire from the destroyer HMS Virago. On 3 October, the stern half was scuttled in deep water using explosive charges laid by the salvage vessel RFA Salventure.

== Epilogue ==
The final ship built for the Texaco fleet was Star Ohio, in honour of the famous Second World War tanker. She is operated by Northern Marine Management on behalf of Chevron.

The nameplate, ships wheel, ensign and several other objects of Ohio are preserved in Malta's National War Museum in Valletta.

The arrival of Ohio at the Grand Harbour provided the climax of the 1953 British war film Malta Story directed by Brian Desmond Hurst, starring Alec Guinness and Jack Hawkins.

== See also ==
- MV San Demetrio

== Fates of ships in class ==
- SS Ohio, Yard Number 190, Torpedoed and bombed off Malta 1942, scuttled 1946.
- SS Oklahoma, Yard Number 198, Torpedoed 1942, refloated, lost in North Atlantic 1945.
- SS Kentucky, Yard Number 223, To Britain 1942, bombed and scuttled off Malta 1942.
- SS Colorado, Yard Number 224, Survived war, scrapped 1970.
- SS Montana, Yard Number 225, Survived war, scrapped 1965.
- SS Georgia, Yard Number 324, Survived war, scrapped 1965.
- SS Delaware, Yard Number 325, Survived war, scrapped 1970.
- SS Indiana, Yard Number 326, Survived War, scrapped 1964.
