= HMS Penn =

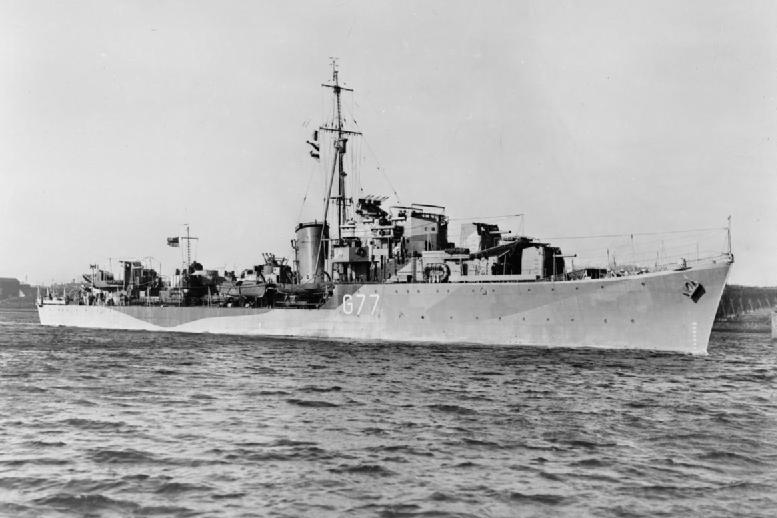
- HMS Penn underway in coastal waters.

History

United Kingdom
- Name: HMS Penn
- Ordered: 20 October 1939
- Builder: Vickers-Armstrongs, High Walker
- Laid down: 26 December 1939
- Launched: 12 February 1941
- Commissioned: 10 February 1942
- Identification: Pennant number: G77
- Fate: Sold for scrap 30 October 1950.

General characteristics
- Class & type: P-class destroyer
- Displacement: 1,640 long tons (1,666 t) standard; 2,250 long tons (2,286 t) full
- Length: 345 ft (105 m) o/a
- Beam: 35 ft (11 m)
- Draught: 12 ft 3 in (3.73 m)
- Installed power: 40,000 shp (30,000 kW); 2 × Admiralty 3-drum boilers
- Propulsion: 2 shafts; 2 × steam turbines
- Speed: 36 knots (67 km/h; 41 mph)
- Range: 3,850 nautical miles (7,130 km; 4,430 mi) at 20 knots (37 km/h; 23 mph)
- Complement: 176
- Armament: 4 × single QF 4 in Mk.V (102 mm); 1 × quadruple QF 2 pdr Mk.VIII (40 mm); 4 × single QF 20 mm Oerlikon; 2 × quadruple mounts for 21-inch (533 mm) torpedoes; 4 × throwers and 2 × racks for 70 depth charges

HMS Penn was a P-class destroyer built for the Royal Navy during the Second World War.

== Description ==
The P-class destroyers were repeats of the preceding O class, except that they were armed with 4-inch (102 mm) anti-aircraft guns. They displaced 1,640 long tons (1,670 t) at standard load and 2,250 long tons (2,290 t) at deep load. The ships had an overall length of 345 feet (105.2 m), a beam of 35 feet (10.7 m) and a deep draught of 12 feet 3 inches (3.7 m). They were powered by two Parsons geared steam turbines, each driving one propeller shaft, using steam provided by two Admiralty three-drum boilers. The turbines developed a total of 40,000 shaft horsepower (30,000 kW) and gave a maximum speed of 36 knots (67 km/h; 41 mph). The ships carried a maximum of 500 long tons (510 t) of fuel oil that gave them a range of 3,850 nautical miles (7,130 km; 4,430 mi) at 20 knots (37 km/h; 23 mph). The ships' complement was 176 officers and men.

Penn was armed with four QF 4-inch Mark V guns in single mounts, two pairs [superfiring] fore and aft. Her light anti-aircraft suite was composed of one quadruple mount for 2-pounder "pom-pom" guns and four single Oerlikon 20 mm cannon. The ship was fitted with two above-water quadruple mount for 21-inch (533 mm) torpedoes. The ship was fitted with four depth charge throwers and two racks for 70 depth charges.

== Construction and career ==
Penn was ordered under the Wartime Emergency Programme and was laid down at the High Walker yard of Vickers-Armstrongs on 26 December 1939. Penn was launched on 12 February 1941. She was commissioned into the fleet on 10 February 1942. In that year she was adopted by the borough of Camberwell in London as part of Warship Week.

Penn was involved in Operation Pedestal, a convoy to bring much needed reinforcements to Malta. Captained by Acting Commander James Hamilton Swain, during the course of this operation, Penn helped bring the damaged SS Ohio with her vital supplies of fuel into Grand Harbour, Valletta. Commander Swain was mentioned in dispatches and was also awarded the Distinguished Service Order (DSO) for the part he played in Operation Pedestal.

On 16/17 October 1943 Penn with the destroyer Jervis sank the German submarine chaser UJ-2109 at Kalymnos. On 7 November 1943 Penn with sister ship Pathfinder sank the German submarine trap GA45 off Amorgos, Greece.

On 15 June 1945, Penn with the destroyer Paladin, sank a Japanese landing craft off the Northwest coast of Sumatra.

In November 1945 Penn was in the East Indies, being used as an Air Target Ship. In February 1947 she was still part of the British Pacific Fleet and was attached to the 4th Submarine Flotilla. At the end of the year she returned to the UK and reduced to reserve at Harwich.

In April 1949 she was used for ship target trials and damage control trials. She was sold for scrap on 30 October 1950 and broken up at Troon.
