= USS Robinson (DD-562) =

Fletcher-class destroyer

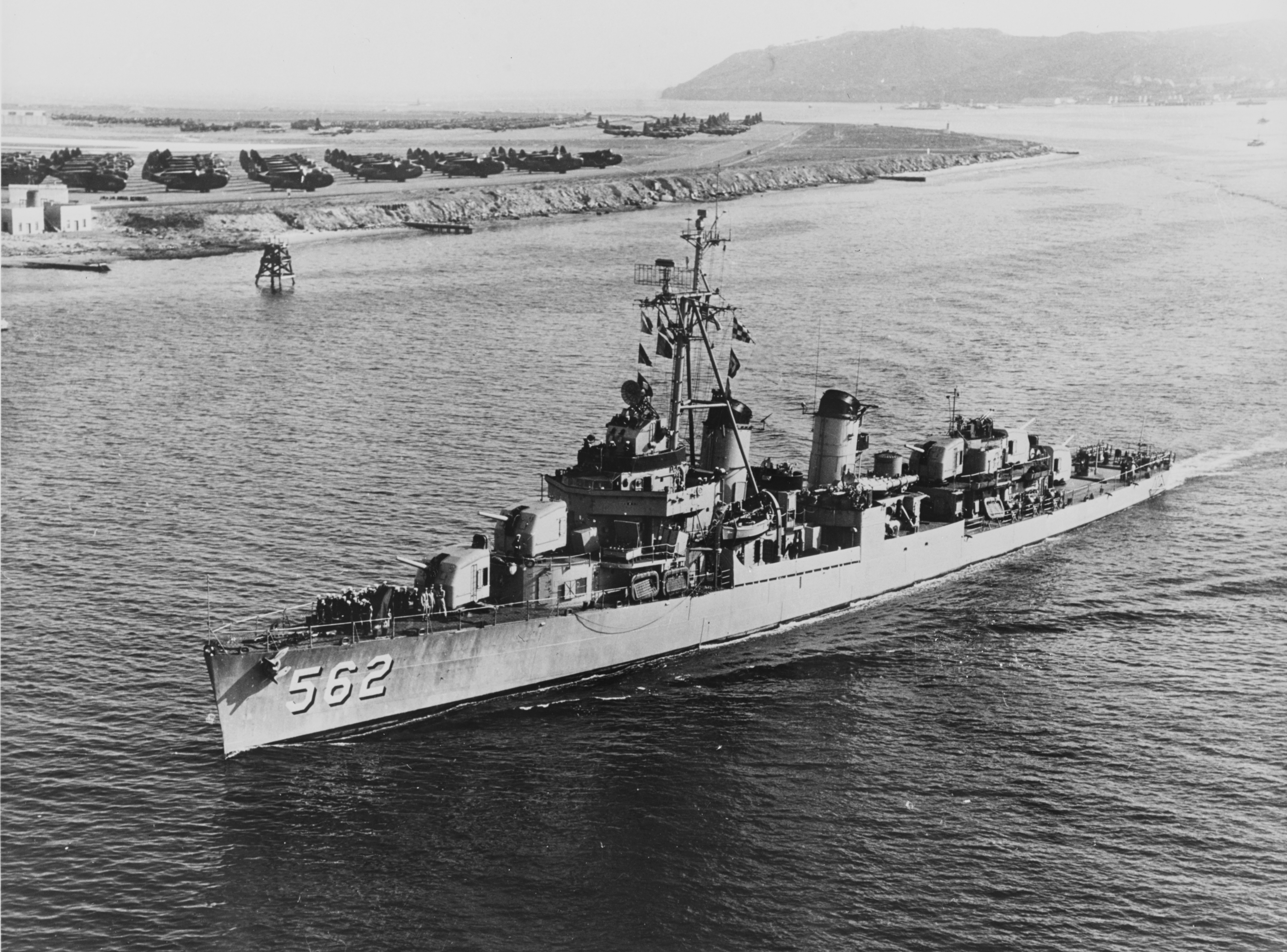
- USS Robinson (DD-562) steaming into San Diego harbor in 1953USS Robinson (DD-562) in 1953

History

United States
- Namesake: Isaiah Robinson
- Builder: Seattle-Tacoma Shipbuilding Corporation
- Laid down: 12 August 1942
- Launched: 28 August 1943
- Commissioned: 31 January 1944
- Decommissioned: 1 April 1964
- Stricken: 1 December 1974
- Fate: Sunk as target, 13 April 1982
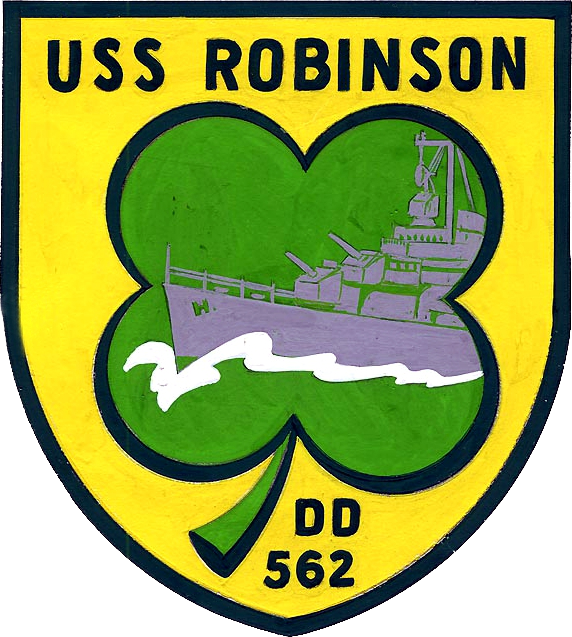
- Badge

General characteristics
- Class & type: Fletcher-class destroyer
- Displacement: 2,050 tons
- Length: 376 ft 6 in (114.7 m)
- Beam: 39 ft 8 in (12.1 m)
- Draft: 17 ft 9 in (5.4 m)
- Propulsion: 60,000 shp (45 MW); 2 propellers
- Speed: 35 knots (65 km/h; 40 mph)
- Range: 6500 nmi. (12,000 km) @ 15 kt
- Complement: 273
- Armament: 5 × 5 in (130 mm), 4 × 40 mm AA guns, 4 × 20 mm AA guns, 10 × 21 inch (533 mm) torpedo tubes, 6 × depth charge projectors, 2 × depth charge tracks

USS Robinson (DD-562), a Fletcher-class destroyer, was the second ship of the United States Navy to be named for Captain Isaiah Robinson (died c. 1781), who served in the Continental Navy.

== Operational history ==
Robinson was laid down on 12 August 1942 by the Seattle-Tacoma Shipbuilding Corp., Seattle, Wash.; launched 28 August 1943, sponsored by Mrs. Howard M. Sayers; and commissioned 31 January 1944.

After shakedown out of San Diego, Robinson, departed Seattle 12 April for Hawaii. Arriving at Pearl Harbor 21 April, she trained until getting underway on 29 May with Task Force 52 (TF 52), headed for Eniwetok and the Marianas.

=== World War II ===
==== Marianas campaign ====
On the morning of 15 June, Robinson opened fire in the battle of Saipan and her first salvo set off a large explosion, followed by an oil fire. She then silenced four enemy batteries which had been firing on Marines on the southernmost landing beaches, "Beach Yellow One". She then scored a direct hit on an enemy pillbox on Tinian. The destroyer joined the screen of battleship Tennessee (BB-43), at nightfall and in 2 hours fought off five enemy aircraft. She then teamed with destroyers Selfridge (DD-357) and Albert W. Grant (DD-649) in the screen of cruiser Birmingham (CL-62) off the western coast of Tinian, delivering harassing fire throughout the night.

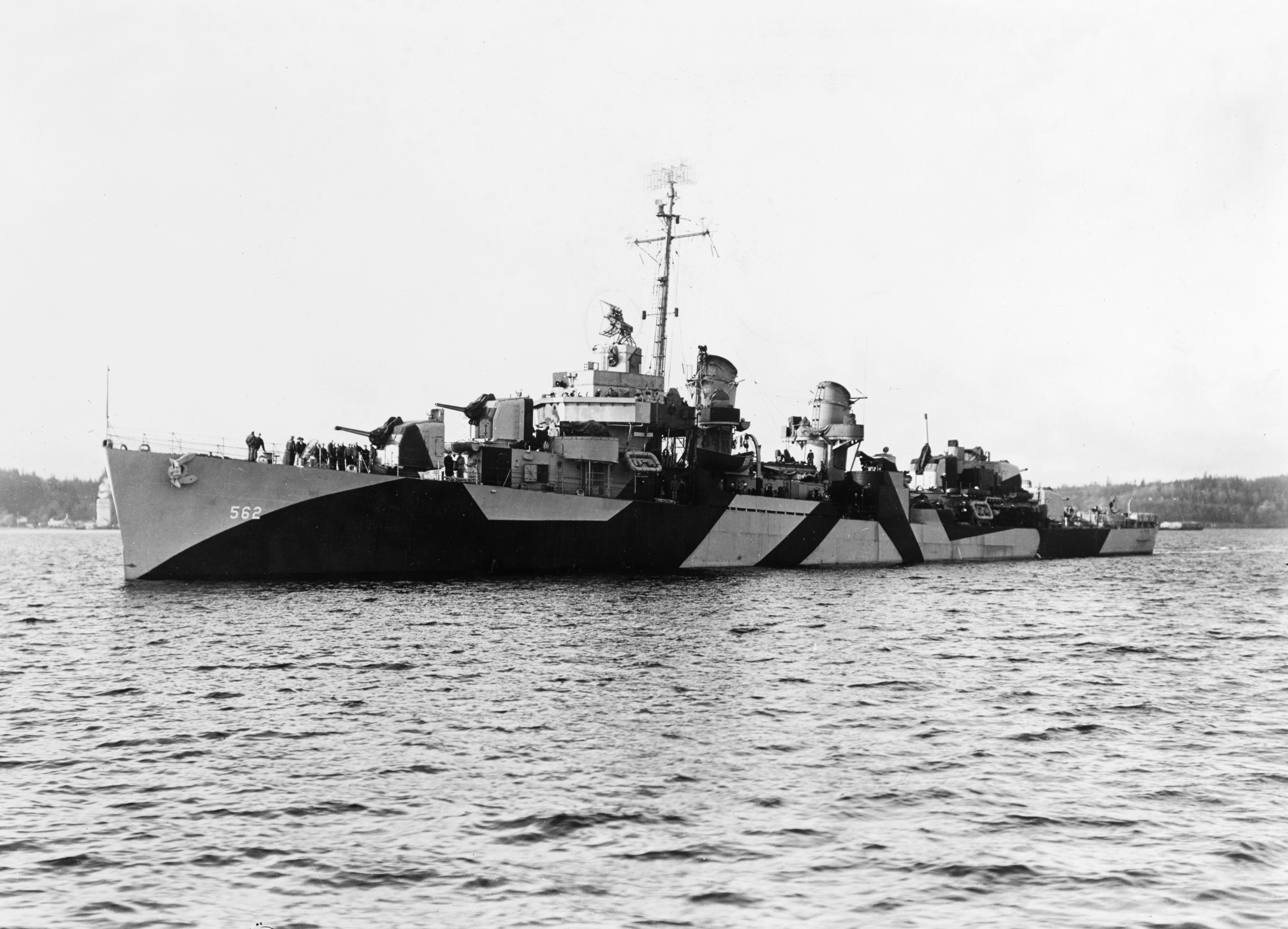
Robinson off the Puget Sound Navy Yard, 8 April 1944. She is wearing Camouflage Measure 32, Design 13D.

At daybreak 16 June, Robinson resumed fire support to the Marines on the southernmost invasion beaches of Saipan. During the morning, she silenced all but one stubborn gun of an enemy artillery emplacement and her fire assisted in turning back enemy tanks. Toward noon, she began safeguarding the transports off Saipan. At nightfall, she turned to call-fire duty off "Beach Green One". Throughout the night of 16 June and into the morning of the 17th, Robinson illuminated and fired upon counterattacking Japanese tank divisions twice driving them back from the beachhead. That afternoon, she took fire support station, then spent the night and the next 5 days, protecting troop transports off Saipan.

Retiring to Eniwetok with empty transports 26 June, she returned to Saipan on 6 July in the escort screen of a reinforcement convoy.

Robinson took antisubmarine patrol station northwest of Saipan that day and closed the shore at night to provide illumination fire and send salvos into enemy troops east of Marpi Point. She shifted her fire to the west, to Tanapag Harbor the following morning and during the afternoon, rescued 17 Marines from a reef north of the harbor where they had been isolated by one of the biggest banzai attacks of the war.

Robinson served on antisubmarine patrol off Saipan, in the ocean area northwest of Maniagassa Island, until 20 July, then got underway with Overton (APD-23) to escort 11 LCTs which arrived off Guam the next morning. She resumed fire support off Saipan that evening. On 22 July Robinson shifted her fire to Tinian, hitting caves where the enemy had dug in. She bombarded the western shore of Tinian 25 and 26 July; and, after gunfire support on the 29th, she guarded the minesweepers in Asiga Bay.

Departing Tinian on 31 July, she escorted the hospital transport ship, Tryon (APH-1) to Eniwetok; then steamed independently to Nouméa, New Caledonia, where she arrived 9 August.

==== Peleliu ====
Robinson cleared Nouméa on 22 August and touched at Espiritu Santo, New Hebrides Islands, to rejoin other ships of her division, then arrived at Purvis Bay of Florida, Solomon Islands on the 26th. She stood out from Purvis Bay on 6 September, with Rear Admiral Jesse B. Oldendorf's bombardment group, and arrived off Peleliu Island, on the morning of the 12th for pre-invasion bombardment. During the Battle of Peleliu, Robinson wiped out enemy machine gun emplacements and tumbled snipers out of trees as she blasted enemy troop concentrations near "White" and "Orange" beaches. At various times, she assisted in screening cruisers Louisville (CA-28) and Portland (CA-33) and battleships Idaho (BB-42) and Mississippi (BB-41). She also raked the beach area during the daylight hours to cover underwater demolition teams, and she carried out call fire missions on enemy troops and gun batteries. On 22 September, she knocked out all guns in her area and disabled two groups of enemy tanks. She continued to hit emplacements, troop areas and supply dumps until the early morning of 24 September 1944 when she teamed with Heywood L. Edwards (DD-663) in destroying enemy barges attempting to land troops and supplies on the north shore. That evening she screened cruiser Louisville to Kossol Passage.

She spent the night of 26 September providing illumination and harassing fire on the north end of Angaur Island. She gave the same treatment to Ngesebus Island the next night and bombarded the beaches south of Ngesebus airfields during the day of the 28th. She spent the night of 28–29 September delivering night illumination fire on the northwest corner of Angaur and entered Seeadler Harbor, Manus, Admiralty Islands, 1 October.

==== Philippines campaign ====
Robinson cleared Seeadler Harbor on the 12th, and headed for the Philippine Islands. On 17 October 1944, she joined the Dinagat Attack Group. With light cruisers Denver (CL-58) and Columbia (CL-56), and three other destroyers, Robinson supported the Dinagat Attack Group and set course for Dinagat and the three smaller islands, Calicoan, Suluan, and Homonhon, which divided the two entrances to Leyte Gulf and were suspected of harboring enemy search radar. To put these enemy warning stations out of action, the attack group arrived off the islands at daybreak of 17 October. Cruiser Denver had the honor of firing the opening gun for the liberation of Leyte at 08:00 and Company D of the 6th Rangers was landed on Suluan Island some 20 minutes later—the first Americans to "return" to the Philippines. Robinson escorted the Ranger unit to Dinagat Island where they made an unopposed landing. She then covered minesweepers in Leyte Gulf until their retirement on the morning of 19 October. Her guns raked the invasion beaches ahead of the troops landing on Leyte, 20 October 1944, and she delivered illumination fire over the eastern shore of Leyte throughout the night. On 22 October, she rescued a downed American fighter pilot. On 24 October Robinson destroyed enemy installations on the slope of Catmon Hill, Leyte.

At 17:10 on 24 October, Robinson was relieved from fire support duties and joined a screen for five cruisers on the left flank of the northern entrance to Surigao Strait. The destroyers were divided into three attack sections (of which Robinson was in Destroyer Squadron 56) and severely mauled the attacking Japanese (see: Battle of Surigao Strait). By early morning 25 October, the enemy was limping off in retreat, having lost two battleships, two destroyers and a cruiser. Robinson made rendezvous with the destroyers of section 3 to the north of Hibuson Island after her torpedo attack, and vainly attempted to rescue the many Japanese survivors who refused all efforts to save them. At 07:58, 25 October, Robinson joined other destroyers and cruisers in anticipation of meeting enemy surface and air units retiring from the fierce action with the escort carriers off the east coast of Samar. She cruised east of Leyte until 29 October to cover shipping in and near Leyte Gulf. She assisted in fighting off enemy air raids and escorted the bomb-damaged Killen (DD-593) to her anchorage in San Pedro Bay on 1 November. She was temporarily detached from the task group on 4 November for picket duty in Surigao Strait and rejoined the bombardment group on 13 November as it set course for Manus. She teamed with Bryant (DD-665) to shoot down an enemy plane which approached the formation on the 16th, and entered Seeadler Harbor on the 21st.

Robinson stood out of Seeadler Harbor on 28 November for Leyte Gulf where on 1 December she was detached from Destroyer Division 112 (DesDiv 112) of Destroyer Squadron 56 (DesRon 56) and reported to Destroyer Squadron 22 for duty. The next day she got underway in the screen of battleships and cruisers for Kossol Passage, where she teamed with 14 other destroyers in the screen of six escort carriers, seven cruisers, and three battleships, acting as distant cover for troop convoys bound for the assault on Mindoro, Philippine Islands. She assisted in driving off enemy aircraft as she guarded the escort carriers from 13 to 15 December. The troops hit the beach at Mindoro on the 15th and Robinson returned to Seeadler Harbor with the task group on the 23d.

On 31 December Robinson and the five other destroyers of DesRon 22 sailed from Seeadler Harbor in the screen for Transport Group "Able" of the Lingayen Attack Force, carrying the 27th Infantry Division for the initial landings at Lingayen Gulf, Luzon, in the Philippines. Robinson screened northwest of the transport area on the morning of 9 January 1945 as the first waves of amphibious assault troops landed. She anchored in the transport area that night and survived a pre-dawn attack by a Japanese suicide boat. The underwater explosions temporarily put her sonar equipment out of commission but did no other serious damage. At daybreak, Robinson's gunners fought off a diving kamikaze suicide plane and knocked it down in a spinning ball of flame. At dusk she opened fire on another suicide plane diving at a highspeed transport. That enemy missed its target and crashed into the sea. Robinson returned to Leyte Gulf with the empty transports on the 15th.

She got underway from San Pedro Bay on 18 January to escort the attack transport Comet (APA-166) to Humboldt Bay, Hollandia, New Guinea, and returned on 3 February escorting Wright (AG-79). After installation of fighter-director radio equipment, she cleared port with Harmon (DE-678) and Greenwood (DE-679) in the screen for amphibious command ship Blue Ridge (AGC-2) and three transports; and headed for Lingayen Gulf where she performed patrol duty. She returned to San Pedro Bay with the empty troopship on 26 February, and sailed the next day with Bancroft (DD-598), escorting Rear Adm. Forrest B. Royal's amphibious command ship, Rocky Mount (AGC-3) which reached Mangarin Bay, Mindoro, on 1 March. That same day, Robinson put to sea in the screen for Task Group 78.1 (TG 78.1). The American ships arrived off the Zamboanga Peninsula of Mindanao early in the morning of 10 March, and Robinson took station off Coldera Point as troops stormed ashore under the cover of a rocket barrage. During the night, she teamed with McCalla (DD-488) for gunfire support, knocking out an enemy gun emplacement and hitting enemy pillboxes inland. On the 16th, she bombarded Isabela City, Basilan Island, creating a diversion while Army troops landed at Kulibato Point to the east. Assisted by spotting aircraft, she shelled a wharf and the area of suspected enemy underground trenches. On the evening of 18 March, she responded to the request of shore fire-control parties by blasting a Japanese troop concentration of about 150 men in the Gumularang River Valley of Basilan Island, giving support to American Army and guerilla troops. She anchored off the Santa Cruz Bank from 20 to 24 March.

Robinson joined Task Group 78.2 at Mangarin Bay on 10 April 1945 and sailed 4 days later. She rescued two Marine aviators from the sea on the 16th. The next day, the task group entered Polloc Harbor of Mindanao and Army troops were landed for the assault against the Malabang-Parang-Cotabato area of Mindanao. Robinson returned to Mangarin Bay with the empty shipping on 24 April and sailed the next day escorting a convoy carrying reinforcements to Polloc Harbor. She cleared that port on 28 April escorting oiler Winooski (AO-38) via Tawi-Tawi, Sulu Archipelago, Philippine Islands, to Muara Batagao, Tarakan, Borneo. She reached her destination on 2 May, the day after the initial assault on Tarakan, and bombarded an enemy-defended ridge north of the airfield and a supply road junction. She got underway from Tarakan Island on 8 May, escorting amphibious ships to the Netherlands East Indies, arriving at Morotai 2 days later.

==== Borneo ====
On 4 June, Robinson sailed with Task Group 78.1 which arrived in Brunei Bay, British Northwest Borneo on 10 June. The landing was unopposed and Robinson joined the antisubmarine screen for Nashville (CL-43) and Phoenix (CL-46) en route to Tawi-Tawi. She then sailed with Philip (DD-498) and arrived at Morotai, 20 June. She again stood out to sea on 26 June in the screen for amphibious ships which landed troops on the beach at Balikpapan, Borneo, on the morning of 1 July 1945. She conducted antisubmarine and picket patrol off Balikpapan until 15 July and returned to Morotai with one echelon of the empty troopships on the 19th. Three days later she teamed with Waller (DD-466) to escort small craft to San Pedro Bay, arriving on the 25th.

Robinson departed San Pedro Bay on 5 August 1945, and arrived at Ulithi, 7 August 1945. She took radar picket station some 50 miles from Ulithi from 10 to 13 August. Three days later she sailed escorting troopship Admiral Benson (AP-120) to San Pedro Bay; then continued on alone to Subic Bay, Luzon, where she arrived on the 21st.

==== China ====
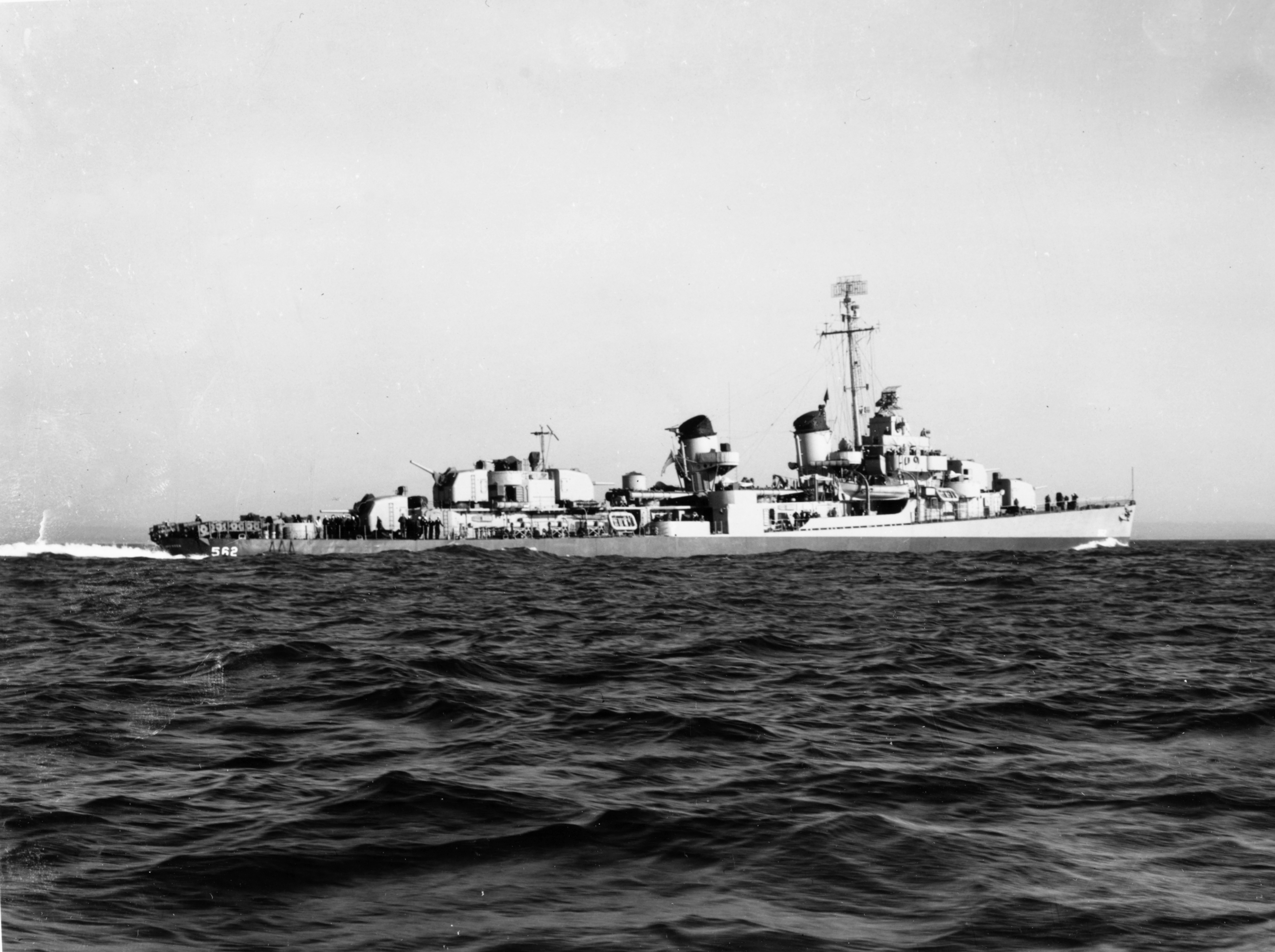
Robinson in January 1946

On 3 September she put to sea with the Yangtze River Patrol Force under Rear Adm. C. Turner Joy, but broke off from the main body to head for Okinawa and arrived in Buckner Bay on the morning of 5 September. That same day Captain Campbell was designated commander of the newly organized Minesweeper Task Group 73.2 with Robinson as flagship. She put to sea with six minesweepers on the night of 5 September; and, 2 days later, the task unit began minesweeping operations in the approaches to and the entrance of the Yangtze. These lasted until December. On the 12th Robinson sailed from Shanghai for the United States and reached San Diego on 30 December.

Robinson, with Waller, Saufley (DD-465), Philip, and Renshaw (DD-499) was assigned to the newly formed Destroyer Division 301 of Destroyer Squadron 30 at San Diego. She cleared San Diego on 12 January 1946 and arrived at Brooklyn, N.Y., on the 26th. She cleared port on 4 March, and entered the Charleston Navy Yard on the 7th for inactivation overhaul, and decommissioned on 12 June 1946.

=== Cold War ===
==== 1951 – 1954 ====
Robinson remained in reserve until recommissioned at the Charleston Naval Shipyard on 3 August 1951. She was assigned to Destroyer Division 321 and on 9 September became the flagship of Destroyer Squadron 32. After sea trials off Charleston, S.C., she arrived at Norfolk, Va. on 2 December for shakedown training in the Chesapeake Bay and off the Virginia Capes. She got underway from Norfolk on 10 January 1952 for maneuvers in the Caribbean Sea and returned on 6 March for squadron tactics and plane guard exercises with Saipan (CVL-48) and Midway (CVB-41) off the Virginia Capes. She subsequently operated off the Atlantic coast and in the Caribbean until getting underway from Norfolk on 29 June 1953 for 6 months in the western Pacific. The destroyer transited the Panama Canal and arrived at Yokosuka, Japan on 3 August 1953. Robinson performed plane guard duty with Carrier Task Force 77 off the coast of Korea, participated in hunter-killer exercises off Kobe, Japan, escorted Point Cruz (CVE-119) to Inchon, Korea, patrolled off the east coast of Korea, and visited Pusan, Asau Wan and Tsushima. Robinson then returned home via the Suez Canal and the Mediterranean, reaching Norfolk on 6 February 1954.

After operations along the Atlantic coast, Robinson made a midshipman practice cruise with battleship Missouri (BB-63) visiting Vigo, Spain, and Le Havre, France, and Guantanamo Bay, Cuba, before returning to Norfolk on 3 August.

==== 1955 – 1958 ====
After operations off the Atlantic coast and in the Caribbean, Robinson was again bound for the Mediterranean in company with Destroyer Squadrons 8 and 32 on 5 November 1955. She visited such Mediterranean ports as Rhodes, Greece; and Beirut, Lebanon; before steaming for Greenwich, England; Antwerp, Belgium; Bremerhaven, Germany; and Edinburgh, Scotland. After independent operations in waters to the north of the Shetland Islands, she arrived at Derry, Northern Ireland on 27 January for antisubmarine warfare and convoy exercises with British warships. This duty terminated 13 February 1956 and Robinson returned to Norfolk on the 22d for antisubmarine operations in the Virginia Capes, and shore bombardment practice at Bloodsworth Island.

Early in June 1956, Robinson embarked midshipmen at Annapolis and cleared Norfolk on 5 June for a midshipman cruise. After exercise "Coppersmith" with units of the Danish Navy, she visited Copenhagen until the 26th, then set course for Chatham, England. She visited Guantanamo Bay before debarking the midshipmen at Annapolis and returning to Norfolk on 1 August.

Robinson cleared Norfolk with Destroyer Squadron 32 on 22 October 1957 and touched at Bermuda before arrival at Gibraltar on 31 October. She put to sea the next day in company with Ross (DD-563) for the Persian Gulf, visiting Piraeus, Greece, and touching at Port Said on 7 November before transit of the Suez Canal for visits to Aden, Arabia; and Massawa, Eritrea. She arrived at Karachi, Pakistan, 25 November 1957. Based at the last named port, she participated in Operation Crescent with Navy warships of Pakistan, Turkey, Great Britain, and Iran. She got underway from Karachi, Pakistan, on 11 December, steamed by way of Massawa, and transited the Suez Canal on the 19th for maneuvers with the 6th Fleet in the Mediterranean. She sailed from Gibraltar on the 16th and arrived at Norfolk on 5 March 1958.

==== 1958 – 1964 ====
Robinson departed Norfolk again on 9 June 1958 on a midshipmen training cruise to A Coruña, Galicia (Spain); Gothenburg, Sweden; and Hamburg, Germany, before debarking the midshipmen at Annapolis on 4 and 5 August. After 7 months of operations from Norfolk, on 8 April 1959, Robinson was assigned to Reserve Destroyer Squadron 4, Destroyer Flotilla 4, U.S. Atlantic Fleet, and began a new career training reservists. On 1 July, the destroyer sailed for Charleston, her new homeport where she operated for the next 5 years.

Robinson decommissioned at Norfolk on 1 April 1964 and was berthed there with the Atlantic Reserve Fleet. She was stricken from the Naval Vessel Register 1 December 1974. The ship was sunk as target off Puerto Rico 13 April 1982.

== Honors ==
Robinson received eight battle stars for World War II service.

== In popular culture ==
The Robinson appeared in the movie "Away All Boats", accurately depicting the Fletcher destroyer class's antiaircraft role in the Pacific Theater by firing at Kamikaze Aircraft during the Battle of Okinawa.
