= Forrest Royal =

Forrest or Forest Royal may refer to:

- Forrest B. Royal (1893–1945), a rear admiral in the United States Navy
- Dizzy Royal (Forest John Royal, 1914–1991), American baseball player
- USS Forrest Royal (DD-872), an American destroyer named after the admiral
