= USS Appalachian =

US Navy amphibious force flagship

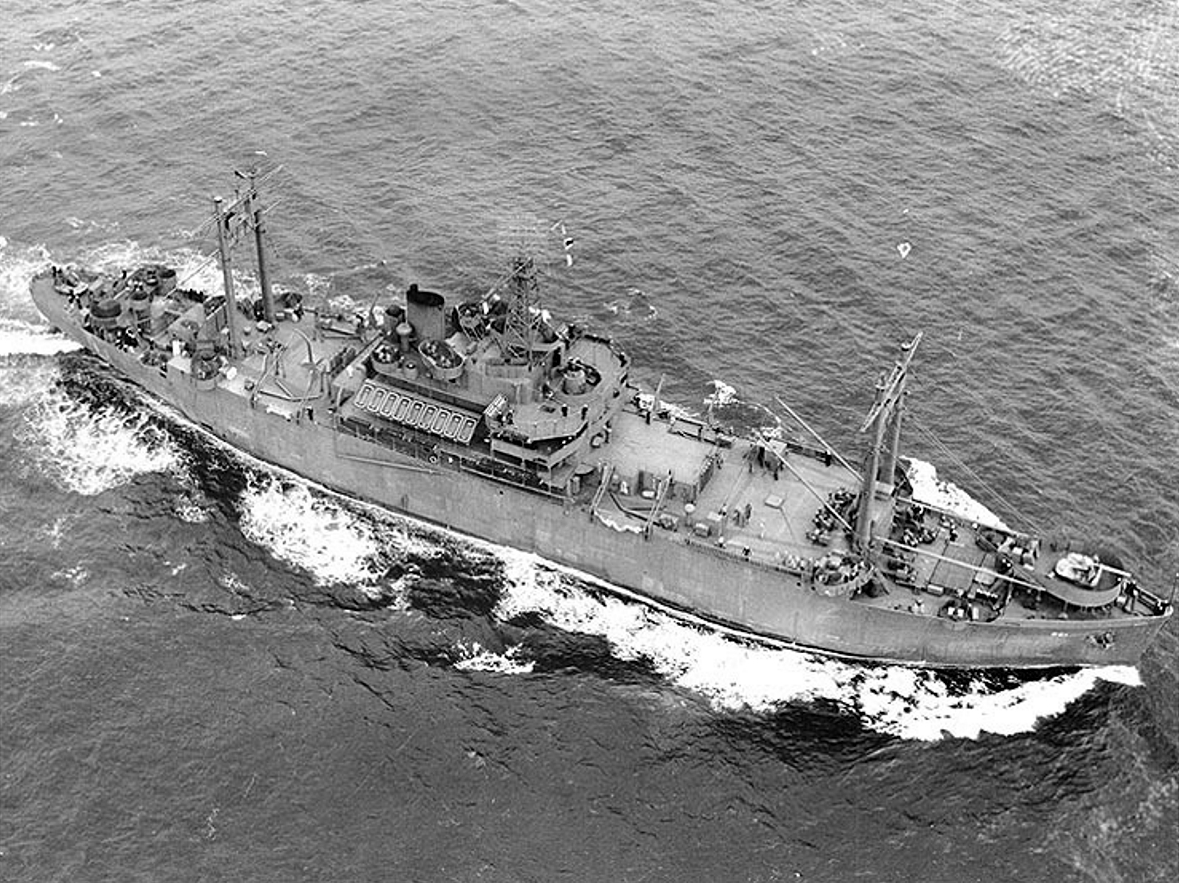
- USS Appalachian under way

History

United States
- Name: Appalachian
- Namesake: Appalachian
- Laid down: 4 November 1942
- Launched: 29 January 1943
- Acquired: 27 February 1943
- Commissioned: 2 October 1943
- Decommissioned: 21 May 1947
- Stricken: 1 March 1960
- Fate: Scrapped

General characteristics
- Class & type: Appalachian-class command ship
- Displacement: 13,710 tons
- Length: 459 ft 3 in (139.98 m)
- Beam: 63 ft (19 m)
- Draught: 24 ft (7.3 m)
- Propulsion: Single shaft turbine
- Speed: 16.4 knots
- Range: 5560km (3000nm) at 16 knots
- Complement: 368
- Armament: 2 × 5 in (130 mm) guns (2x1); 8 × 40 mm guns (4x2); 14 × 20 mm guns (14x1)

USS Appalachian (AGC-1) was the lead ship of the Appalachian class amphibious force flagships of the United States Navy. She was laid down under a Maritime Commission contract (MC hull 200) on 4 November 1942 at the Federal Shipbuilding & Drydock Company in Kearny, New Jersey; launched on 29 January 1943, sponsored by Mrs. John Frank Mclnnis; acquired by the Navy on 27 February 1943; converted at Brooklyn, N.Y., by the Todd Shipbuilding Company for naval service as an amphibious flagship; and commissioned on 2 October 1943.

== World War II service ==
Following shakedown in the Chesapeake Bay, Appalachian headed south; transited the Panama Canal; and reached San Diego, California, on 26 November 1943. There, after elements of the 4th Marine Division had embarked, and Rear Admiral Richard L. Conolly had broken his flag in Appalachian, she got underway on 13 January 1944, bound for Hawaii.

After a one-day stop in Pearl Harbor, the ship steamed westward to take part in the invasion of Kwajalein Atoll, Marshall Islands. The objectives of the northern attack force, which included Appalachian, were the islands of Roi and Namur. The attack opened on 31 January; and the next day, Appalachian entered Kwajalein lagoon and began disembarking the men and equipment of the headquarters battalion of the 4th Marine Division. The area was secured by 5 February. Rear Admiral Conolly shifted his flag to USS Maryland (BB-46), and Appalachian set sail the next day for the Ellice Islands.

Her crew enjoyed a week-long respite at Funafuti before the ship sailed to Guadalcanal. She operated in the Solomon Islands until 29 March when she began a return voyage to Hawaii. The vessel reached Pearl Harbor on 8 April and began resupplying.

Appalachian returned to Guadalcanal in late April, spent the next six weeks preparing for the impending assault on the Marianas, then, early in June, sailed to Kwajalein, the final staging area for the operation.

On 12 June, Appalachian with Major General Roy S. Geiger, USMC, embarked, sortied in a group of transports carrying troops of his III Amphibious Corps. These leathernecks were scheduled to assault Guam. When the force had progressed to within 50 miles of its objective, it was ordered to reverse course to avoid a powerful Japanese fleet which was then approaching the Marianas to contest the American landings.

While the American 5th Fleet routed the Japanese warships in the Battle of the Philippine Sea and American ground forces fought fanatical Japanese defensive forces on Saipan, the convoy steamed in readiness on a rectangular course for 16 days. The Guam attack was then postponed, and the group put in at Eniwetok on 28 June for replenishment. It once more set sail for Guam on 11 July. The ships reached their objective on the 14th, and Appalachian joined in the preassault bombardment that morning and continued providing fire support throughout the invasion. On 30 July, Appalachian dropped anchor in Apra Harbor and remained there through the end of the struggle for the island. Guam was officially secured on 10 August, and Appalachian got underway that day, bound for Pearl Harbor.

Between 21 August and 2 September, Appalachian carried out training exercises off Maui in preparation for an assault on Yap. However, this operation was later canceled. The ship departed Hawaiian waters on 15 September and proceeded to Manus, Admiralty Islands, for additional training.

Appalachian dropped anchor in Seeadler Harbor on 3 October and reported to the 7th Fleet for duty. She sortied on the 14th with invasion forces, bound for Leyte, Philippines. Major General Archibald V. Arnold, Commander of the Army's 7th Infantry Division, was on board Appalachian. The landings on Leyte, which began on 20 October, met little opposition. After her troops had gone ashore, the ship stood by to supply provisions and freshwater to smaller craft in the area until the 23rd, then headed for New Guinea, and arrived in Humboldt Bay five days later.

The ship sailed on for Nouméa, New Caledonia, on 20 November. After her arrival there on 26 November, the crew enjoyed a period of liberty. Appalachian sailed for the Solomons on 17 December, engaged briefly in invasion rehearsals at Guadalcanal, and stood out to sea on Christmas Day bound for Manus.

For Appalachian, the year 1945 began with the invasion of the Philippine island of Luzon. She reached Lingayen Gulf on 11 January, landed her troops, and departed the following day. As she was steaming through the South China Sea, she was attacked by Japanese planes. However, she was able to evade the attackers and reached Leyte Gulf on the 15th.

Appalachian sailed east on 18 January and made port calls at Ulithi and Pearl Harbor before reaching San Francisco, Calif., on 13 February. She entered the Mare Island Navy Yard, Vallejo, Calif., on Valentine's Day to begin overhaul. The ship set out once more for Hawaiian waters on 10 April, arrived in Pearl Harbor on the 16th, and began training exercises off Maui.

She sailed for the Marianas on 16 May, and reached Saipan 11 days later. The vessel remained at anchor there until 9 July, when she got underway for the Philippines. She pulled into Manila on 13 July and operated in waters of the archipelago through the end of World War II.

Appalachian won four battle stars for her World War II service.

== Post-war service ==
The ship set out for occupation duty in Japan on 18 September, arrived at Aomori at the northern end of Honshū on the 25th, and landed troops who took possession of the town. Soldiers whom she carried also occupied other cities including Ominato, Hakodate, Otaru, Yokohama, Yokosuka, Matsuyama, and Hiroshima.

Appalachian departed Japan on 22 November 1945, bound for the west coast of the United States. After reaching the United States, she remained at San Francisco until 12 April 1946 when she was assigned to Joint Task Force 1 which was being established for Operation Crossroads, the atomic bomb tests to be carried out that summer at Bikini Atoll. During the months of May, June, and July, Appalachian served as a headquarters for press representatives before returning to San Francisco on 16 August.

She became the flagship of the Fifth Fleet on 13 September and also served the Pacific Fleet in a similar role between 28 October 1946 and 30 January 1947. During this time, the vessel operated out of San Diego. She was decommissioned there on 21 May 1947 and placed in reserve. She was subsequently transferred to the Maritime Administration for disposal, and she was scrapped in 1960. Her name was struck from the Navy list on 1 March 1959.
