= USS Catoctin =

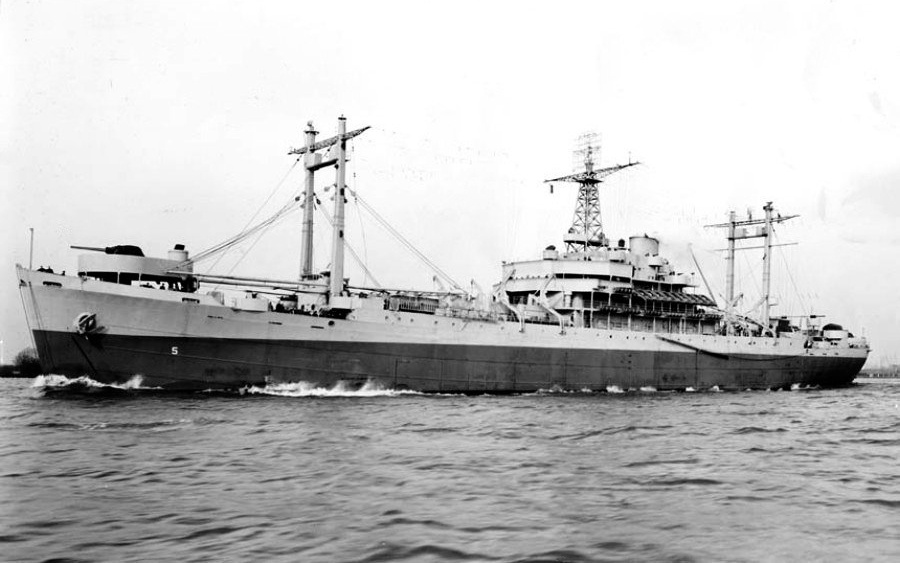
- USS Catoctin in February 1944

History

United States
- Name: Catoctin
- Namesake: Catoctin Mountain
- Builder: Moore Dry Dock Company
- Launched: 23 January 1943
- Acquired: 31 August 1943
- Commissioned: 31 August 1943
- Decommissioned: 26 February 1947
- Fate: Scrapped in 1960

General characteristics
- Class & type: Appalachian-class command ship
- Displacement: 7,430 tons
- Length: 459 ft 3 in
- Beam: 63 ft
- Draught: 24 ft
- Speed: 16.4 kts
- Complement: 633 officers and enlisted
- Armament: 2 5 in (130 mm)

USS Catoctin (AGC-5) was an Appalachian-class amphibious force flagship in the United States Navy during World War II. She was named for Catoctin Mountain.

== Commissioning and 1944 ==
Catocin was launched as SS Mary Whitridge 23 January 1943 by Moore Dry Dock Company, Oakland, California, under a Maritime Commission contract; sponsored by Miss A. H. Morton; acquired by the Navy 31 August 1943; and commissioned as Catoctin the same day.

Between 14 September and 11 October 1943, Catoctin sailed from Long Beach, California, to Philadelphia, where she was decommissioned upon arrival. Converted to a combined operations and communications headquarters ship, Catoctin was recommissioned 24 January 1944 and reported to Atlantic Fleet.

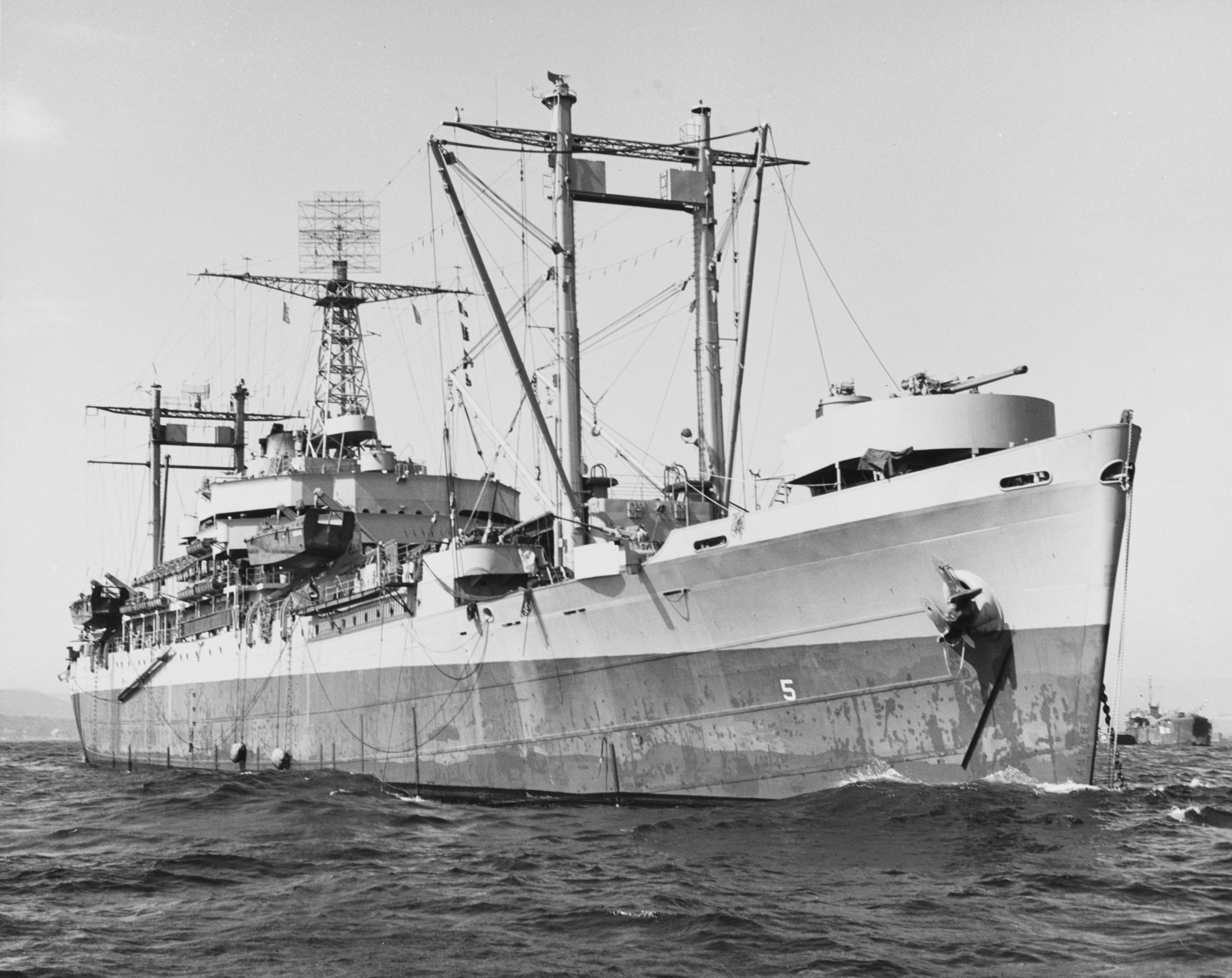
USS Catocin off southern France for Operation Dragoon

Shakedown complete, Catoctin cleared Norfolk 5 March 1944 for Algiers, where she reported on 19 March as flagship for Commander, 8th Fleet. She remained at Algiers and later Oran until 8 July, when she sailed to Naples, Italy. On 24 July, at Naples, King George VI of the United Kingdom visited on board the ship. For several months, Catoctin had been headquarters for the planning of the Invasion of Southern France, and on 13 August, she sailed from Naples for the assault, carrying Secretary of the Navy James Forrestal, and the commanders of the 7th Army, VI Corps, 12th Air Force, and French Naval Forces.

At early dawn of 15 August 1944, Catoctin arrived in position off the planned assault beaches. Her antennae were used to relay information to troops during the operartion. On 18 August, 6 of her crew were killed and 31 wounded by exploding shrapnel during a German air raid. Arriving at Toulon 9 September, Catoctin greeted the return to France of the French fleet and General Charles de Gaulle on 15 September. On 25 September, she cleared Toulon for Naples, her base for the remainder of the year.

== 1945 ==
Catoctin left Naples 15 January 1945, and after a brief repair period at Palermo, Sicily, sailed to Sevastopol, Russia. Arriving 26 January, she served as communications ship and as headquarters for the advance party planning the Yalta Conference. Her crew operated transportation, canteen, hospital, and dental facilities ashore, and in cooperation with other Allied facilities, operated an air-sea rescue net. On 11 February, she welcomed President Franklin D. Roosevelt and his party, including Fleet Admiral William D. Leahy, for an overnight stay. Catoctin cleared Sevastopol 15 February, returning to Naples 5 days later, then sailed for Oran.

The command ship embarked military passengers at Oran, and proceeded to Philadelphia, where she underwent overhaul, followed by refresher training. On 20 June, she stood down Delaware Bay, bound for Pearl Harbor, where she arrived in July. Underway once more on 10 August, Catoctin arrived at Incheon, Korea, 8 September to accept the surrender of Japanese forces there. She sailed to Okinawa to embark Marines whom she transported to Taku, North China, where they were to maintain order until the representatives of China's Nationalist Government could establish their government. During October and most of November, Catoctin was headquarters for negotiations with the Chinese Communists, in power in Shandong and Manchuria, in which attempts were made to allow the officially recognized Nationalist Government to reestablish itself.

== Deactivation ==
Catoctin stood out of Shanghai, China, 25 November 1945 for Norfolk, where she arrived 28 December. She served from this port as flagship for Commander Amphibious Force, Atlantic, until 18 September 1946, then underwent inactivation. On 26 February 1947, she was decommissioned at Philadelphia, and placed in service in reserve. On 30 December 1959, Catoctin was transferred to the Maritime Administration. She was sold for scrapping and subsequently scrapped in 1959–60, by Walsh Construction Co., South Portland, Maine.
