= Appalachian-class command ship =

Class of command ships of the United States Navy

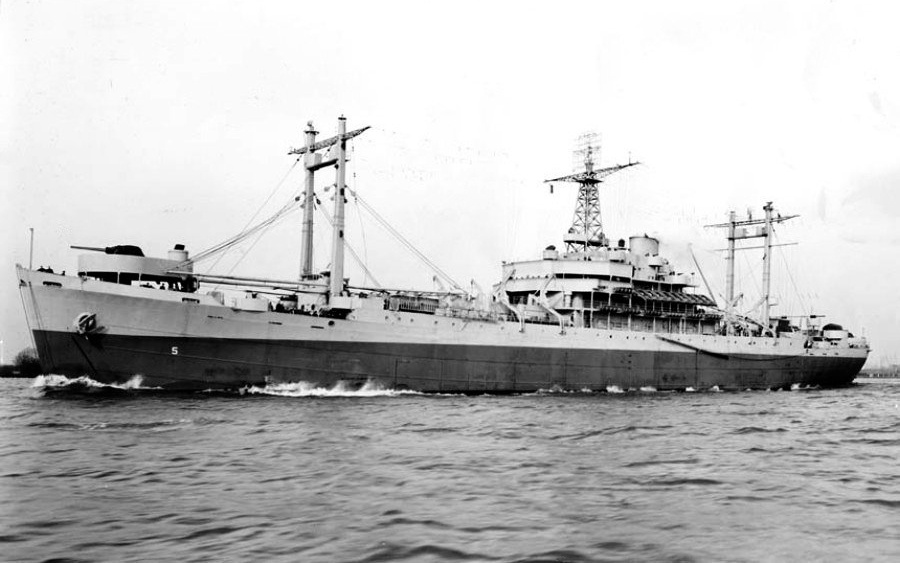
- USS Catoctin in 1944

Class overview
- Name: Appalachian class
- Builders: Federal Shipbuilding and Drydock Co.; Moore Dry Dock Co.
- Operators: United States Navy
- Succeeded by: Mount McKinley class
- Built: 1942–1943
- In service: 1943–1947
- Planned: 4
- Completed: 4
- Retired: 4

General characteristics
- Type: Command ship; type C2-S-B1
- Displacement: 7,431 t (7,314 long tons), light load; 13,910 t (13,690 long tons), full load
- Length: 459 ft 3 in (139.98 m)
- Beam: 63 ft (19 m)
- Draft: 24 ft 0 in (7.32 m)
- Installed power: 6,000 shp (4,474 kW)
- Propulsion: 1 × General Electric geared Steam turbine; 2 × Combustion Engineering D-type 465 psi (3,206 kPa) boilers; 1 × propeller
- Speed: 16.4 knots (30.4 km/h; 18.9 mph)
- Capacity: 104,136 L (27,510 US gal) diesel; 3,735,883 L (986,916 US gal) NSFO
- Troops: 128 officers; 334 enlisted
- Complement: 36 officers; 442 enlisted
- Sensors & processing systems: 1 × SK-1 air-search radar
- Armament: 2 × single 5"/38 caliber guns; 18 × single Oerlikon 20 mm cannons; 4 × twin Bofors 40 mm guns

The Appalachian-class command ship was a ship class of command ships of the United States Navy during World War II. All 4 ships were converted from the Type C2-S-B1 cargo ships.

== Development ==
Four type C2 cargo ships were converted into command ships for the United States Navy throughout the middle stages of World War II. After the war, all were slightly modernized and decommissioned in 1947 to be later scrapped.

The ship's hull remained nearly the same but with new equipment to carry out her purpose now placed on deck alongside several cranes. The ships' armaments had been slightly changed and relocated in order for the ships to carry out their new roles. All ships served in the Pacific Theater until the end of the war with no ships lost in combat.

== Ships in the class ==
Appalachian class command ship							
Hull no.	Name	Builder	Laid down	Launched	Commissioned	Decommissioned	Fate
AGC-1	Appalachian	Federal Shipbuilding and Drydock Co.	4 November 1942	29 January 1943	2 October 1943	21 May 1947	Scrapped, 1960
AGC-2	Blue Ridge	Federal Shipbuilding and Drydock Co.	4 December 1942	7 March 1943	27 September 1943	14 March 1947	Scrapped, 18 August 1960
AGC-3	Rocky Mount	Federal Shipbuilding and Drydock Co.	4 December 1942	7 March 1943	16 October 1943	22 March 1947	Scrapped, 1 March 1973
AGC-5	Catoctin	Moore Dry Dock Co.	1942	23 January 1943	24 January 1944	26 February 1947	Scrapped, 1959–1960
