= USS Robinson (DD-88) =

Wickes-class destroyer

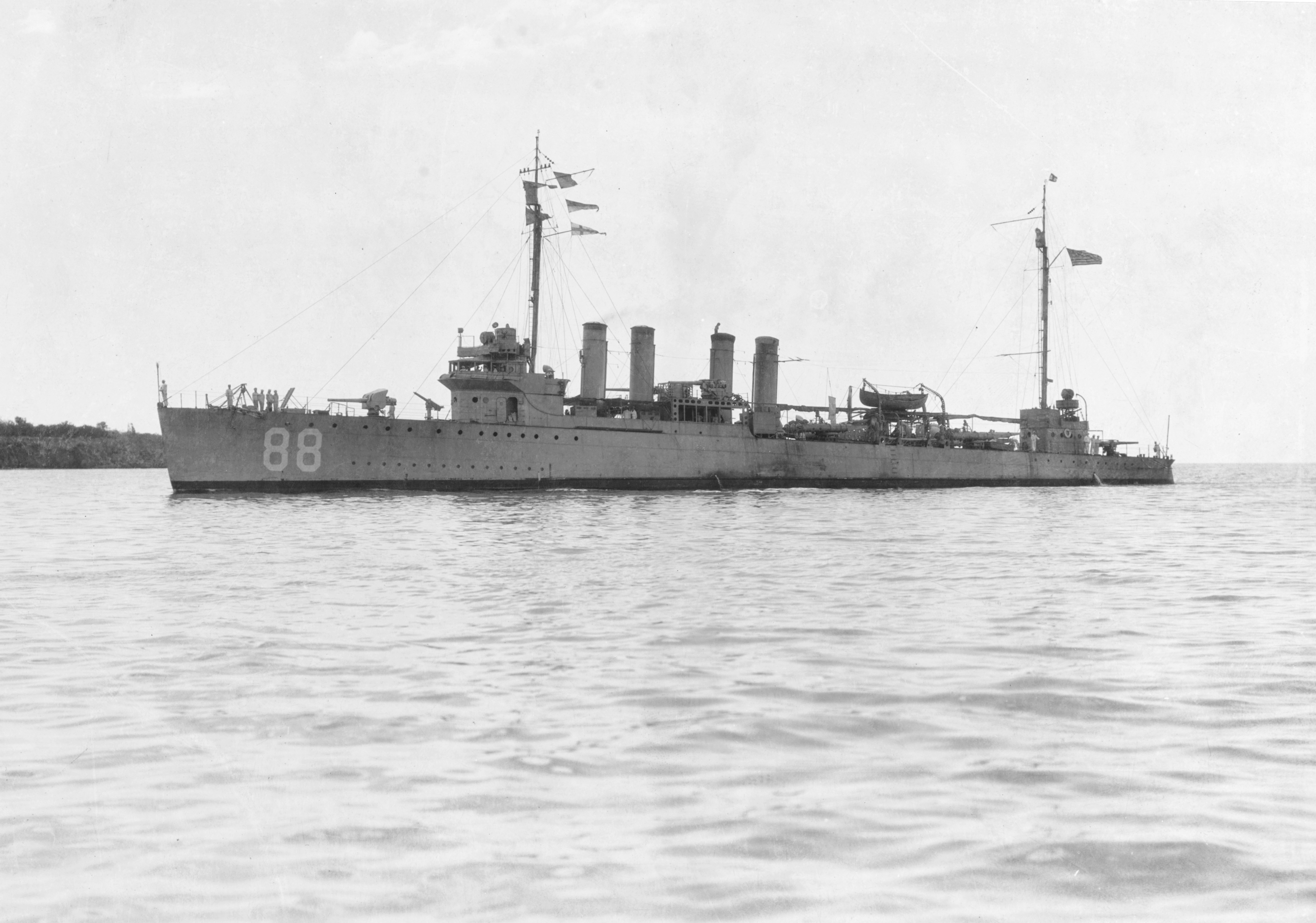
- USS Robinson (DD-88) at Guantanamo Bay, Cuba, in January 1920.

History

United States
- Name: USS Robinson
- Namesake: Isaiah Robinson
- Builder: Union Iron Works, San Francisco, California
- Laid down: 31 October 1917
- Launched: 28 March 1918
- Commissioned: 19 October 1918
- Decommissioned: 3 August 1922
- Recommissioned: 23 August 1940
- Stricken: 8 January 1941
- Identification: DD-88
- Fate: Transferred to United Kingdom, 5 December 1940

United Kingdom
- Name: HMS Newmarket
- Commissioned: 5 December 1940
- Decommissioned: 1944
- Fate: Scrapped September 1945

General characteristics
- Class & type: Wickes-class destroyer
- Displacement: 1,220 tons
- Length: 314 ft 4 in (95.81 m)
- Beam: 30 ft 6 in (9.30 m)
- Draft: 8 ft 6 in (2.59 m)
- Speed: 35 knots (65 km/h; 40 mph)
- Complement: 140 officers and enlisted
- Armament: 4 × 4 in (102 mm)/50 guns; 2 × 1-pounders; 12 × 21 inch (533 mm) torpedo tubes

USS Robinson (DD-88) was a Wickes-class destroyer in the United States Navy, later transferred to the Royal Navy, as HMS Newmarket (G47). She was the first ship named for Isaiah Robinson.

She was laid down 31 October 1917 by the Union Iron Works, San Francisco, California, launched 28 March 1918, sponsored by Miss Evelyn Tingey Selfridge, and commissioned at the Mare Island Navy Yard on 19 October 1918.

== Construction and design ==
In 1916, the US Congress authorized a massive three-year shipbuilding program, with the aim of matching the largest navy in the world, the British Royal Navy. The program included 50 destroyers, which were to be built to a modified version of the Caldwell class, designed to reach 35 knots (65 km/h; 40 mph) rather than the 30 knots (56 km/h; 35 mph) of the Caldwells. As such, the new design, the Wickes class, had more powerful machinery with geared steam turbines, but retained the same flush-decked layout and armament used by the Caldwells. The Wickes were built to one of two detailed designs, one design by Bethlehem Steel, used by the two Bethlehem-owned shipyards, Union Iron Works and the Fore River Shipyard, while the design by Bath Iron Works was used by all other shipyards involved in the program.

Robinson was one of 20 destroyers ordered as the first stage of the construction plan, under the Fiscal year 1917 construction program. She was laid down at Union Iron Works' San Francisco yard on 31 October 1917, was launched on 28 March 1918 and commissioned at the Mare Island Naval Shipyard on 19 October 1918.

The Bethlehem-designed ships, like Robinson, were 314 ft 4 1/2 in (95.82 m) long overall and 310 ft 0 in (94.49 m) at the waterline, with a beam of 30 ft 11 1/2 in (9.44 m) and a draft of 9 ft 2 in (2.79 m). Displacement was 1,090 long tons (1,107 t) normal and 1,247 long tons (1,267 t) full load. Four Yarrow boilers fed steam to geared sets of steam turbines and driving two shafts The machinery was designed to give 27,000 shp (20,000 kW), giving a design speed of 35 knots (65 km/h; 40 mph). 225 tons of oil were carried, giving a design range of 2,500 nautical miles (4,600 km; 2,900 mi) at 20 knots (37 km/h; 23 mph).

== Service history ==
=== United States Navy ===
Robinson cleared San Francisco Bay 24 October 1918 for the east coast of the United States. Transiting the Panama Canal 3 November 1918, she set course by way of Guantanamo Bay for Norfolk, Virginia where she arrived on 8 November.

On 10 January 1919, Robinson put to sea from Norfolk to conduct winter training out of Guantanamo Bay, which ended at New York Harbor 14 April 1919. She then prepared for lifeguard duty supporting the first transatlantic flight from America to Europe to be attempted by Navy Seaplane Division Number 1.

Robinson got underway from Norfolk on 30 April, arrived at Halifax, Nova Scotia, 4 May 1919, and stood out toward the entrance of the harbor on the afternoon of 8 May. At 1944, she sighted the first of the Navy seaplanes, the NC-3, approach the harbor on the first leg of the transatlantic flight. Two days later, Robinson took station at sea to assist in guarding the flight of the two seaplanes to Trepassey Bay, Newfoundland, then returned to Halifax 11 May and got underway on 14 May to act as plane guard for seaplane NC-4 which had been delayed by repairs at Chatham Naval Air Station, and passed overhead at 1645, on 15 May, to join the other two seaplanes at Trepassey Bay.

After NC-4 faded from view, Robinson set course for station on the Azores route to be followed by the seaplanes from Trepassey Bay, 16 May 1919. These seaplanes would be guided on their 1,380-mile flight to the Azores, by Robinson and other destroyers who poured smoke from their funnels in daylight and fired starshells or turned on searchlights during the night. The first seaplane passed Robinson abeam an hour before midnight of 16 May 1919, and the two others also passed within the next 20 minutes.

The NC-4 covered the flight in 15 hours and 13 minutes setting down at Horta, the emergency stop in the Azores Islands. This seaplane had found its way above the dense fog which completely blinded the pilots of the others. An hour before the NC-4 landed, the NC-1 was forced to the water about 45 miles (72 km) off Flores Island and the NC-3 had also descended about 35 miles (56 km) from Fayal. The NC-1 sank in the heavy seas and Robinson joined in the search for the NC-3 which refused all assistance and finally taxied to Ponta Delgada under its own power.

Robinson anchored at Horta, Fayal Island, the afternoon of 19 May and stood out of the harbor the next morning to transport newspaper reports to Ponta Delgada where she arrived that afternoon. On 25 May 1919, she was en route to Station Number Seven (38°10′N 17°40′E) to cover the fourth leg of the transoceanic flight of the lone NC-4. She sighted the seaplane at 1330 on the afternoon of 26 May and the NC-4 faded from view on its way to a royal welcome by the Portuguese at Lisbon on 25 May and at Plymouth, England, on 31 May, terminating the historic 4,500-mile flight.

Robinson returned to Ponta Delgada on 28 May 1919 and put to sea on 2 June to arrive at Newport on 8 June. She underwent overhaul in the Norfolk Navy Yard and conducted operations in local areas of Newport until her arrival at New York on 30 September 1919. She joined five other destroyers off Sandy Hook on the afternoon of 1 October, then made rendezvous off Fire Island with George Washington to act as honor escort for the King of Belgium. She cleared port on 6 October for operations off Key West and Pensacola, Florida, visiting Beaufort, South Carolina, on her return voyage to New York where she arrived 5 November 1919.

On 22 November 1919, Robinson stood out of New York Harbor, leading the second section of the honor detachment on the port quarter of HMS Renown, flying the standard of the Prince of Wales, in company with HMS Constance. She was relieved of her royal escort duty off Nantucket Shoals and returned to New York on 25 November. After a visit to Savannah, and voyage repairs in the Portsmouth Navy Yard, she cleared Boston Harbor on 14 January 1920 for fleet maneuvers off Guantanamo Bay and near the Panama Canal. She returned to New York on 1 May 1920 and entered the Portsmouth Navy Yard on 25 May 1920 for a year of inactivity. She shifted from the yard to Newport on 25 May 1921 for local operations until 10 October, and then visited New York before her arrival at Charleston, South Carolina, on 19 November 1921. After several months in local waters off Charleston, she entered the Philadelphia Navy Yard where she decommissioned 3 August 1922.

Robinson remained inactive until 23 August 1940 when she recommissioned for transfer to the British Government under terms of the destroyers-in-exchange-for-bases agreement. The transfer was effected at Halifax, Nova Scotia, on 26 November 1940 when Robinson was renamed HMS Newmarket (G47) and taken over by a care and maintenance party of the Royal Canadian Navy. She was commissioned in the Royal Navy on 5 December 1940, and struck from the U.S. Navy list 8 January 1941.

=== Royal Navy ===
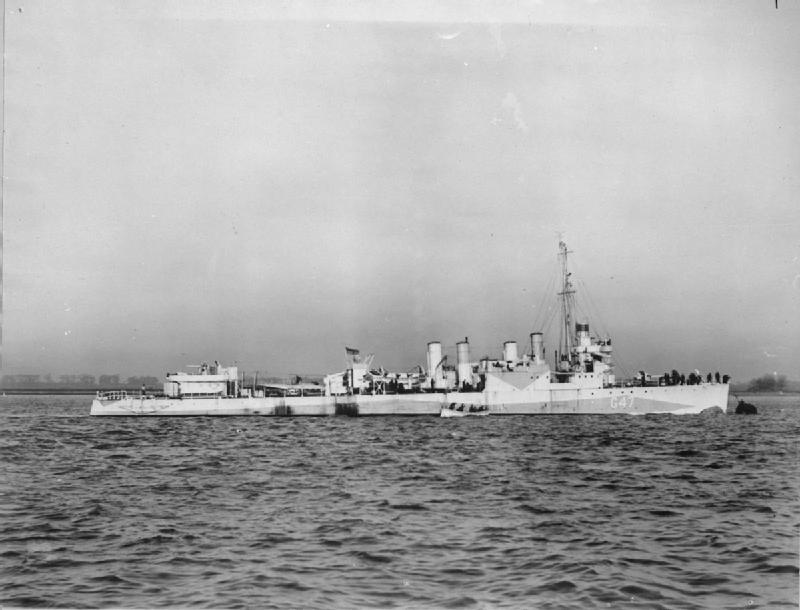
Robinson as HMS Newmarket (G47).

Newmarket departed Halifax on 15 January for the United Kingdom, calling at St. John's and arriving at Belfast on 26 January and at Plymouth, England, on 30 January.

After a short refit in the Humber, she began convoy escort work in the Western Approaches Command and on 2 June 1941, was unsuccessfully attacked by an aircraft in the northwestern approaches. Later that month she proceeded to Sheerness, and was in dockyard hands until November when she joined the 8th Escort Group, at Derry. Newmarket was modified for trade convoy escort service by removal of three of the original 4-inch (102 mm)/50 and one of the triple torpedo tube mounts to reduce topside weight for additional depth charge stowage and installation of hedgehog.

On 3 January 1942, Newmarket had to leave Convoy HX 166 because of boiler trouble, and proceeded to Lough Foyle. On 30 January 1942 she arrived at Liverpool, and was under refit until the end of March 1942.

In April 1942, she escorted the Russian convoy PQ-14, but a month later, she was allocated for duty as an aircraft target ship in the Firth of Forth. She refitted at Leith between December 1942 and February 1943, and later in the year, refitted again at Rosyth, Scotland. In September 1943, Newmarket was reduced to care and maintenance status at Rosyth but resumed duty as an aircraft target ship from the spring of 1944, until after the end of the war in Europe. She was scrapped at Llanelli in September 1945.
