= USS Blue Ridge (AGC-2) =

US Navy amphibious force flagship

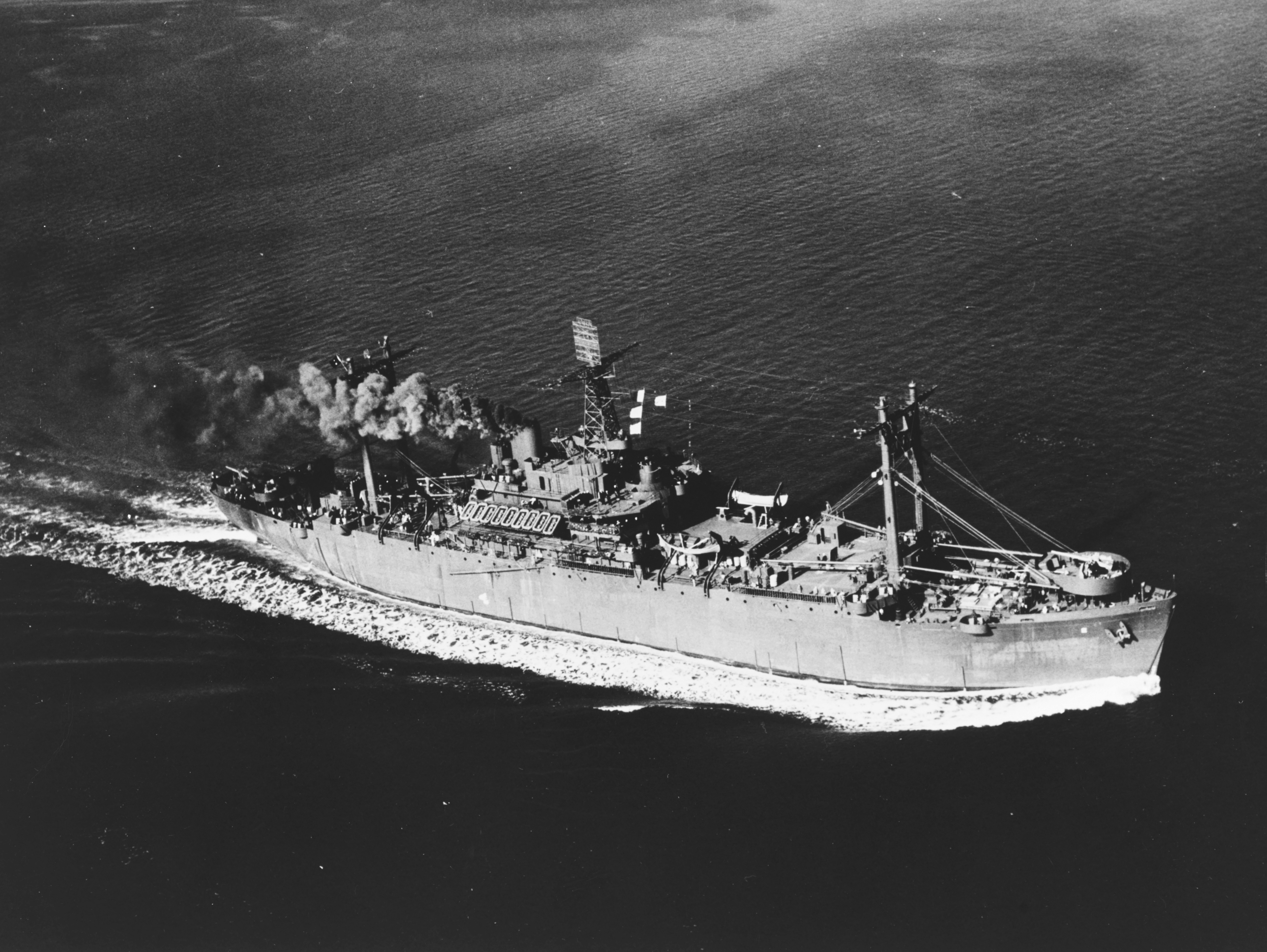
- USS Blue Ridge underway, 6 October 1943

History

United States
- Name: Blue Ridge
- Namesake: Blue Ridge Mountains
- Builder: Federal Shipbuilding and Dry Dock Company, Kearny, New Jersey
- Launched: 7 March 1943
- Acquired: 15 March 1943
- Commissioned: 27 September 1943
- Decommissioned: 14 March 1947
- Stricken: 1 January 1960
- Identification: Hull number: AGC-2; Callsign: NTAE
- Honours and awards: 2 battle stars; Navy Occupation Service Medal; China Service Medal; Philippine Presidential Unit Citation Badge
- Fate: Sold for scrap, 26 August 1960

General characteristics
- Class & type: Appalachian-class command ship
- Displacement: 13,910 long tons (14,133 t)
- Length: 459 ft 3 in (139.98 m)
- Beam: 63 ft (19 m)
- Draft: 24 ft (7.3 m)
- Speed: 16.6 knots (30.7 km/h; 19.1 mph)
- Complement: Crew: 36 officers, 442 enlisted; Staff: 138 officers, 123 enlisted
- Armament: 2 × 5"/38 caliber guns; 4 × twin 40 mm AA guns

USS Blue Ridge (AGC-2) was an Appalachian-class amphibious force flagship in the United States Navy. She was named for the southeasternmost ridge of the Appalachian Mountains in Virginia and North Carolina.

== Commissioning ==
Blue Ridge was built by the Federal Shipbuilding and Dry Dock Company, Kearny, New Jersey, under a Maritime Commission contract. The ship was launched on 7 March 1943 under the sponsorship of Mrs. David Arnott. Blue Ridge was transferred to the Navy on 15 March 1943. The Bethlehem Steel Company of Brooklyn, New York, outfitted the ship as an amphibious force flagship and was commissioned on 27 September 1943..

== Service history ==
=== 1943-1944 ===
Following trial runs in Long Island Sound, Blue Ridge departed New York on 8 October 1943, to train in the Chesapeake Bay Area out of Norfolk, Virginia. On 1 November, the ship put to sea with two destroyers, bound for the South Pacific. After transit of the Panama Canal, Blue Ridge called at the Society, New Caledonia and Fiji Islands, en route to Brisbane, Australia, arriving on 16 December 1943. She pulled out of Brisbane three days later for Milne Bay, New Guinea where 24 December 1943, she became the flagship of Rear Admiral Daniel E. Barbey, USN, Commander Seventh Amphibious Force. She served as the command ship for amphibious operations westward along the New Guinea Coast until 13 October 1944. On that day, Blue Ridge left Hollandia (currently known as Jayapura) as the flagship of Rear Admiral Barbey's Northern Attack Force bound for the liberation of the Philippine Islands.

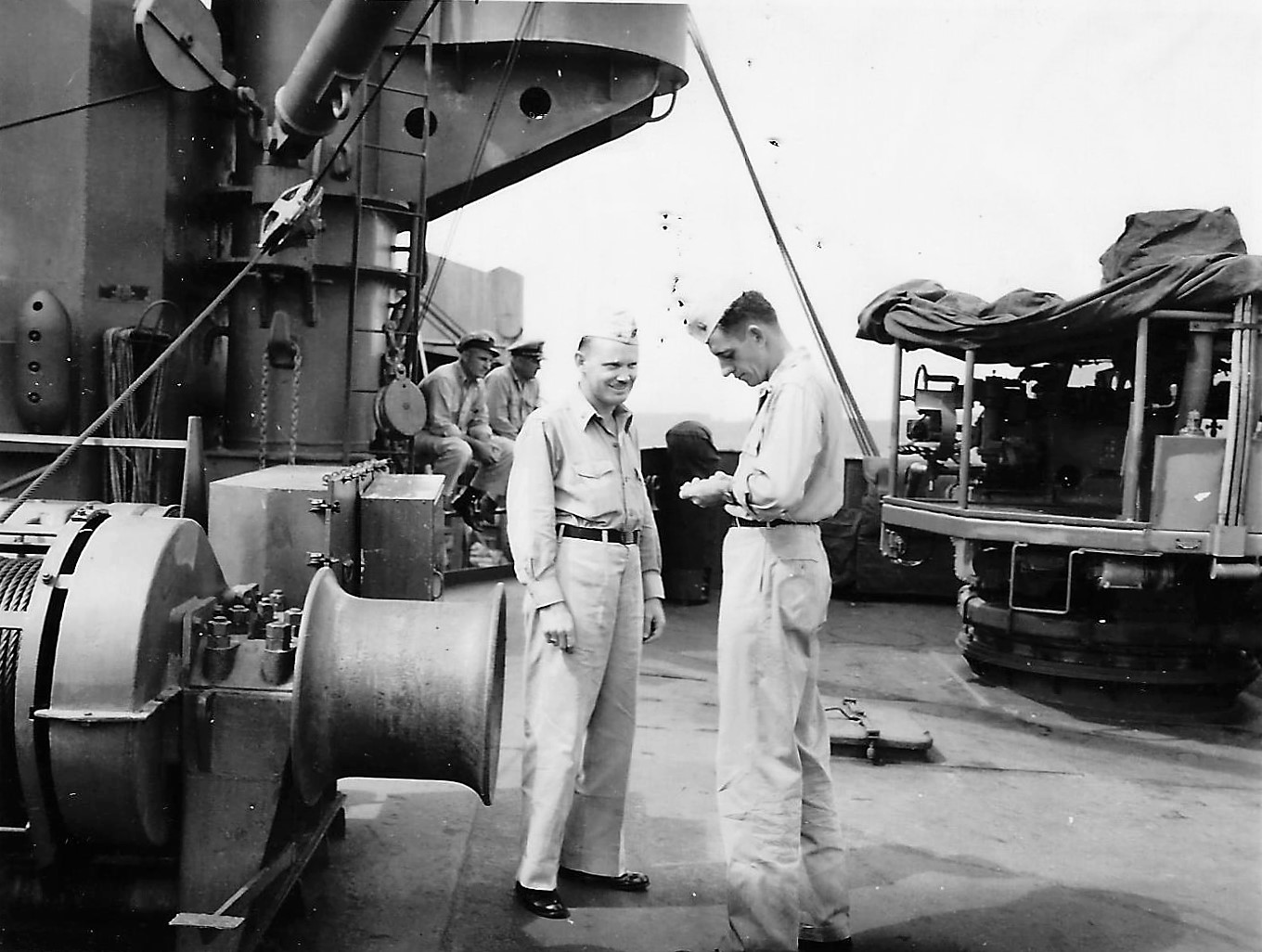
During a ceremony on deck while anchored at Holandia, New Guinea (now Jayapura, Indonesia).

On the night of 19/20 October 1944 Blue Ridge and her formation stood through the swept part of Surigao Strait, between Homonhon and Dinagat Islands and entered San Pedro Bay, Leyte, Philippine Islands. She served as a command ship for troops storming the beaches at Leyte the morning of 20 October, and continued in support of the amphibious assault landings for six days. The ship's gunners drove off an enemy reconnaissance plane 23 October. The morning of 25 October, a torpedo-bomber made a run along her port side, coming in from her port quarter, and was shot down by her forward 40 mm gunners. That afternoon, the ship fired on 11 enemy planes of various types attacking the transport area.

The morning of 26 October 1944, Blue Ridge helped fight off five enemy bombers that attacked her formation. That afternoon she helped drive away three more enemy bombers. Several bombs fell in the vicinity during this action, but only one exploded close enough to shake the command ship. As she kept watch off the Leyte beaches, the three-pronged attack of the Japanese Fleet met disaster in the Battle of Surigao Strait, the Battle off Samar and the Battle off Cape Engaño. She stood out of San Pedro Bay in the night of 26 October 1944 to stage at ports of New Guinea in preparation for the liberation landings to be made at Lingayen. She remained the flagship of Vice Admiral Barbey who was designated commander of the San Fabian Attack Force 78. Besides Admiral Barbey and his staff, she embarked Major General Innis P. Swift, commanding the I Army Corps, and Major General Leonard F. Wing, commanding the 43rd Infantry Division, together with their personal staffs.

Blue Ridge led the San Fabian Attack Force from Aitape, New Guinea on 28 December 1944. An aerial snooper was driven off by gunfire on 2 January 1945 and covering escort carrier aircraft shot down a bomber twenty miles out from her formation the following day. The night of 4 January 1945 the command ship followed a covering group of cruisers and destroyers through Surigao Strait to enter the Mindanao Sea. On the afternoon of 5 January an enemy submarine fired on the covering group, ten miles ahead, and was forced to surface and rammed by destroyer Dashiell. Enemy planes attacked the formation 7 January; two being shot down by pilots of the Combat Air Patrol, and three fell victims to combined anti-aircraft fire of the formation. That night four destroyers sank a Japanese destroyer eleven miles to the east of Blue Ridge. The command ship helped repel six enemy planes on 8 January 1945 and entered Lingayen Gulf before daybreak of 9 January. Troops stormed ashore that morning, some two hours after a single-engine enemy aircraft sneaked through cover of night, strafed to a point forward of the bow, barely missed the bridge, then overshot and dropped bombs about 500 yards off her port bow. The ship was not damaged and suffered no casualties. During the initial landings, three air attacks came close enough to be a threat to Blue Ridge, but veered off in the face of heavy anti-suicide swimmers and small fast suicide boats. To combat this threat, a patrol boat was kept circling Blue Ridge and all shipboard security patrols were strengthened.

=== 1945 ===
On 13 January 1945 Chief Storekeeper H. G. Williamson reported on board Blue Ridge. He was an escaped prisoner of war, having been captured by the Japanese on 18 January 1942, while attached to the Naval Air Station at Cavite. He had escaped on 15 March 1942 and had remained in hiding near San Fabian since then. Williamson was returned to duty at the Naval Base and Blue Ridge departed Lingayen Gulf on 15 January 1945. The ship continued to serve as Vice Admiral Barbey's flagship at San Pedro Bay and Subic Bay until 8 June 1945. Two days later, Blue Ridge was underway for Saipan and then to Pearl Harbor when she became the flagship of Rear Admiral Jerauld Wright, Commander Amphibious Group Five on 30 June 1945. She hauled down his flag on 20 July and entered the Pearl Harbor Naval Shipyard for alterations and repairs.

Blue Ridge departed Pearl Harbor on 8 September 1945 and reached Buckner Bay, Okinawa, on 22 September. That afternoon, she hoisted the flag of Rear Admiral Ingolf N. Kiland, Commander Amphibious Group Seven. The ship got underway on 21 October to serve as a command ship at Tsingtao, China, arriving 24 October 1945. Rear Admiral Kiland shifted his flag to USS Wasatch (AGC-9) on 6 November 1945 and Blue Ridge became the flagship of Rear Admiral Albert G. Noble, Commander Amphibious Group One.

=== 1946-1947 ===
The ship departed Tsingtao for Jinsen, Korea on 13 December 1945, then returned off Taku Bar before proceeding to Shanghai, China. She arrived in the Woosung Anchorage of the Yangtze River on 22 December 1945, and served as station command ship for Naval Forces there until 24 February 1946, when the ship departed Shanghai for Hawaii. After a brief stay at Pearl Harbor, she was routed to the western seaboard, arriving at San Pedro, Los Angeles on 18 March 1946. The ship entered the Naval Shipyard at Terminal Island to prepare for participation in "Operation Crossroads", the atomic bomb tests to be carried out at Bikini Atoll, Marshall Islands.

Blue Ridge departed San Francisco on 12 June 1946, touching at Honolulu, Hawaii, en route to Kwajalein Atoll where she arrived 28 June 1946. Here the ship completed embarking general and flag officers of the Army, Navy and Marine Corps along with United Nations officials for transportation to Bikini Atoll to observe Atomic Bomb Tests. She hoisted the flag of Vice Admiral Harry W. Hill. The senior officer on board was Vice Admiral Edward L. Cochrane, Chief of the Bureau of Ships. Also on board were Vice Admiral George F. Hussey and Vice Admiral Alfred E. Montgomery.

The ship arrived at Bikini Atoll on 29 June 1946, serving as one of the command and observation ships off Bikini during the Atomic Bomb Test "Able" on 1 July. Thereafter, she called at Ponape and Truk in the Caroline Islands, then proceeded to Kwajalein where, on 23 July, Blue Ridge became the flagship of Rear Admiral C. C. Glover. The ship again served as observation flagship for the atomic bomb test of 24 July, hauled down Rear Admiral Glover's flag on 27 July, and sailed for home on 30 July. She arrived at San Francisco inactivation overhaul in the Naval Shipyard at Terminal Island; she decommissioned on 14 March 1947.

The ship remained in reserve until 1 January 1960, when her name was struck from the Navy List. She was sold for scrapping 26 August 1960 to Zidell Exploration Incorporated, Portland, Oregon.

== Awards ==
USS Blue Ridge (AGC-2) received the Asiatic-Pacific Campaign Medal with two battle stars and other awards for the operations listed below:

- One Star/Leyte operation : Leyte Landings: 13–30 October 1944
- One Star/Luzon operation : Lingayen Gulf Landings: 9–14 January 1945
- China Service Medal : 22 September 1945 – 24 February 1946
- World War II Victory Medal (United States)
- Navy Occupation Service Medal (Asia Clasp) : 22 September 1945 – 24 February 1946
- Philippine Republic Presidential Unit Citation Badge
