= USS Sachem (1776) =

Sloop of the Continental Navy

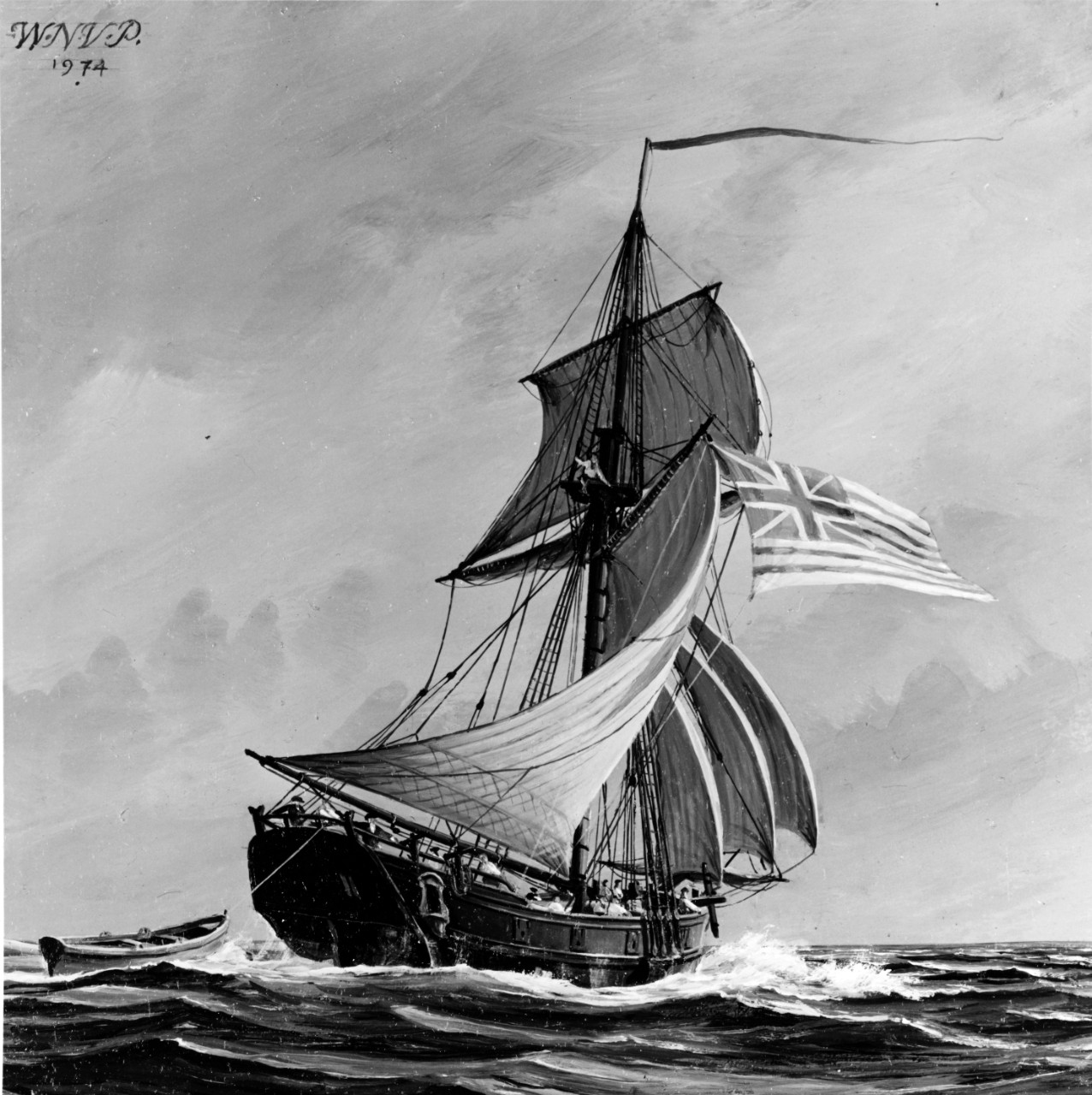
- 1974 painting of Sachem by William Nowland Van Powell

History

United States
- Name: USS Sachem
- Acquired: 2 May 1776
- Fate: Unknown.

General characteristics
- Type: Sloop-of-war
- Armament: 10 guns

Service record
- Commanders: Capt. Isaiah Robinson

USS Sachem was a 10-gun sloop of the Continental Navy which served in the American Revolutionary War.

The Continental brigantine Lexington, commanded by Captain John Barry, captured the sloop HMS Edward, a tender to British frigate HMS Liverpool, off the Delaware Capes on 7 April 1776, after a fierce, one-hour fight. Lexington escorted her prize to Philadelphia where Edward was libeled on 13 April, condemned on 29 April, and purchased by the Marine Committee of the Continental Congress on 2 May. Renamed USS Sachem, the sloop was fitted out under the direction of 17-year-old Joshua Barney who received his commission as a lieutenant while the ship was being prepared for sea. Shortly before Sachem was ready for action, Captain Isaiah Robinson assumed command of the sloop.

On 6 July, Sachem, carrying dispatches for Barry who was patrolling the mouth of the bay, dropped down the Delaware. The orders directed Barry to put to sea in Lexington. Since Barry declined the suggestion that the two ships cruise together, they parted after clearing the capes. On 12 August, Sachem fought brigantine, Three Friends, for over two hours before the British letter of marque surrendered.

Robinson sent the prize to Philadelphia for adjudication and, since Sachem had suffered substantial damage in the battle, she followed Three Friends into port for repairs.

After Sachem was back in fighting trim, she was placed under the direction of the Secret Committee which handled procurement matters for the Continental Congress. Few details of her subsequent operations have survived. It is known that she sailed for the West Indies on 29 March 1777 carrying dispatches for William Bingham, the Continental agent in Martinique. These letters were duplicates of earlier messages which had gone astray when the frigate Randolph was diverted to Charleston, South Carolina for repairs after losing two masts.

It is said that Sachem was burned in the Delaware River the following autumn to avoid capture by the British, but evidence to substantiate this claim is scant.
