= Isaiah Robinson =

American Revolutionary War Naval Captain

Isaiah Robinson (unknown – c. 1781) was a captain in the Continental Navy during the American Revolutionary War.

== Biography ==
Robinson, probably born in Philadelphia, Pennsylvania, was a member of the Philadelphia Ship Masters' Association and served as a lieutenant on the Hornet with Joshua Barney. He later commanded the 10-gun Continental sloop-of-war Sachem, fitted out by the Marine Committee shortly after Admiral Esek Hopkins' fleet sailed for New Providence in 1776, and captured a six-gun British letter of marque off the Virginia Capes.

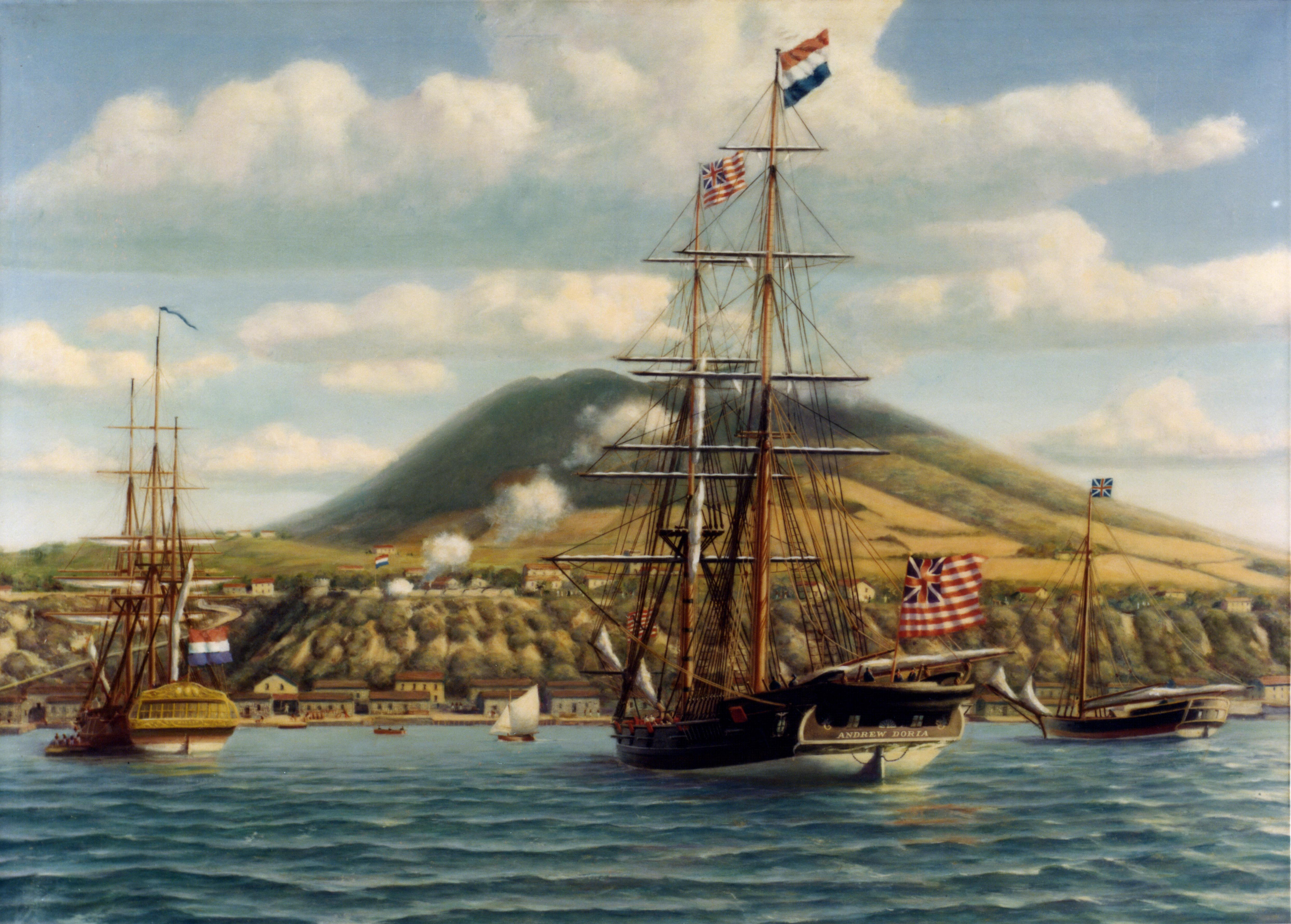
Andrew Doria receives a salute from the Dutch fort at Sint Eustatius, 16 November 1776

Appointed captain in the Continental Navy on 10 October 1776, he assumed command of the 14-gun brig Andrew Doria. One of the more important smaller boats of the Continental Navy, the brig sailed under orders of the Secret Committee, dated 17 October 1776, for the Dutch island of Sint Eustatius to take on a cargo of military stores. When the Andrew Doria entered the harbor at Sint Eustatius on 16 November, it received one of the first gun salutes rendered to the American flag).

Upon the return voyage in late November, he captured the British 12-gun sloop-of-war Racehorse after a two-hour engagement near Puerto Rico.

The following year, Captain Robinson cruised against enemy shipping off Cape May, but was finally blockaded in the Delaware River. During the defense of Philadelphia, and following the destruction of Fort Mifflin on 15 November 1777, he was forced to burn Andrew Doria to prevent the vessel from falling into enemy hands. He commanded the 12-gun Pennsylvania privateer Pomona in 1779 and succeeded in taking several British privateers.

The date of his death is unknown, but his will, dated 12 August 1777, was probated in the city of Philadelphia on 25 September 1781.

== Legacy ==
The destroyers USS Robinson (DD-88) and USS Robinson (DD-562) were named in his honor.

Robinson appears in John Edward Jennings' 1950 historical novel The Sea Eagles.
