= USS Rocky Mount =

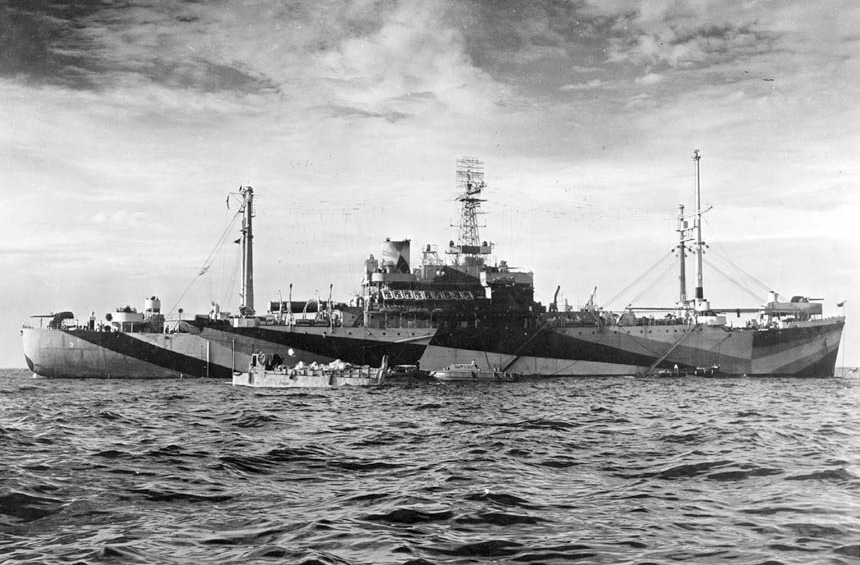

History

United States
- Name: Rocky Mount
- Namesake: Rocky Mountains
- Laid down: 4 December 1942
- Launched: 7 March 1943
- Acquired: 13 March 1943
- Commissioned: 16 October 1943
- Decommissioned: 22 March 1947
- Stricken: 1 July 1960
- Fate: Scrapped in 1973

General characteristics
- Class & type: Appalachian-class command ship
- Displacement: 7,240 t.(lt) 13.910t.(fl)
- Length: 459 ft 3 in (139.98 m)
- Beam: 63 ft (19 m)
- Draught: 24 ft (7.3 m)
- Propulsion: geared steam turbine, single propeller
- Speed: 16.4 kts.
- Complement: 31 Officers; 472 Enlisted
- Armament: two single 127mm DP gun mounts, four twin 40 mm AA gun mounts, fourteen single 20 mm AA gun mounts

USS Rocky Mount (AGC-3) was an Appalachian-class command ship in the United States Navy.

== Commissioning and 1944 ==
Rocky Mount was laid down for the Maritime Commission on 4 December 1942 by Federal Shipbuilding and Drydock Company, Kearny, New Jersey; launched 7 March 1943; sponsored by Mrs Elsie F. Lee, wife of Robert C. Lee of the Moore-McCormack Lines for whom the ship was being built; acquired by the Navy 13 March 1943; and after conversion by Bethlehem Steel Co., Hoboken, N.J., commissioned 15 October 1943.

Following shakedown, Rocky Mount sailed for Hawaii via the Panama Canal arriving at Pearl Harbor 27 December. On 10 January 1944, she became flagship of Rear Admiral Richmond K. Turner, Commander, 5th Amphibious Force, Pacific Fleet.

Rocky Mount was the 3rd of a new type of naval auxiliary: a specially-equipped command and communications ship, which had been improvised for Admiral H. Kent Hewitt in the Salerno operation. The increasing complexity of communications in modern amphibious warfare and the larger number of officers and enlisted men necessary to staff amphibious force headquarters, necessitated the new type.

== 1944-1945 ==
On 22 January, the 5th Amphibious Force got underway for the Marshall Islands and arrived off Kwajalein the 31st. This was the first of six important campaigns in which Rocky Mount played a significant role. Rear Admiral Turner directed operations from his flagship until Kwajalein was secured on 4 February.

Rocky Mount then became flagship for the task group which next took Eniwetok. On the 25th, she departed the Marshalls for Pearl Harbor and overhaul.

Vice Admiral Turner, now Commander of Amphibious Forces, Pacific, boarded Rocky Mount again, along with Lt. Gen. Holland Smith, USMC, Commander, 5th Amphibious Corps. The ship got underway 29 May as flagship for the "Joint Expeditionary Force" attacking the Marianas Islands. On 15 June she reached Saipan and directed initial landings which came under heavy mortar and rifle fire and air attack. After 24 days, organized resistance on the island ceased. Rocky Mount proceeded to Guam 20 July, and 4 days later sailed for Tinian.

Rear Adm. Forrest B. Royal broke his flag on board Rocky Mount in Pearl Harbor on 26 August. On 15 September she departed for Manus, and 1 month later sortied for the assault on Leyte, Philippine Islands, as flagship of the Amphibious Force Fleet. From 21 to 24 October she participated in shore bombardment, temporarily silencing enemy mortar fire which had damaged several beached LSTs. The ship then sailed for practice and drills in the Admiralty Islands and New Guinea.

Rocky Mount returned to the Philippines to participate in the Lingayen Gulf operation as flagship of Attack Group "Baker", 6 January 1945. The amphibious group was under frequent air attack from the enemy-held island of Luzon. For 5 weeks Rocky Mount acted as flagship, Lingayen Area Control Group. On 8 March she carried Lt. Gen. R. L. Eichelberger, Brig. Gen. White, and Maj. Gen. J. A. Dow and their staff to Santa Cruz Bank for landings on Zamboanga Peninsula, Mindanao. This ship observed and directed the assault for 2 weeks following her arrival on the 10th.

While anchored in Subic Bay, Rocky Mount welcomed Brigadier Lindley Barham, Australian Army (AA), 4 April, and departed for Morotai where all hands attended memorial services for the late President Franklin D. Roosevelt. On the 23d, Brigadier D. A. Whitehead, AA, and his staff embarked and Rocky Mount got underway for landings on Tarakan Island, Borneo. Maj. Gen. George Wootten, AA, came on board at Morotai on 3 May, and the ship began its second part of the Borneo Campaign - the assault from Brunei Bay. After naval shore bombardment 10 June, Rocky Mount landed troops, and 1 week later she was underway for Leyte. En route Rear Admiral Royal died from a heart attack 18 June.

Ten days after Japan surrendered, Rocky Mount reported to Commander, 7th Fleet, as his flagship. She embarked part of his staff at Manila 1 September, and then sailed for Jinsen, Korea, where, on the 10th, Admiral Thomas C. Kinkaid came on board and broke his flag. The next day the ship was underway across the Yellow Sea to the Yangtze River Patrol.

She led U.S. and Allied ships up the Yangtze and Huangpu Rivers the 19th, and returned to Shanghai where they were met by cheering crowds along the shores.

== Post-war and decommissioning ==
From the day she arrived at Pearl Harbor, 27 December 1943, the ship never left the combat area of the Pacific and came through all of the operations unscathed. She was dubbed "The Rock" and "Veteran Queen of Amphibious Fleets". She decommissioned and was placed in reserve with the San Francisco Group, Pacific Fleet, on 22 March 1947. She remained in this status until struck from the Navy List 1 July 1960.

For her service during World War II, Rocky Mount earned six battle stars, and the Navy Unit Commendation.
