= USS Forrest Royal =

Gearing-class destroyer

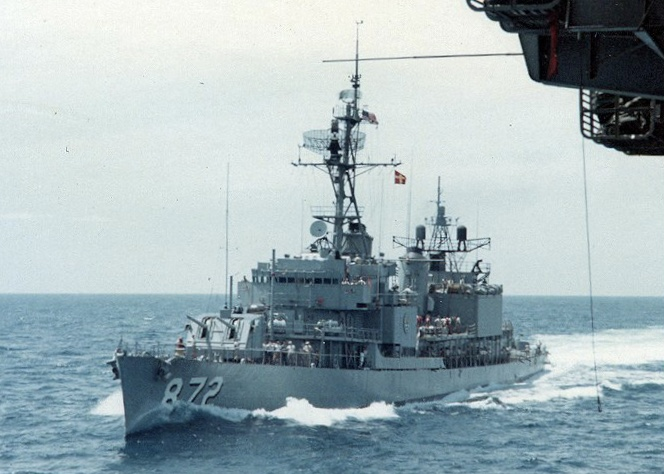
- USS Forrest Royal in April 1967

History

United States
- Name: USS Forrest Royal
- Namesake: Forrest Beton Royal
- Builder: Bethlehem Mariners Harbor, Staten Island, New York
- Laid down: 8 June 1945
- Launched: 17 January 1946
- Commissioned: 29 June 1946
- Decommissioned: 27 March 1971
- Stricken: 1 February 1973
- Identification: Callsign: NBHE; Hull number: DD-872
- Motto: Praemunitas Praemonitas (Forewarned is Forearmed)
- Fate: Sold to the Turkish Navy for $153,000 in 1971.

Turkey
- Name: Adatepe
- Acquired: 1971
- Commissioned: 17 December 1971
- Decommissioned: 6 August 1993
- Identification: D 353
- Fate: Scrapped 1993

General characteristics
- Class & type: Gearing-class destroyer
- Displacement: 3,460 tons (full)
- Length: 390 ft 6 in (119.0 m) (overall)
- Beam: 40.1 ft (12.2 m)
- Draft: 14.4 ft (4.4 m) (max)
- Propulsion: 2 × geared turbines; 2 × propellers
- Speed: 35 kn (65 km/h; 40 mph)
- Range: 4,500 nmi (8,300 km; 5,200 mi) at 20 kn (37 km/h; 23 mph)
- Complement: 336
- Armament: 6 × 5 in (127 mm)/38 caliber guns; 12 × 40 mm (1.6 in) Bofors AA guns; 11 × 20 mm (0.79 in) Oerlikon AA cannons; 10 × 21 in (533 mm) torpedo tubes; 6 × depth charge projectors; 2 × depth charge tracks

USS Forrest Royal (DD-872) was a United States Navy Gearing-class destroyer constructed following the end of World War II. The ship saw service in the Korean War and the Vietnam War before being sold to Turkey in 1971. The ship was renamed TCG Adatepe and remained in service until being scrapped in 1993.

Forrest Royal, named for Rear Admiral Forrest Beton Royal USN (1893–1945), was laid down by the Bethlehem Steel Corporation at Staten Island, New York on 8 June 1945. The ship was launched on 17 January 1946 by Miss Katherine K. Royal, the daughter of Admiral Royal and commissioned on 29 June 1946.

Forrest Royal operated with the 7th Fleet in support of United Nations Forces during the Korean War then alternated operations along the east coast and in the Caribbean with the 2nd Fleet with deployments to the Mediterranean with the 6th Fleet.

== Service history ==
=== 1946–1960 ===
Forrest Royal's operations in the period prior to the Korean War illustrated the varied capability of the modern destroyer, and the wide range of missions which such ships are assigned. She conducted special tests for the Bureau of Ships in the Caribbean, served as plane guard and escort for aircraft carriers, took part in the development of antisubmarine warfare and fired in shore bombardment exercises. Usually based at Pensacola, she visited many ports in the Caribbean and Gulf of Mexico.

On 26 September 1950, Forrest Royal sailed from Guantanamo Bay for duty in the Korean War, arriving at Sasebo 27 October. Her first assignment was as flagship for the minesweeping at Chinnampo, a port essential to supply operations for the 8th Army. The destroyer's other activities included shore bombardment, blockade, and escort all around the Korean coast, and extensive operations with carrier task forces conducting air strikes. She sailed for home 6 June 1951, returning to Norfolk 2 July.

Forrest Royal received four battle stars for Korean War service.

Forrest Royal's next deployment, between 26 August 1952 and 29 January 1953, was for a combination of NATO exercises off the coast of Norway, visits to principal ports in northern Europe, 2 months with the U.S. 6th Fleet in the Mediterranean, and antisubmarine exercises with British ships off Northern Ireland. Through the next year and a half, the destroyer sailed out of Newport, Rhode Island, for exercises along the Atlantic coast and in the Caribbean, often serving with carriers out of Pensacola, Florida.

During a cruise around the world between 2 August 1954 and 14 March 1955, Forrest Royal sailed westward to serve with the U.S. 7th Fleet in Japanese and Philippine waters, thence onward to the Indian Ocean and the Suez Canal to join the 6th Fleet in the Mediterranean, returning across the Atlantic to Newport. She made her next visit to the Mediterranean between 14 September 1956 and 3 April 1957, and during the Suez Crisis, patrolled along the Egyptian and Levant coasts. Assigned to service in the Persian Gulf, Red Sea, and Gulf of Suez, Forrest Royal made the long voyage around the African continent for this duty, since the Suez Canal was still blocked.

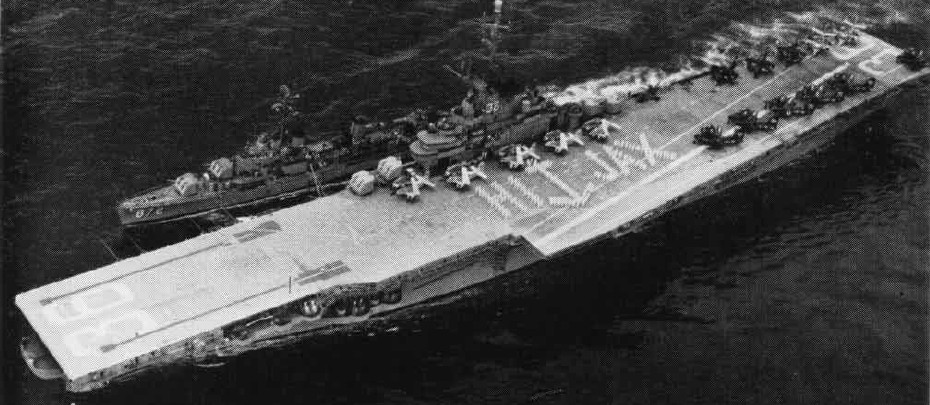
USS Forrest Royal being refueled by USS Antietam (CV-36), 1957.

Forrest Royal took part in a midshipman cruise to South America in the summer of 1957 as well as the International Naval Review in Hampton Roads on 12 June 1957. NATO operations took her to European waters once more that fall, and on 11 July 1958, she sailed from Newport for Morehead City, North Carolina, where amphibious ships of her force embarked Marines for landing exercises at Puerto Rico. This task force cleared San Juan 1 August to land the marines at Beirut, Lebanon, 20 to 28 August, reinforcing the troops earlier landed in the Navy's immediate response to the outbreak of Middle Eastern trouble. Forrest Royal sailed on through the Suez Canal to bring her additional strength to the 7th Fleet as it intensified its activities in the Taiwan Straits in response to renewed Communist shelling of Quemoy and Matsu through September. Her homeward bound passage was by way of Cape Town, South Africa, and she returned to Newport 18 November.

A highlight of Forrest Royal's operating schedule in 1959 was her participation in Operation Inland Seas, the movement of a major naval task force into the Great Lakes in connection with the ceremonial opening of the St. Lawrence Seaway. She joined in the naval review on Lake Saint-Louis 26 June taken by President Dwight D. Eisenhower and Queen Elizabeth II of Great Britain, and called at United States and Canadian ports to greet thousands of visitors. In March 1960, she sailed once more to the Mediterranean to serve with the 6th Fleet and added a brief tour with the Middle East Force prior to her return to the States in October. She operated out of Newport for the remainder of the year.

=== 1961–1971 ===
From 24 October to 21 November 1962, Forrest Royal was among the US naval vessels deployed during the Cuban Missile Crisis.

In May 1967 as part of Task Force 77, Forrest Royal took part in Operation Sea Dragon. Although air power was the cutting edge of Task Force 77, surface ships were essential to the interdiction campaign in North Vietnam and Laos. In Operation Sea Dragon, begun in October 1966, cruisers, destroyers, and for one month battleship USS New Jersey ranged the North Vietnamese littoral sinking Communist supply craft, shelling coastal batteries and radar sites, and complementing the aerial interdiction effort by bombarding the infiltration routes ashore. While at first restricted to coastal waters south of 17°31'N, by February 1967 the Sea Dragon force was authorized to operate as far north as the 20th parallel. This area was constricted in April 1968 when the bombing halt ended American combat activity north of the 19th parallel.

Steaming generally in pairs, the two to four American and Australian destroyers and one cruiser worked with carrier-based spotter planes, such as the A-l Skyraider and Grumman S-2 Tracker, to find, identify, and destroy infiltrating vessels and shore targets. Often, North Vietnamese coastal batteries fired back. Although several of the 19 ships that were hit required repairs at shipyards in Japan and the Philippines, no vessel was sunk during the two-year-long Sea Dragon operation. Damaged ships were quickly replaced on the gun line and the coastal deployment was maintained. Periodically, this group reinforced the Seventh Fleet cruisers and destroyers providing naval gunfire support to allied forces in South Vietnam. The naval surface group conducted the Sea Dragon effort until the end of October 1968, when American combat operations in North Vietnam ceased. She accompanied dd-763 on Indian Ocean cruise Nov 1969 returning in May 1970.

=== TCG Adatepe (D 353) ===
USS Forrest Royal was decommissioned on 27 March 1971, transferred to the Turkish Navy and renamed TCG Adatepe (D 353). She was stricken from the United States Naval Vessel Register on 1 February 1973. Adatepe was seriously damaged in error by Turkish aircraft on 22 July 1974, mistaking it for a Greek vessel during Turkish invasion of Cyprus on Cyprus. The ship was repaired and continued in service with the Turkish Navy until being scrapped in 1993.
