= Soviet ship Kosmonavt Yuriy Gagarin =

Spacecraft tracking ship of the Soviet Union

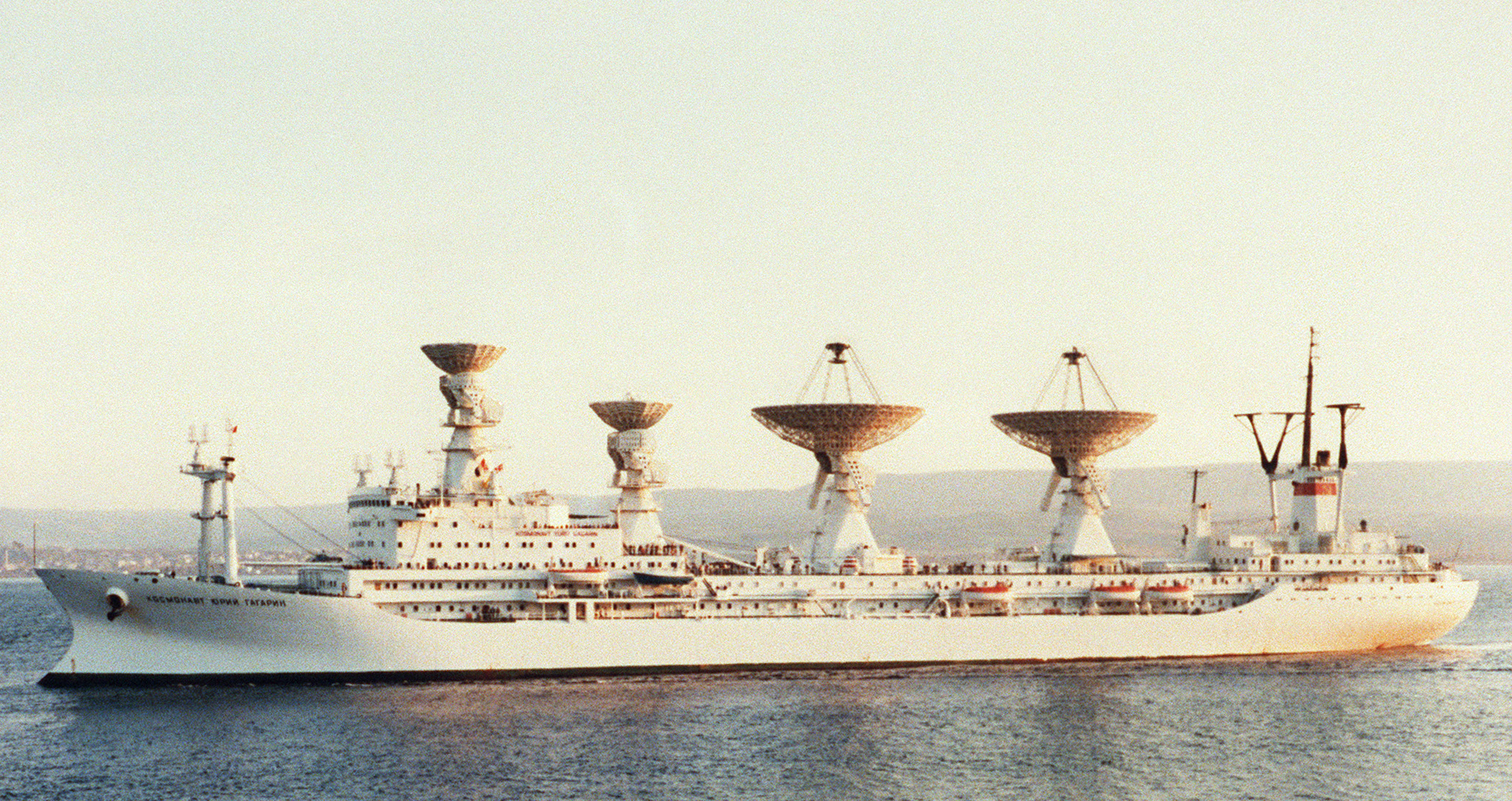
- Kosmonavt Yuriy Gagarin in 1987

History

Soviet Union
- Name: Kosmonavt Yuriy Gagarin
- Operator: 1971–1992: Soviet Academy of Sciences
- Port of registry: Odesa, Soviet Union
- Builder: Baltic Shipyard, Leningrad
- Yard number: 601
- Acquired: September 1971
- Identification: Call sign: UKFI; IMO number: 7116286
- Fate: Transferred to Ukraine, 1992

Ukraine
- Name: 1971–1996: Kosmonavt Yuriy Gagarin; 1996: Agar
- Port of registry: 1992–1996: Odesa, Ukraine; 1996: Kingstown, Saint Vincent and the Grenadines
- Acquired: 1992
- Fate: Scrapped in Alang, August 1996

Class overview
- Name: Sofiya (Modified) (Soviet Project 1909)
- Builders: Baltic Shipyard, Leningrad
- Operators: Academy of Sciences
- Built: 1971
- In service: 1971–1991
- Completed: 1
- Retired: 1

General characteristics of Kosmonavt Yuriy Gagarin
- Type: SESS / Vigilship (Veladora)
- Tonnage: 31,300 DWT
- Displacement: 53,500 tons standard
- Length: 760 ft (230 m)
- Beam: 102 ft (31 m)
- Draft: 33 ft (10 m)
- Propulsion: 2 steam turbines (Kirov) with electric drive; 19,000 shp (14,000 kW), 1 shaft
- Speed: 17.7 knots (33 km/h)
- Range: 24,000 nmi (44,448 km) at 17.7 knots (33 km/h)
- Complement: approx. 160 + 180 scientist-technicians
- Sensors & processing systems: 1 Don-Kay and 1 Okean (Navigation); Tracking and communications equipment includes Quad Ring, Ship Bowl, and Ship Globe. Two pairs of Vee Tube/Cone HF antennas.
- Aircraft carried: none
- Aviation facilities: none

Kosmonavt Yuriy Gagarin (Russian: «Космона́вт Ю́рий Гага́рин») was a Soviet space control-monitoring ship that was devoted to detecting and receiving satellite communications. Named after cosmonaut Yuri Gagarin, the ship was completed in December 1971 to support the Soviet space program. The ship also conducted upper atmosphere and outer space research.

It had very distinguishable looks due to two extremely large and two smaller parabolic "dish" antennas placed on top of the hull.

In 1986, Kosmonavt Yuriy Gagarin was the world's largest communications ship and was the flagship of a fleet of communications ships. These ships greatly extended the tracking range when the orbits of cosmonauts and unmanned missions were not over the USSR.

In 1975, the ship was a part of the Soviet-American Apollo–Soyuz joint test program.

The communications ships belonged to the Soviet Academy of Sciences. The maritime part fell under the responsibility of the Baltic and Black Sea shipping. The ships had home ports in Ukraine (Kosmonavt Yuriy Gagarin and the other surveillance ship Akademik Sergei Korolev), so after the fall of the Soviet Union they were transferred to Ukraine – ending their role in spaceflight.

The ship was sold for scrap in Alang, India in August 1996, along with Akademik Sergei Korolev.

== See also ==
- Kosmonavt Vladimir Komarov, another Soviet satellite tracking ship
- List of ships of Russia by project number
