= Soviet ship Akademik Sergey Korolyov =

Spacecraft tracking ship of the Soviet Union

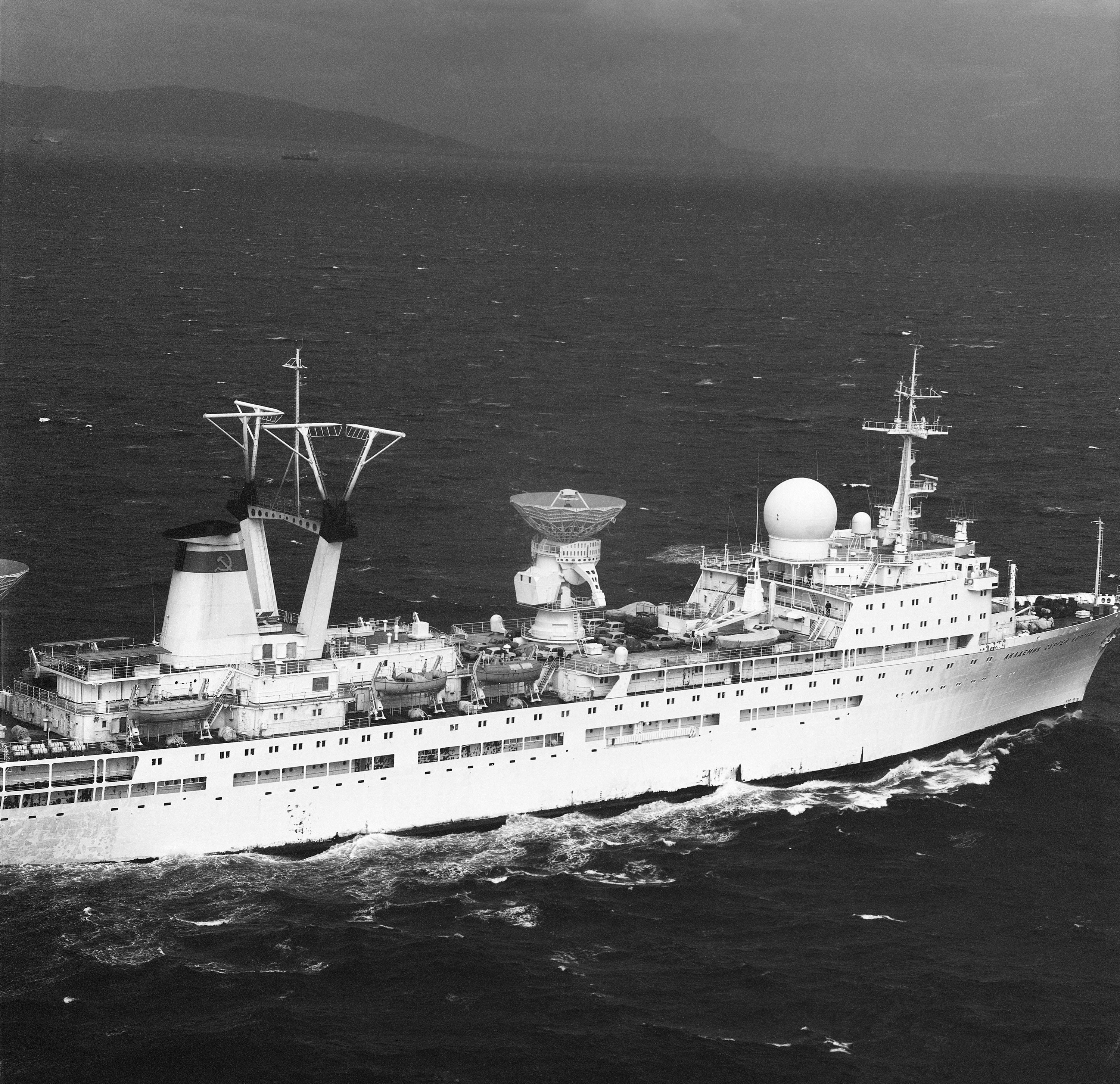
- A starboard quarter view of the Soviet Korolyov class civilian space associated ship Akademik Sergey Korolyov underway. (1/1/1988)

History

Soviet Union
- Name: 1970–1996: Akademik Sergey Korolyov; 1996: Orol
- Owner: Black Sea Shipping; 1996: Polluks Shipping
- Operator: Academy of Sciences; 1996: Four Seasons Shipmanagement
- Port of registry: 1970–1992: Odesa, Soviet Union; 1992–1996: Odesa, Ukraine; 1996: Kingstown, Saint Vincent and the Grenadines
- Builder: Black Sea Shipyard, Nikolayev
- Yard number: 209/704
- Completed: December 1970
- Identification: Call sign: UISZ → J8QS6; IMO number: 7052284
- Fate: Scrapped in Alang, August 1996

Class overview
- Name: Korolyov (Soviet Project 1908)
- Builders: Black Sea Shipyard, Nikolayev
- Operators: Academy of Sciences
- Completed: 1
- Retired: 1

General characteristics Akademik Sergey Korolyov
- Type: SESS / Vigilship (Veladora)
- Tonnage: 7,067 DWT
- Displacement: 17,115 tons standard, 21,250 tons full load
- Length: 596 ft (182 m)
- Beam: 82 ft (25 m)
- Draft: 26 ft (7.9 m)
- Propulsion: 1 diesel (Bryansk/Burmeister & Wain); 12,000 hp (8,900 kW), 1 shaft
- Speed: 17.5 knots (32 km/h)
- Range: 22,500 nmi (41,670 km) at 16 knots (30 km/h)
- Complement: approx. 190 + 170 scientist-technicians
- Sensors & processing systems: 2 Don-Kay (Navigation); Tracking and communications equipment includes Quad Ring, Ship Bowl, Ship Globe, and Vee Tube antennas.

The Akademik Sergey Korolyov (Russian: Академик Сергей Королёв) was a space control-monitoring ship constructed in 1970 to support the Soviet space program. Named after Sergey Korolyov, the ship also conducted upper atmosphere and outer space research.

The Akademik Sergey Korolyov was a part of a fleet of communications ships. These ships greatly extended the tracking range when the orbits of cosmonauts and unmanned missions were not within range of Soviet land-based tracking stations. The ship mainly operated in the Atlantic Ocean monitoring spacecraft trajectory and telemetry data as well as guaranteeing a communications link with the cosmonauts.

The ship had about 1200 accommodations, including 79 laboratories, in which 188 scientific workers performed their duties.

In 1975, the ship was a part of the Soviet-American Apollo–Soyuz joint test program.

The ship was also utilized in a joint US and Soviet research project studying links between the ocean and various atmospheric gasses.

The ship was sold for scrapping and renamed OROL, arriving at Alang on 18 August 1996.

== See also ==
- Kosmonavt Yuriy Gagarin, another Soviet satellite tracking ship
- Kosmonavt Vladimir Komarov, another Soviet satellite tracking ship
- List of ships of Russia by project number
