= Soviet ship Kosmonavt Vladimir Komarov =

Spacecraft tracking ship of the Soviet Union

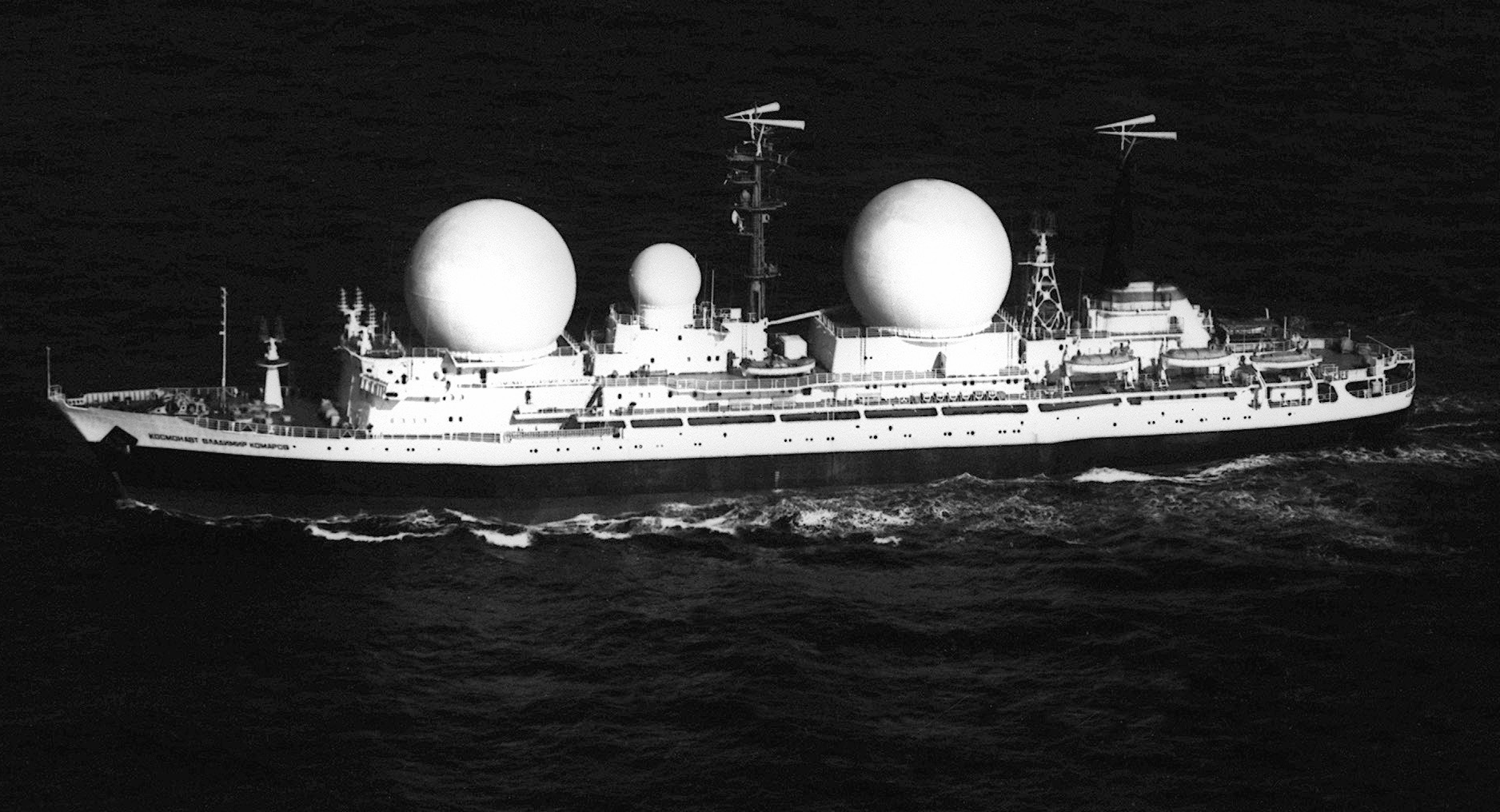

Class overview
- Built: 1966
- In service: 1967-1989
- Completed: 1
- Retired: 1

History

Soviet Union
- Name: 1966-1967: Genichesk; 1967-1989 Kosmonavt Vladimir Komarov
- Completed: 1966
- Decommissioned: 1989
- Identification: IMO number: 6707404
- Fate: Scrapped

General characteristics
- Displacement: 17,850 t
- Length: 155.7 m
- Beam: 23.3 m
- Draught: 8.8 m
- Propulsion: 1 x Bryansk BMZ Diesel
- Speed: 17 kn
- Crew: 240

Kosmonavt Vladimir Komarov was a satellite tracking ship of the Soviet Union.

It was named after Vladimir Mikhaylovich Komarov, the cosmonaut who died on Soyuz 1.

It was built as an ordinary cargo ship in 1966 and converted in Leningrad in 1967.

It was decommissioned in 1989.

== See also ==
- Akademik Sergey Korolev, another Soviet satellite tracking ship
- Kosmonavt Yuriy Gagarin, another Soviet satellite tracking ship
