= Forrest B. Royal =

United States Navy admiral

Forrest Beton Royal
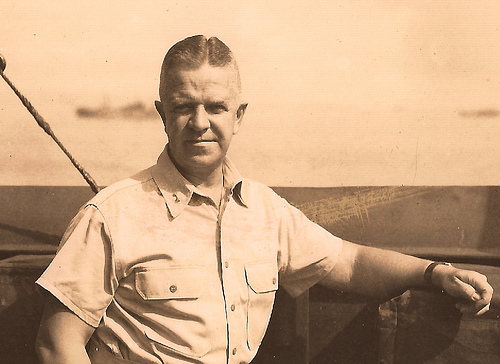
- Rear Admiral Forrest B. Royal on the bridge of his flagship USS Rocky Mount, January 1945.
- Born: February 10, 1893; New York City, US
- Died: June 18, 1945 (aged 52); Vicinity of Borneo
- Military career
- Allegiance: United States of America
- Branch: United States Navy
- Service years: 1915–45
- Rank: Rear Admiral
- Commands: Amphibious Group Six
- Conflicts: Philippines Campaign (1944–45)
- Awards: Distinguished Service Medal (2)

Forrest Beton Royal (February 10, 1893 – June 18, 1945) was a United States Navy rear admiral.

== Biography ==
Royal was a member of the United States Naval Academy class of 1915. Service in increasingly important posts afloat and ashore prepared him for his role as commander of Amphibious Group 6 in the assaults on Leyte, Luzon, Mindanao, and Borneo during the Pacific War in 1944 and 1945. His planning and execution of these important assignments was recognized with the Distinguished Service Medal, and the posthumous (he had died of a heart attack on board his flagship USS Rocky Mount) award of a Gold Star in lieu of a second Distinguished Service Medal. He was also appointed posthumously Honorary Commander of the Order of the British Empire for his service for the allied cause.

== Namesake ==
In 1946 the destroyer USS Forrest Royal was named after RADM Royal, sponsored by his daughter, Miss Katharine K. Royal.
