= Command ship =

Flagships of the commander of a fleet

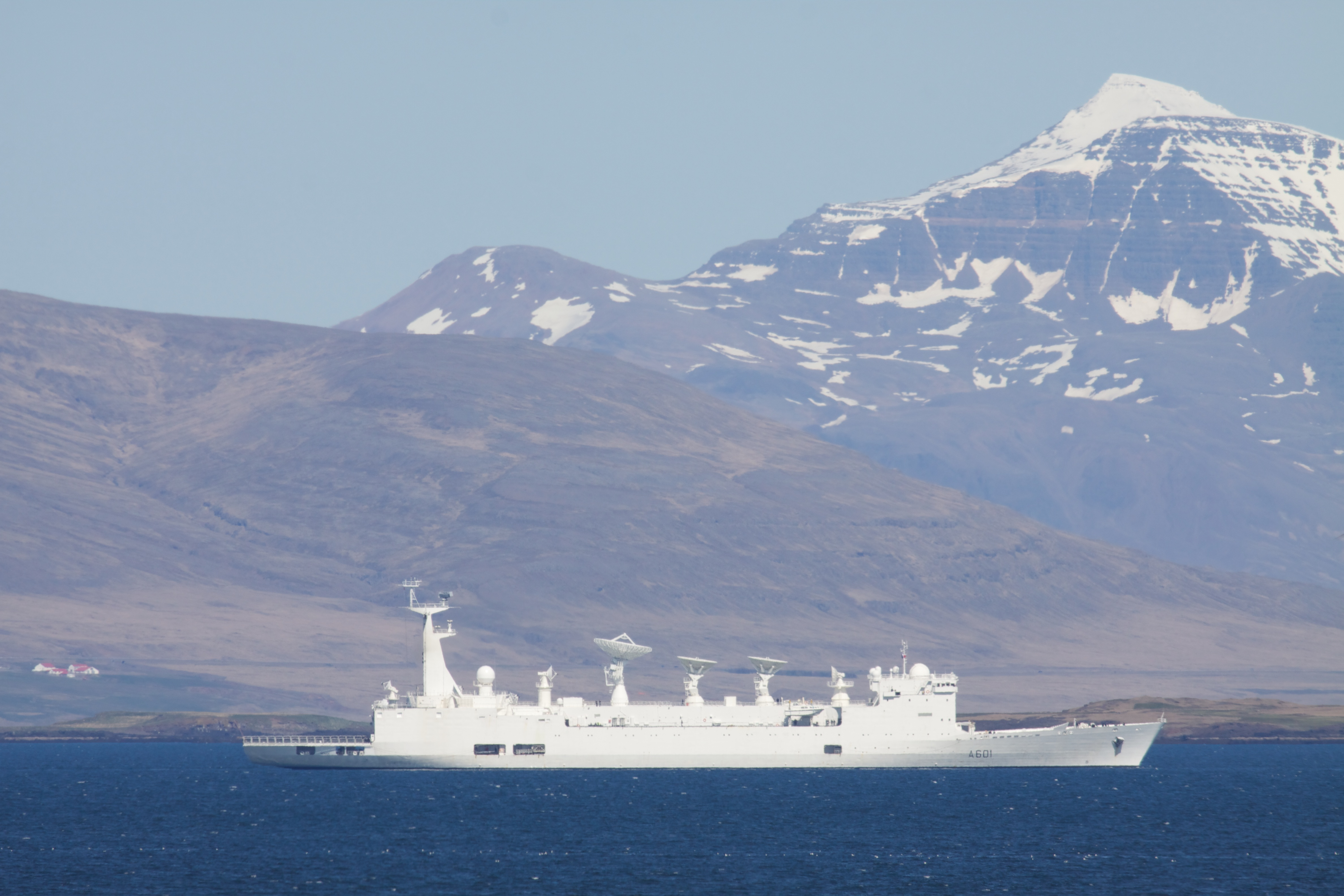
Monge, a missile range instrumentation ship of the French Navy.

Command ships serve as the flagships of the commander of a fleet. They provide communications, office space, and accommodations for a fleet commander and their staff, and serve to coordinate fleet activities.

An auxiliary command ship features the command and control components prevalent on landing ships (command) and also features the capability to land troops and equipment. These forces will be slightly less than those on a pure landing ship due to the nature of the ship as a command vessel and hence will also house the assault commander, the flotilla commander or someone of similar status (generally of NATO OF-7 or OF-8 rank—such as a major general or vice admiral).

Currently, the United States Navy operates two command ships, USS Blue Ridge and USS Mount Whitney, both of the purpose-built Blue Ridge class. Two command ships, USS La Salle and USS Coronado were converted from Landing Platform Docks (LPD); these ships were decommissioned in March 2005 and December 2006 and sunk as targets in support of a fleet training exercise on 11 April 2007 and as part of live-fire exercise Valiant Shield 2012, respectively.

The Soviet Union operated several space program command ships, Akademik Sergey Korolev, Kosmonavt Vladimir Komarov, Kosmonavt Yuri Gagarin, and the Soviet communications ship SSV-33 Ural. These ships greatly extended the tracking range when the orbits of cosmonauts and uncrewed missions were not within range of Soviet land-based tracking stations. Similar U.S. vessels were classified as Missile Range Instrumentation Ships (T-AGM).

== See also ==
- Amphibious command ships
  - List of United States Navy amphibious warfare ships § Amphibious Force Flagship (AGC)
  - List of United States Navy amphibious warfare ships § Amphibious Command Ship (LCC)
- Auxiliary command ships
  - List of auxiliaries of the United States Navy § Command Ships (AGF)
- Command cruisers
  - List of cruisers of the United States Navy § Command cruisers (CLC, CC)
  - National Emergency Command Post Afloat
  - Radar Picket § Northampton Command Cruiser
- Space tracking or command ships
  - List of auxiliaries of the United States Navy § Missile Range Instrumentation Ships (T-AGM)
- World War II construction battalion (Seebee) and Service Squadron command ships
  - USS Argonne - Service Squadron mobile base command ship, ex-fleet flagship
  - USS Cascade - Service Squadron mobile base command ship
  - USS City of Dalhart - Seebee command ship
  - USS Ocelot - Service Squadron mobile base command ship
  - USS Wright/ USS San Clemente - Service Squadron mobile base command ship
- Absalon-class support ship
- De Zeven Provinciën-class frigate
