= SS Stag Hound =

SS or MS Stag Hound or Staghound may refer to:

- SS Stag Hound (1939), a Type C2 ship built at Newport News Shipbuilding; became United States Navy stores ship USS Aldebaran (AF-10) in 1940; broken up in 1974
- MS Stag Hound (1941), a Type C2-SU-R ship built at Sun Shipbuilding; sunk on 3 March 1943 by Barbarigo
- SS Stag Hound (1945), a Type C2-S-AJ1 ship built at North Carolina Shipbuilding; operated under a variety of other names from 1948 to 1971; broken up in 1971
