= SS Mormactern =

Two ships of Moore-McCormack have borne the name Mormactern

- SS Mormactern was launched in 1939 as a Type C2 ship under the name Lightning. She was renamed Mormactern in 1940 and acquired by the US Navy in 1941 as a cargo ship and renamed USS Mercury. She was decommissioned in 1946 and transferred to the National Defense Reserve Fleet in 1959. She was scrapped in 1975.
- SS Mormactern was launched in 1943 as a Type C1-B ship. She was transferred to the National Defense Reserve Fleet in 1959 and was scuttled in 1968.
