= Type C2 ship =

Ship type

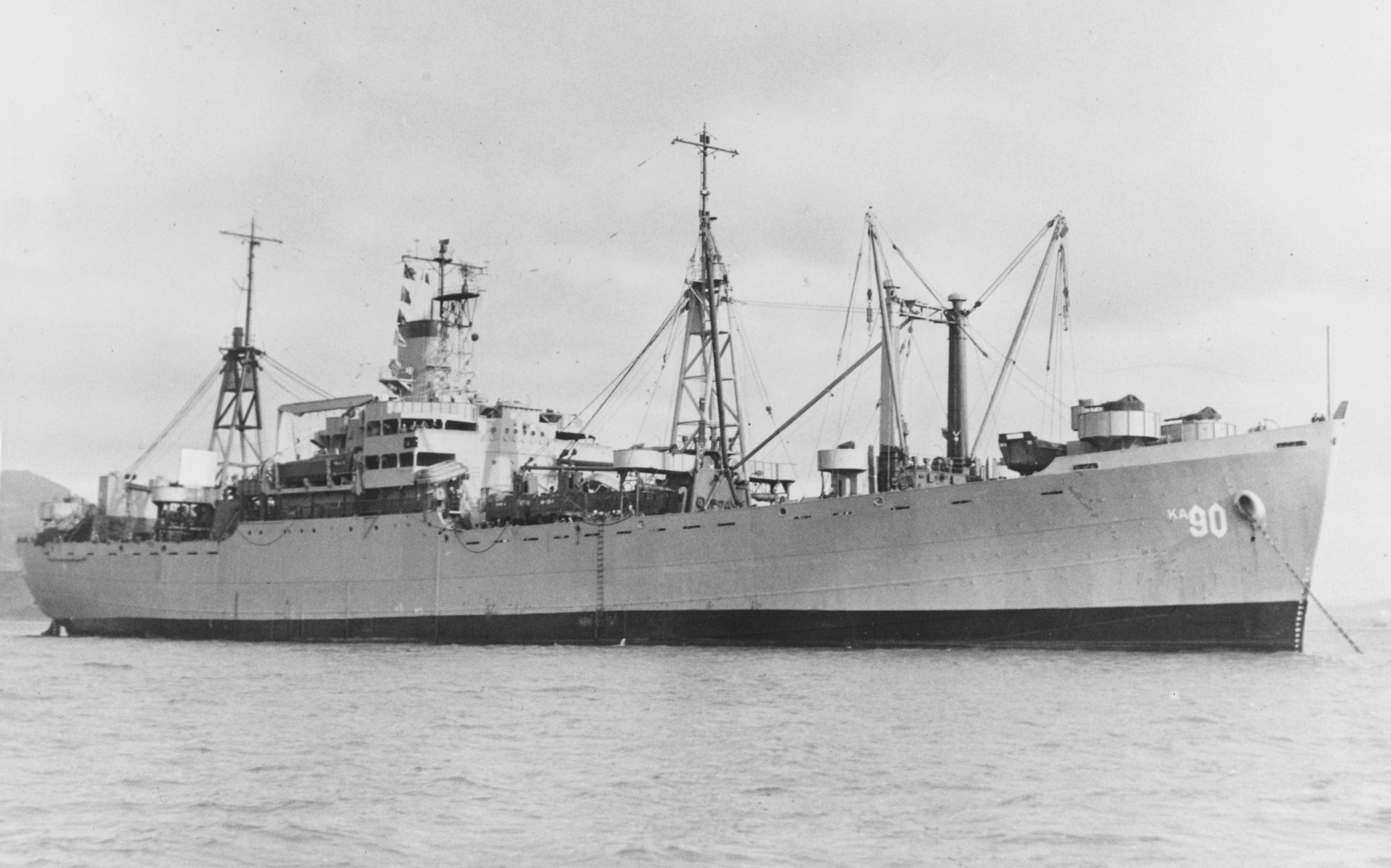
- USS Whiteside anchored in San Francisco Bay, circa 1948, a Type C2-S-B1 ship

Class overview
- Name: Type C2 ship
- Builders: Sun Yards; Western Pipe & Steel; Federal Shipbuilding; Moore Drydock; Consolidated Steel Corporation
- Subclasses: Aldebaran-class
- Cost: $3,380,400 (1945); $48,136,896 (2020)
- Built: 1938–1946 (U.S. shipyards)
- In service: 1938 – c. 1970
- In commission: 4 April 1941 (AF-11)
- Completed: 328 (23 July 1938 – TBD)
- Lost: 8 during hostilities

General characteristics
- Type: Cargo ship
- Tonnage: 5,443 DWT (AF-11)
- Displacement: 13,910 tons (AF-11)
- Length: 459 ft 0 in (139.90 m) (design)
- Beam: 63 ft 0 in (19.20 m) (design)
- Draft: 25 ft 0 in (7.62 m) (design)
- Depth: 40 ft 0 in (12.19 m) (design)
- Propulsion: two boilers, two turbines single propeller 6,000 shp (4,500 kW) (AF-11) or; diesel engines
- Speed: 15.5 knots (28.7 km/h) (design); 19 knots (35 km/h) (maximum)
- Complement: 287 (AF-11)
- Armament: 1 × single 5 in (130 mm) dual-purpose gun mount; 4 × single 3 in (76 mm) dual-purpose gun mounts; 10 × single 20 mm AA gun mounts (AF-11)

Type C2 ships were designed by the United States Maritime Commission (MARCOM) in 1937–38. They were all-purpose cargo ships with five holds, and U.S. shipyards built 328 of them from 1939 to 1945. Compared to ships built before 1939, the C2s were remarkable for their speed and fuel economy. Their design speed was 15.5 knots (28.7 km/h), but some could make 19 knots (35 km/h) on occasion. The first C2s were 459 feet (140 m) long, 63 feet (19 m) broad, and 40 feet (12 m) deep, with a 25-foot (8 m) draft. Later ships varied somewhat in size. Some, intended for specific trade routes, were built with significant modifications in length and capacity.

In 1937, MARCOM distributed tentative designs for criticism by shipbuilders, ship owners, and naval architects. The final designs incorporated many changes suggested by these constituencies. The ships were to be reasonably fast but economical cargo ships which, with some government subsidies to operators, could compete with vessels of other nations. Building costs were to be minimized by standardization of design and equipment, and the ships were to have sufficient speed and stability that they could be used as naval auxiliaries in time of national emergency.

The basic specifications called for a five-hold steel cargo ship with raked stem and cruiser stern, complete shelter and second decks, and a third deck in Nos. 1–4 holds. Dimensions of the hatches were 20 ft × 30 ft (6 m × 9 m), except for No. 2, which was 20 ft × 50 ft (6 m × 15 m), allowing such cargo as locomotives, naval guns, long bars, etc. Ventilation to the holds was provided by hollow kingposts, which also served as cargo masts. Cargo handling gear consisted of fourteen 5-ton cargo booms, plus two 30-ton booms at Nos. 3 and 4 hatches.

Living accommodations were much improved over previous designs, with crew accommodations amidships, officers quarters on the boat deck, and the captain's quarters on the bridge deck, along with the wheelhouse, chartroom, gyro and radio room. Hot and cold running water was provided throughout.

Many of the ships such as SS Donald McKay were converted by the U.S. Navy for service during World War II. The commercial versions were operated by the government during the war. Beginning in late 1945, the commercial ships were sold to merchant shipping lines, with service until the early 1970s.

== Cost ==
According to the War Production Board, in 1943 the C-2 had a relative cost of $313 per deadweight ton (10,800 deadweight tonnage) for $3,380,400; which at $14 to $1 inflation of 1945 to 2020 amounts to $48,136,896

== Ships in class ==
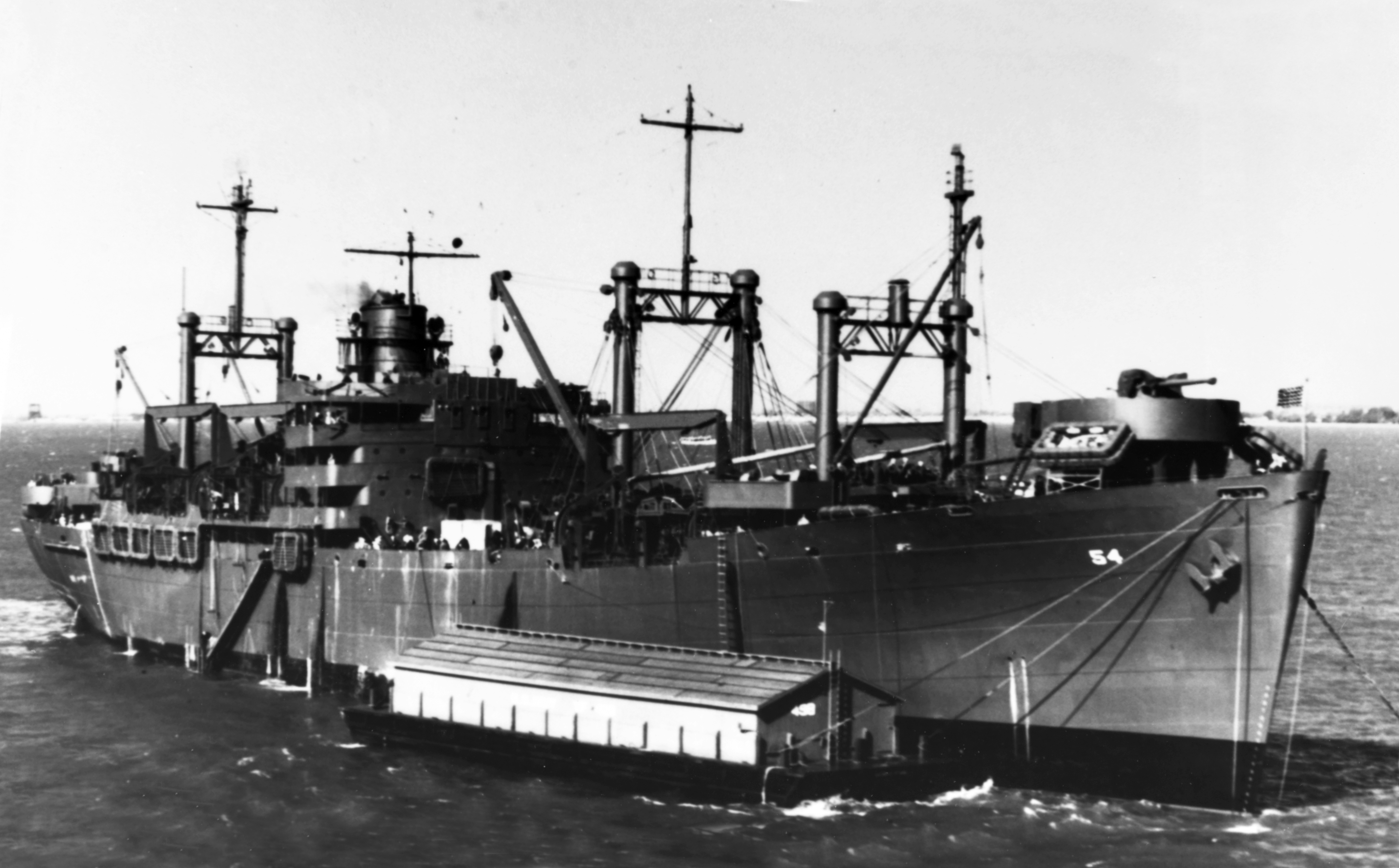
USS Wayne, a C2-S-E1

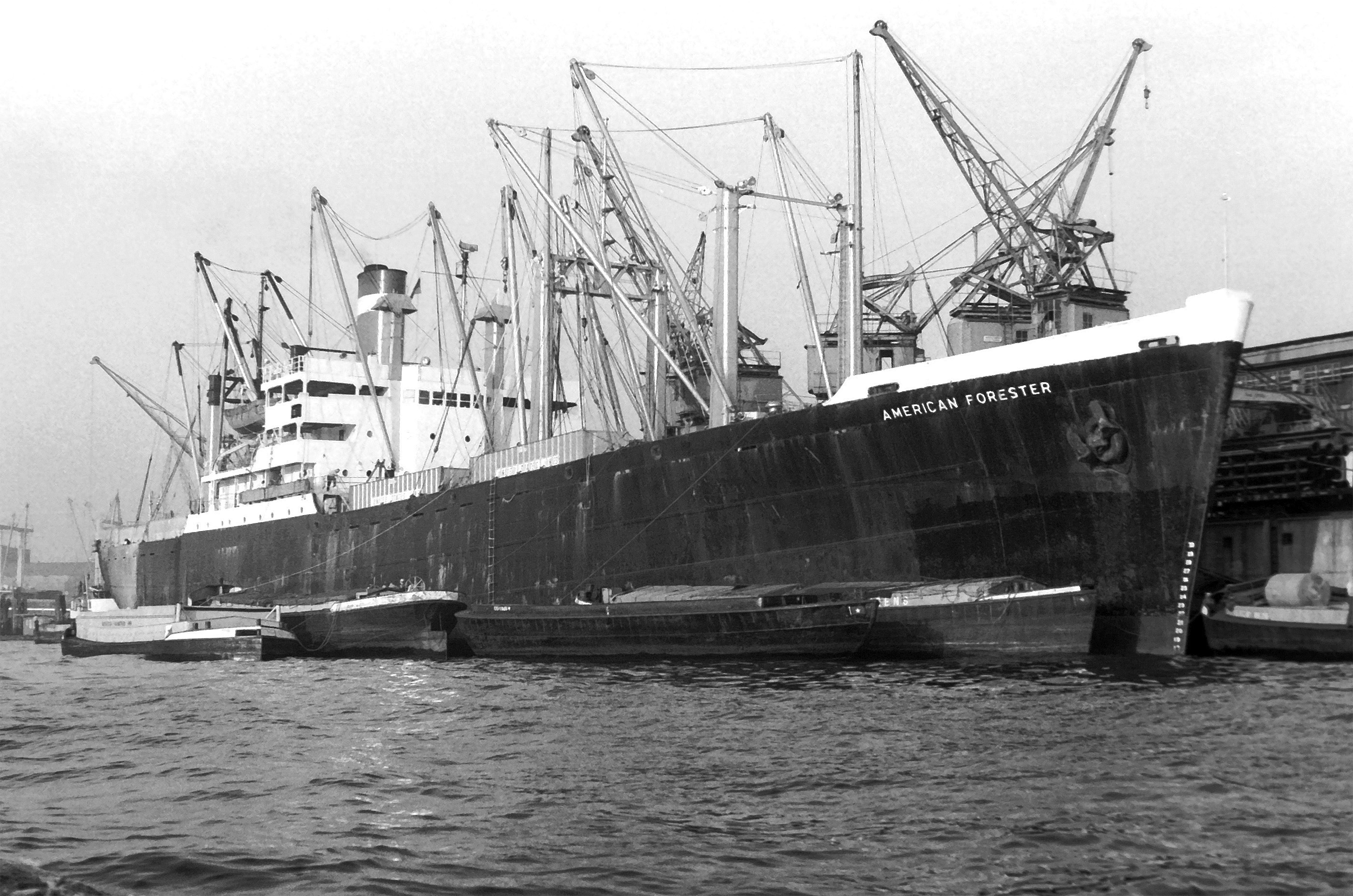
American Forester of type C2-S-B1 (1969

Subtypes of C2 Type ships
| Type | Total (328) | DWT | Builders | Example |
|---|---|---|---|---|
| C2-S-B1 | 115 | 9,150 | Federal SB, NJ; Moore DD, CA; Consolidated, CA; Western Pipe&Steel, CA | USNS Bald Eagle |
| C2-S-AJ1 | 64 | 10,755 | North Carolina SB, NC | USS Adirondack and USS Great Sitkin |
| C2-S-AJ3 | 32 | 11,300 | North Carolina | USS Tolland |
| C2-S-E1 | 30 | 10,565 | Gulf SB, AL | USS Wayne |
| C2 | 20 | 9,758 | Federal SB; Sun Yards, PA; Newport News, VA; Tampa SB | USS Polaris |
| C2-S-AJ5 | 10 | 10,400 | North Carolina | SS American Scout |
| C2-F | 7 | 9,390 | Federal SB | USS Oberon |
| C2-S | 6 | 9,970 | Bethlehem Sparrows Point, MD | USS Alhena |
| C2-S-B1-R | 6 | 7,640 | Moore Dry Dock | |
| C2-S-AJ4 | 6 | 9,652 | North Carolina | (Santa ships) as in SS Santa Luisa |
| C2-S-AJ2 | 5 | 10,350 | North Carolina | USS Southampton |
| C2-SU-R | 5 | 8,595 | Sun Yards, PA | MS Stag Hound |
| C2-T | 4 | 8,656 | Tampa SB, FL | USS Shasta |
| C2-S-A1 | 4 | 8,130 | Bath Iron Works, ME | SS Empire Oriole |
| C2-SU | 3 | 9,620 | Sun Yards, PA | |
| C2-S1-B1 | 3 | 7,640 | Moore Dry Dock | |
| C2-S1-DG2 | 3 | 8,720 | Federal SB | three cargo-passenger ship: SS Santa Monica, SS Santa Clara and SS Santa Sofia |
| C2-N | 3 | 6,350 | Tampa SB | three ships: USS Akutan, USS Mauna Loa and USS Mazama |
| C2-G | 2 | 9,020 | Federal SB | two ships SS Santa Elisa and SS Santa Rita were both torpedoed in 1942. |

=== Modified and redesignated ===
- Stores Ship – AF (11)
  - 3 Aldebaran-class (C2)
    - Aldebaran (AF-10), Polaris (AF-11), Jupiter (AK-43)
  - 2 Hyades-class (C2-S-E1)
    - Hyades (AF-28), Graffias (AF-29)
  - 6 of 10 Alstede-class (C2-S-B1-R)
    - AF-50, AF-51, AF-52, AF-54, AF-60, AF-61
- Attack Transports – APA (1 + 6AP)
  - 3 Ormsby-class attack transports (C2-S-B1)
    - APA-49, APA-50, APA-51 (AP-94, AP-95, AP-96)
  - 4 Sumter-class attack transports (C2-S-E1)
    - APA-52, APA-53, APA-54 (AP-97, AP-98, AP-99)
    - APA-94
- Transports – AP (13)
  - 7 La Salle-class (C2-S-B1)
  - 3 Tryon-class (C2-S-A1)
  - 2 Storm King-class (C2-S-AJ1)
  - Thurston (AP-77) (C2-F)
- Cargo ship – AK (21 + 1 AKA)
  - Arcturus (AK-18) ... Electra (AK-21)
  - Alchiba (AK-23) ... Alhena (AK-26), Betelgeuse (AK-28)
  - Mercury (AK-42), Jupiter (AK-43)
  - Libra (AK-53) ... Oberon (AK-56)
  - Andromeda (AK-64) ... Virgo (AK-69)
  - Wyandot (AK-283) (AKA-92) (in 1963)
- Attack Cargo Ships – AKA (60 + 17AK)
  - Alhena (AKA-9) (AK-26)
  - 11 Arcturus-class (C2, C2-F, C2-T)
    - AKA-1 ... AKA-4 (AK-18 ... AK-21)
    - AKA-6 ... AKA-8 (AK-23 ... AK-25)
    - AKA-11 ... AKA-14 (AK-28, AK-53, AK-55, AK-56)
  - 32 Tolland-class (C2-S-AJ3)
    - AKA-64 ... AKA-87, AKA-101 ... 108
  - 30 Andromeda-class (C2-S-B1)
    - AKA-15 ... AKA-20 (prev: AK-64 ... AK-69)
    - AKA-53 ... AKA-63, AKA-88 ... AKA-100
- General Stores Issue Ship – AKS (2 + 2AK)
  - 3 Castor-class general stores issue ships
    - Castor (AKS-1), Pollux (AKS-2), Pollux (AKS-4) (AK-54)
  - Mercury (AKS-20) (AK-42)
- Ammunition ship – AE (15 + 2AKA)
  - 7 Lassen-class (C2, C2-T, C2-N)
    - USS Lassen (AE-3), Kilauea, Rainier, Shasta (AE-6)
    - Mauna Loa (AE-8), Mazama (AE-9)
    - Akutan (AE-13)
  - 8 Mount Hood-class (C2-S-AJ1)
  - Converted from Andromeda-class in 1965
    - Virgo (AE-30) (prev: Virgo (AKA-20))
    - Chara (AE-31) (prev: Chara (AKA-58))
- Aviation Supply Ship – AVS (1AK)
  - Jupiter (AVS-8) (AK-43)
- Command ship – AGC (15)
  - 4 Appalachian-class
    - Appalachian (AGC-1) ... Rocky Mount (AGC-3), Catoctin (AGC-5)
  - 8 Mount McKinley-class
    - Mount McKinley (AGC-7) ... Teton (AGC-14)
  - 3 Adirondack-class
    - Adirondack (AGC-15) ... Taconic (AGC-17)

== Notable incidents ==
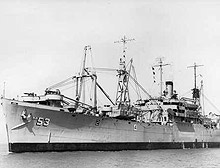
USS Achernar, a C2-S-B1 ship

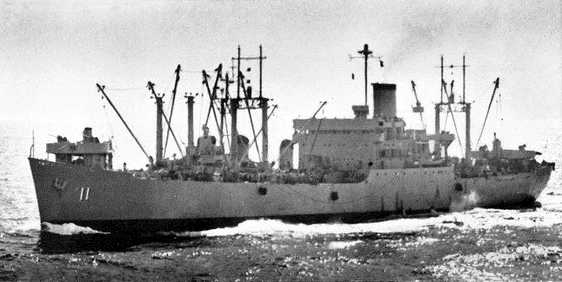
USS Polaris operating off Korea, 1953, a C2

- Highflier a C2-S-B, exploded and sank during the Texas City Disaster in 1947.
- Wild Rover a C2-S-B1, renamed Mormackite, capsized in heavy seas and sank off Cape Henry on 7 October 1954. Survivors were attacked by sharks.
- USS Starlight, a C2-S-AJ1, on 26 December 1969 with a full load of 8,900 bombs, rockets, shells and mines bound for Da Nang, South Vietnam, cargo shifted and a bomb went off in rough seas. On 5 January 1970 she sank north of Midway Atoll. Twenty-nine members of her crew died during the evacuation.
- USS Towner, a C2-S-AJ3, renamed SS Guam Bear, was wrecked and sank in 1967. She was in a collision outside Apra Harbor, Guam. A constructive total loss, the hulk was towed 2 nautical miles (3.7 km; 2.3 mi) off shore and scuttled.
- SS American Shipper, a C2-S-AJ5. Delivered December 1945. Sank in 1974 in the Balintang Channel, 400 miles (640 km) southeast of Hong Kong.
- SS Santa Elisa was torpedoed in 1942 and sank off Tunisia.
- SS Santa Rita was torpedoed in 1942, sank in North Atlantic.
- SS Louise Lykes was torpedoed and sank in the North Atlantic in 1943.
- SS Shooting Star was torpedoed and sank in South Atlantic in 1943. One US Armed Guard killed.
- USS Pollux was wrecked and sank off Newfoundland in 1942.
- USS Mount Hood exploded and sank in the Admiralty Islands in 1944.
- SS Fairport was torpedoed and sank in the North Atlantic in 1942.
- SS Santa Catalina was torpedoed and sank off Georgia 1943.
- SS African Star was torpedoed and sank in the South Atlantic in 1942.
- SS African Dawn (CH-111) collided with a tanker in convoy, 2300 hrs, Oct 28 1943.

== See also ==
- Type C1 ship
- Type C3 ship
- Type C4 ship
- Type R ship
- T1 tanker
- T2 tanker
- T3 tanker
- Liberty ship
- Victory ship
- U.S. Merchant Marine Academy

== General and cited references ==
- Lane, Frederic C. (21 September 2001). Ships for Victory: A History of Shipbuilding under the U.S. Maritime Commission in World War II. JHU Press. ISBN 0-8018-6752-5.
- Sawyer, L. A. & Mitchell, W. H. (1981). From America to United States: The History of the long-range Merchant Shipbuilding Programme of the United States Maritime Commission. London: World Ship Society.
- United States Maritime Commission C2 Type Ships
