= USS Bedford Victory =

Cargo ship of the United States Navy

History

United States
- Name: Bedford Victory
- Namesake: City of Bedford, Indiana
- Ordered: as type (VC2-S-AP2) hull, MCV hull 540
- Builder: Permanente Metals Corporation, Richmond, California
- Yard number: Yard No.1
- Laid down: 20 July 1944
- Launched: 23 September 1944
- Sponsored by: Mrs. Raymond A. Kremp
- Acquired: 11 November 1944
- Commissioned: 11 November 1944
- Decommissioned: 29 March 1946
- Stricken: 28 August 1946
- Identification: Hull symbol: AK-231
- Honors and awards: one battle star for World War II service
- Fate: Sold for scrapping, 28 March 1972, to Bruce A. Blakey for non-transportation use (PD-X-932) for $53,000

General characteristics
- Class & type: Boulder Victory-class cargo ship
- Displacement: 4,480 long tons (4,550 t) (standard); 15,580 long tons (15,830 t) (full load)
- Length: 455 ft (139 m)
- Beam: 62 ft (19 m)
- Draft: 29 ft 2 in (8.89 m)
- Installed power: 6,000 shp (4,500 kW)
- Propulsion: 1 × Westinghouse turbine; 2 × Foster Wheeler header-type boilers, 525psi 750°; double Westinghouse Main Reduction Gears; 1 × shaft
- Speed: 15.5 kn (17.8 mph; 28.7 km/h)
- Complement: 99 officers and enlisted
- Armament: 1 × 5 in (130 mm)/38-caliber dual-purpose gun; 1 × 3 in (76 mm)/50-caliber dual-purpose gun; 8 × 20 mm (0.79 in) Oerlikon cannons anti-aircraft gun mounts

USS Bedford Victory (AK-231) was a Boulder Victory-class cargo ship Victory ship acquired by the U.S. Navy during World War II. She served in the Pacific Ocean theatre of operations through the end of the war, earning one battle star, and then returned to the United States for disposal.

== Service history ==
Bedford Victory (AK-231) was laid down on 20 July 1944, at Richmond, California, by the Permanente Metals Corporation under a U.S. Maritime Commission contract (MCV hull 540); launched on 30 September 1944; sponsored by Mrs. Raymond A. Kremp; acquired by the Navy on Armistice Day 1944; and commissioned that same day. The Navy acquired Bedford Victory and several of her sisters in response to an urgent need for additional ammunition carriers to keep the greatly expanded U.S. Pacific Fleet supplied during the final surge against the Empire of Japan. Necessity, therefore, obviated major conversion efforts and kept her fitting out and shakedown training periods unavoidably brief.

She completed her shakedown cruise on 27 November and began taking on a cargo of ammunition at Port Chicago, California. The ship stood out of San Francisco Bay on 15 December and—after stops at Pearl Harbor, Eniwetok Atoll, and Saipan—arrived at Ulithi on 16 January 1945. There, Bedford Victory became a unit of Service Squadron (ServRon) 10. Over the next four weeks, her crew worked feverishly rearming fleet units as they pulled into the anchorage for provisions, fuel, and ammunition. In February, the ship began visiting other ports of call, rearming warships at Leyte Gulf, Guam, and Saipan in addition to Ulithi. Late in April, Bedford Victory joined a convoy of oilers bound for the Ryukyu Islands where the last campaign of World War II had already begun. On the 27th, she and her consorts became elements of Task Group (TG) 50.8, the mobile replenishment group supporting the U.S. 5th Fleet. For almost a month, she steamed in a holding area a day's voyage to the east of Okinawa rearming various units of the 5th Fleet.

At the end of the third week in May, she and the ammunition ship USS Akutan (AE-13) parted company with Task Group 50.8 and set course for Kerama Retto, the small group of islands just west of the southern end of Okinawa. The two ships entered the fleet anchorage on 21 May and began two weeks of ammunition distribution there. Enemy air attacks frequently punctuated her activities, but Bedford Victory emerged undamaged from Kerama Retto on 6 June. She steamed in convoy via Saipan and Ulithi to Leyte Gulf. She remained there through the end of the war and for about two months thereafter. Early in November, the ship embarked upon the long voyage home, and she arrived in Seattle, Washington, on the 17th. Bedford Victory remained at Seattle until the end of the first week in February 1946. At that time, she moved south to San Francisco, California, where she was decommissioned on 29 March 1946. She was returned to the Maritime Commission that same day. Her name was struck from the Navy list on 28 August 1946. For the Korean War she served in the Hungnam Evacuation as a Military Sealift CommandService and Merchant Ship Participating in Hungnam Korea Redeployment.

Merchant Service: Shepard Steamship Company in 1947 and Isthmian Steamship Company in 1947, in post war work. She was laid up on 20 October 1947, in the National Defense Reserve Fleet James River. Merchant Service: American-Hawaiian Steamship Company 1950, Alaska SS Co., in 1950 to 1952. She was sent to the Pacific Reserve Fleet, Olympia on 5 May 1962 and scrapped on 28 March 1972 by Bruce A. Blakey.

== Honors and awards ==
Bedford Victory earned one battle star for her World War II service.

Qualified Bedford Victory personnel were eligible for the following:

- American Campaign Medal
- Asiatic-Pacific Campaign Medal (1)
- World War II Victory Medal
- Philippines Liberation Medal
