= SS Delalba =

A number of ships were named Delalba, including:

- SS Delalba (1919), an American cargo ship which ran aground in 1937
- SS Delalba (1942), an American Type C2-F ship
