= USS Polaris (AF-11) =

Cargo ship of the United States Navy

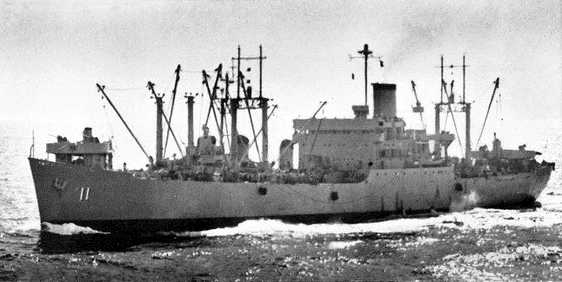
- USS Polaris operating off Korea, 1953

History

United States
- Name: SS Donald McKay
- Namesake: Donald McKay
- Laid down: 23 July 1938
- Launched: 22 April 1939
- Acquired: WWII: 27 January 1941; Korea: 6 October 1948
- Commissioned: WWII:4 April 1941
- Recommissioned: Korea: 1 July 1949
- Decommissioned: WWII: 18 January 1946; Korea: 12 January 1957
- In service: 1 July 1948
- Out of service: 12 January 1957
- Stricken: WWII: 7 February 1946; Korea: 10 October 1957
- Reinstated: 1 July 1949
- Honors and awards: WWII: one battle star; Korea: six battle stars: 1st UN Counter Offensive: 12 February-22 March 1951; Communist China Spring Offensive: 30 April-6 May 1951; UN Summer-Fall Offensive: 9-10, 24–25 July 1951; 8-12, 20–23 September 1951; 10-15, 24–27 October 1951; Second Korean Winter: 3-6, 11-12, 20-21, 29–31 December 1951; 3-6, 13–14 January 1952; 24–30 March 1952; Korean Defense summer–fall 1952 – 2 to 3 June 1962; Korea, summer–fall 1953 – 24 to 26 May 1953; 3 to 6 June 1953
- Fate: Sold to Levin Metals Corp. June 1974 for scrapping.

General characteristics
- Class & type: Aldebaran-class Type C2 ship (MARCOM)
- Tonnage: 5,443 DWT
- Displacement: 13,910 tons
- Length: 459 ft 3 in (139.98 m)
- Beam: 63 ft 0 in (19.20 m)
- Draft: 25 ft 10 in (7.87 m) (limiting)
- Installed power: 6,000 shp (4,500 kW)
- Propulsion: single propeller, one 2-stroke, 4-cylinder single-acting opposed-piston Doxford diesel engine
- Speed: 16.4 knots (30.4 km/h; 18.9 mph)
- Complement: 287
- Armament: 1 × single 5 in (130 mm) dual-purpose gun mount; 4 × single 3 in (76 mm) dual-purpose gun mounts; 10 × single 20 mm AA gun mounts

USS Polaris (AF-11) was a Type C2 "Liberty fleet" standard freighter and an Aldebaran-class stores ship acquired from the United States Maritime Commission by the US Navy for World War II and the Korean War. She was launched in 1939 at Sun Shipbuilding & Drydock Co., Chester, Pennsylvania.

== Service history ==
=== World War II and postwar ===
Polaris made five round trips from the U.S. East Coast to Reykjavík, Iceland from June 1942 to February 1943. She then made five voyages from the U.S. East Coast to Port of Spain, Trinidad, and San Juan, Puerto Rico, March to July 1943. From October 1943 to February 1944 she made four more voyages to the Caribbean, touching at Port of Spain, Trinidad; Guantanamo Bay, Cuba; Hamilton, Bermuda; the Virgin Islands; and San Juan, Puerto Rico.

From March through September 1944 Polaris made three round-trip voyages in convoy from the east coast to Oran, Algeria, and other Mediterranean ports. In October she made another voyage to the Caribbean.

On 10 November 1944 she departed New York for the Panama Canal Zone escorted by USS Leland E. Thomas and arrived at Cristóbal, Colón on 16 November 1944 for transit to the Pacific Ocean. Polaris then sailed to Enewetak, Saipan, Tinian, and Apra before returning to Seattle, Washington, on 9 January 1945.

She was underway on 16 January to Pearl Harbor, Eniwetok, and Ulithi. She returned to Los Angeles, California, on 31 March and was underway again 13 April on a replenishment cruise to the Carolines and the Ryukyus, firing on Tokashiki Island in the Ryukyus on 9 July, and returning to San Francisco on 30 August.

After serving in Japanese waters and on the China coast, Polaris was decommissioned on 18 January 1946. She was struck from the Naval Vessel Register 7 February 1946 and transferred to the Maritime Commission on 30 June 1946.

=== Korean War and fate ===
Polaris served in the Korean War with Service Squadron 1 and made six journeys to Korean waters between 29 January 1951 and 23 July 1954. Aldebaran-class provisions store ship set a record for her class in number of tons of provisions transferred per hour while on underway replenishment, delivering 116.10 tons per hour to the aircraft carrier USS Midway on 29 April 1955.

She was struck from the Naval Vessel Register 10 October 1957, and transferred to the Maritime Administration. Into 1970 she was in the National Defense Reserve Fleet berthed in Suisun Bay, California.
