= USS Jupiter (AK-43) =

Cargo ship of the United States Navy

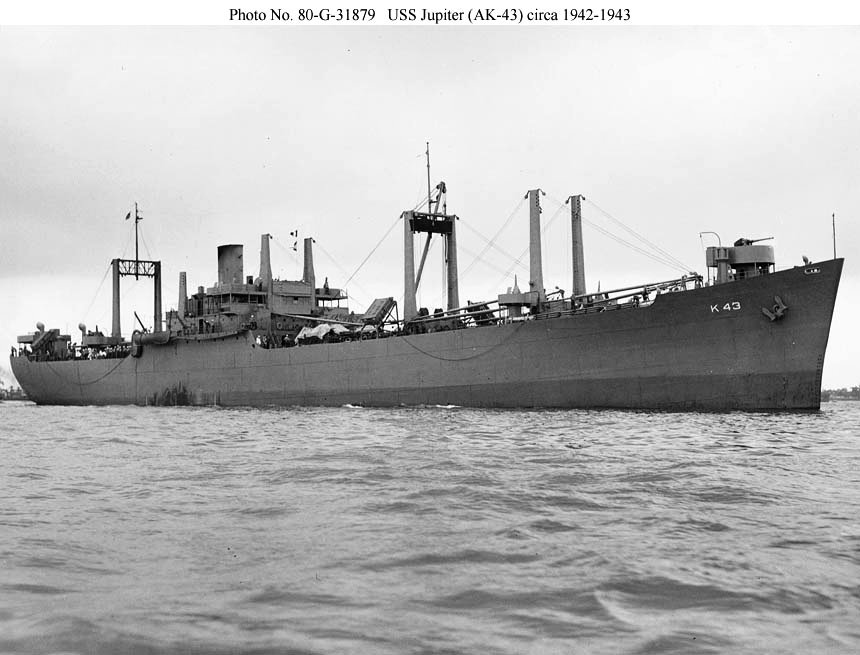
- USS Jupiter (AK-43), under way c. 1942-1943, location unknown

History

United States
- Name: Flying Cloud
- Owner: Grace Line Inc.
- Ordered: as (Type C2 ship) hull, MC hull 17
- Awarded: 9 May 1938
- Builder: Federal Shipbuilding and Dry Dock Company, Kearny, New Jersey
- Cost: $2,087,589.03
- Yard number: 8
- Way number: 157
- Laid down: 16 March 1939
- Launched: 30 September 1939
- Sponsored by: Mrs. Emma Guffey Miller
- In service: 1 November 1939
- Out of service: 19 June 1941
- Renamed: Santa Catalina, November 1940
- Identification: Callsign: WDJB
- Fate: Transferred to US Navy, 19 June 1941

United States
- Name: Santa Catalina (19 June 1941); Jupiter (20 June 1941–)
- Namesake: Santa Catalina; The planet Jupiter
- Commissioned: 22 August 1942
- Decommissioned: 23 May 1947
- Reclassified: Aviation Supply Issue Ship (AVS), 31 July 1945
- Identification: Hull symbol: AK-43; Hull symbol: AVS-8; Code letters: NOPF (as AK); Code letters: NCBV (as AVS)
- Recommissioned: 10 October 1950
- Decommissioned: June 1964
- Stricken: 1 August 1965
- Fate: Laid up in the Olympia Reserve Fleet, in Olympia, Washington, 25 June 1964, sold for scrapping, 12 March 1971

General characteristics
- Class & type: Aldebaran-class cargo ship (1942–1945); Grumium-class aviation supply issue ship (1945–1965)
- Tonnage: 9,758 DWT
- Displacement: 7,293 long tons (7,410 t) (light); 10,850 long tons (11,020 t) (full load)
- Length: 459 ft 2 in (139.95 m)
- Beam: 63 ft (19 m)
- Draft: 25 ft 10 in (7.87 m)
- Installed power: 2 × Babcock & Wilcox D-type boilers, 465 psi (3,210 kPa), 765 °F (407 °C); 6,000 shp (4,500 kW)
- Propulsion: 1 × General Electric geared turbine; 1 × General Electric double main reduction gear; 1 × propeller
- Speed: 16.4 kn (30.4 km/h; 18.9 mph)
- Capacity: 494,667 cu ft (14,007.4 m^{3})
- Complement: 24 officers; 221 enlisted
- Armament: 1 × 5 in (130 mm)/38 caliber gun; 1 × 3 in (76 mm)/50 caliber gun dual purpose gun; 4 × single 20 mm (0.79 in) Oerlikon cannon AA mounts

USS Jupiter (AK-43/AVS-8) was an Aldebaran-class cargo ship commissioned by the US Navy for service in World War II. She was responsible for delivering necessary goods and equipment to ships and stations in the war zone. Shortly before the end of the war she was reclassified as a Jupiter-class aviation stores issue ship AVS-8. She was named after the planet Jupiter.

== Construction ==
Flying Cloud was laid down under a Maritime Commission (MARCOM) contract, MCE hull 17, on 16 March 1939, by Federal Shipbuilding & Drydock Company, in Kearny, New Jersey. She was launched on 30 September 1939, sponsored by Mrs. Emma Guffey Miller, the sister of US Senator Joseph Guffey, of Pennsylvania. Flying Cloud was turned over to her new owner, Grace Line Inc., 1 November 1939.

== Civilian service ==
Flying Cloud spent her pre-war years hauling lumber and other goods between West Coast ports and South American ports. In November 1940, she was renamed Santa Catalina. On 19 June 1941, she was acquired by the US Navy.

== Service history ==
On 20 June 1941, she was renamed Jupiter; and commissioned 22 August 1942.

=== 1942 ===
Jupiter departed San Diego, California, 1 September 1942, for operations in the Pacific as the American campaign in the Solomon Islands was getting under way. From September through December, she carried supplies and troops to staging areas for the Navy's first great offensive in the Pacific Ocean. She continued to discharge cargo in the Solomon Islands, through the early part of 1943, bringing invaluable support to the closing phases of the Guadalcanal Campaign.

=== 1943 ===
Jupiter departed Espiritu Santo 1 February 1943, commencing a series of three cruises to San Francisco, for supplies and personnel. On the first of these voyages she returned captured Japanese equipment, including a "Betty" bomber, a "Tony" fighter, and several "long lance" torpedoes.

The cargo ship returned to battle during the Gilbert Islands invasion in late November, landing equipment to aid in the successful assault on Tarawa.

=== 1944 ===
Jupiter then continued cargo operations until she was assigned to the [5th Amphibious Forces, in April 1944, for the Marianas campaign. She departed Pearl Harbor, 30 May, and arrived in the Saipan assault area 15 June. She discharged her cargo, despite constant enemy air attack, and 10 days later proceeded toward Eniwetok.

Following a summer of amphibious rehearsals, Jupiter, departed Guadalcanal, 8 September, to support the invasion of the Palau Islands. She unloaded her cargo without incident and returned to Manus, to prepare for the important Philippine invasion. Departing Hollandia, 16 October, she arrived at Leyte, and commenced unloading cargo, 22 October. As other units of the fleet were engaging the Japanese in the "Battle of Leyte Gulf", Jupiter returned to the Marianas, to pick up additional material. She continued reinforcing units in the Philippines until she steamed into Ulithi, 23 January 1945, to prepare for the next Campaign.

=== 1945 ===
When continued progress along the "road to Japan" required a stop-over base for B-29 raids on Tokyo, Iwo Jima was selected. Jupiter got underway 16 February 1945, with cargo and units of the 3rd Marine Division to secure this fortified atoll. After unloading her cargo under most difficult conditions, she remained in the area until Japanese resistance had ceased, 16 March.

After repairs at Pearl Harbor, Jupiter departed Hawaii on 1 May, with supplies for American troops fighting for Okinawa.

She returned to San Francisco, 27 July, for conversion to an aviation stores issue ship, and was redesignated AVS-8, 31 July 1945.

=== 1946–1947 ===
She was assigned to Occupation and China service, between March 1946 and February 1947, where she performed replenishment-at-sea exercises and supported outlying bases and ships. She was decommissioned at San Diego, 23 May 1947, and joining the Olympia Reserve Fleet, in Olympia, Washington.

=== 1950-1953 ===
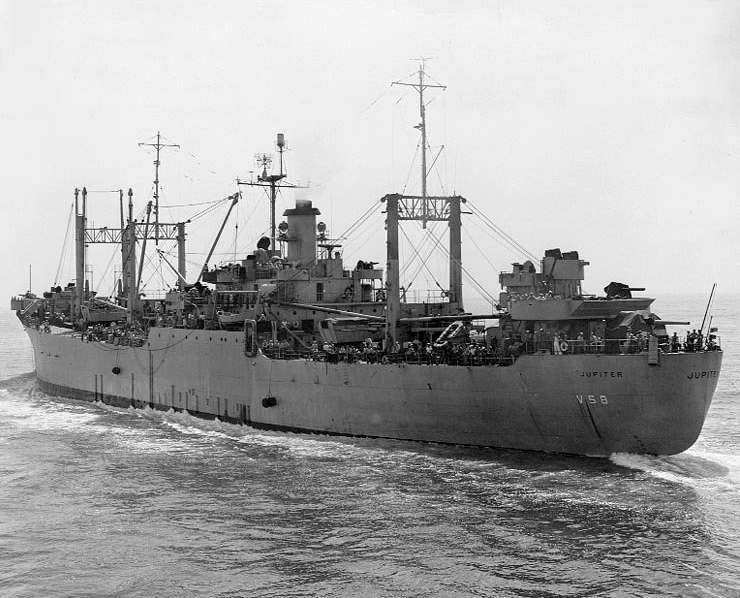
USS Jupiter (AVS-8), under way in the Sea of Japan, 1 August 1953

In June 1950, a new threat to world peace exploded in Asia, Communist aggression, in South Korea. The United States answered this challenge by dispatching troops and supplies to the war-torn peninsula. Jupiter recommissioned 10 October 1950, and sailed for Yokosuka, Japan, 8 January 1951. Arriving 29 January 1951, she operated out of Japan, replenishing units fighting ashore, until returning to San Francisco, 11 August 1952. After operations along the West Coast, the supply ship returned to the war zone in March 1953, to supply troops and replenish carriers engaged in air strikes on the Korean peninsula. Following the cessation of hostilities, Jupiter returned to the West Coast, 3 October.

=== 1954-1964 ===
Jupiter was again deployed to the Pacific, in 1954, to replenish ships in the tense Formosa area. The US 7th Fleet prevented any major crisis from developing, and Jupiter steamed into San Francisco, 20 October 1954. She resumed her operations in the Far East, March 1955; this time for an extended period. For the next 9 years, 1955–1963, she operated out of Yokosuka, replenishing units of the 7th Fleet, as it took on greater roles in "keeping the peace". During Jupiter's service in the Far Pacific, the 7th Fleet averted major crises in Formosa, Indonesia, and Laos; and played an important part in the Vietnam struggle.

== Fate ==
She continued to carry vital supplies to the Far East until she rejoined the National Defense Reserve Fleet, at Olympia, Washington, 25 June 1964. She was struck from the Navy List, on 1 August 1965. On 12 March 1971, she was sold for $65,100, to Zidell Explorations Corporation, for scrapping.

== Awards ==
Jupiter received six battle stars for World War II:

Capture and defense of Guadalcanal
Gilbert Islands operation
Marianas operation
Leyte operation
Iwo Jima operation
Okinawa Gunto operation

Jupiter received seven battle stars for Korean War service:

First UN Counter Offensive
Communist China Spring Offensive
UN Summer-Fall Offensive
Second Korean Winter
Korean Defense Summer-Fall 1952
Third Korean Winter
Korean Summer-Fall 1953

Her crew members were eligible for the following medals:

American Campaign Medal
Asiatic-Pacific Campaign Medal (6)
World War II Victory Medal
Navy Occupation Service Medal (with Asia clasp)
National Defense Service Medal (2)
Korean Service Medal (5)
Armed Forces Expeditionary Medal (1-Congo 3-Vietnam)
Philippines Liberation Medal (1)
United Nations Service Medal
Republic of Korea War Service Medal (retroactive)

== Bibliography ==
- "Jupiter II (AK-43)". Dictionary of American Naval Fighting Ships. Naval History and Heritage Command. 24 July 2015. This article incorporates text from this source, which is in the public domain.
- Priolo, Gary P. (24 May 2024). "Jupiter (AK-43)". NavSource.
- "JUPITER (AK-43/AVS-8)". United States Department of Transportation.
- "Flying Cloud".
