= USS Chara =

Cargo ship of the United States Navy

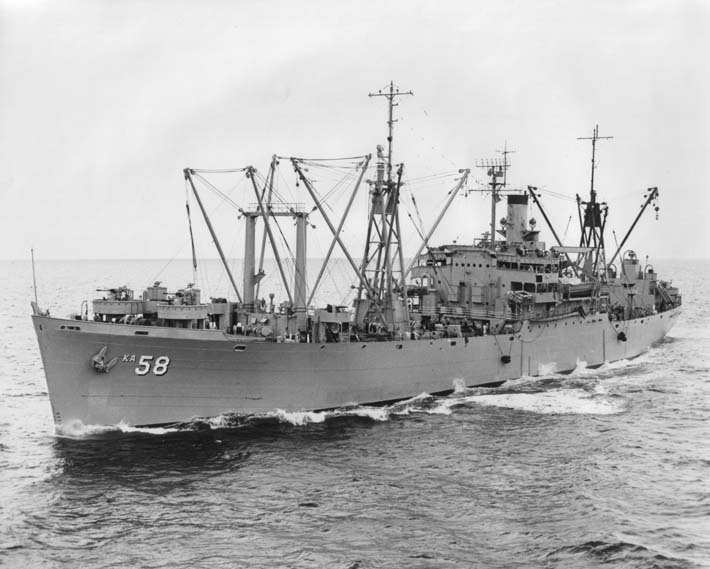
- USS Chara (AKA-58)

History

United States
- Name: USS Chara
- Namesake: The star Chara in the constellation Canes Venatici
- Builder: Federal Shipbuilding and Drydock Company, Kearny, New Jersey
- Launched: 15 March 1944
- Commissioned: 14 June 1944
- Decommissioned: 21 April 1959
- Recommissioned: 25 June 1966
- Decommissioned: March 1972
- Reclassified: AE-31, 25 June 1966
- Stricken: 10 March 1972
- Honours and awards: 4 battle stars (World War II); 7 battle stars (Korea)
- Fate: Sold for scrap, 12 November 1972

General characteristics
- Class & type: Andromeda-class attack cargo ship
- Type: Type C2-S-B1
- Displacement: 6,737 long tons (6,845 t)
- Length: 459 ft 3 in (139.98 m)
- Beam: 63 ft (19 m)
- Draft: 26 ft 4 in (8.03 m)
- Speed: 17 knots (31 km/h; 20 mph)
- Complement: 380
- Armament: 1 × 5"/38 caliber gun mount

USS Chara (AKA-58) was an Andromeda-class attack cargo ship named after a star in the constellation Canes Venatici. She was later converted to an ammunition ship and redesignated (AE-31).

Chara (AKA-58) was launched on 15 March 1944 by Federal Shipbuilding and Drydock Co., Kearny, New Jersey, under a Maritime Commission contract, sponsored by Mrs. E. P. McHugh, acquired by the Navy on 16 March 1944, and commissioned on 14 June 1944.

== Service history ==
=== 1944–1949 ===
Chara cleared Norfolk 22 July 1944 for Pearl Harbor, arriving on 10 August for training. Her initial combat action came on 20 October when she hove to in Leyte Gulf, with the Southern Attack Force, and swiftly landed troops and cargo in the momentous assault that was the first step in the liberation of the Philippines. Chara withdrew on 24 October, while the decisive naval Battle of Leyte Gulf raged in the area. She returned to New Guinea to reload essential supplies which she delivered to support the continuing land Battle of Leyte on 18 November.

After rehearsal landings in New Guinea, and staging at Manus, Chara cleared on 31 December 1944 for the assault on Lingayen. As TF 97 penetrated Philippine waters, on 8 January 1945, a Japanese kamikaze attack was hurled at them and succeeded in damaging one escort carrier of the group. On board Chara, three men were wounded, one fatally, as a result of the heavy anti-aircraft fire thrown up by the task force. The assaults were made on 9 January and 10 January, Chara's men landing their troops and cargo successfully despite heavy surf conditions and a beach so difficult that the Japanese never anticipated an amphibious assault in the location. Chara remained in the Leyte area, participating in the landings on San Antonio on 26 January, until 26 March, when she steamed from San Pedro Bay combat-loaded for the beaches of Okinawa.

Once again at Okinawa, her men worked skillfully in an amphibious assault, as Chara landed troops and heavy equipment on 1 April 1945. She remained off Okinawa in this invasion, famous for the Japanese desperation kamikaze attacks, to unload reinforcements and additional equipment until 6 April. After overhaul in the States and a return to Okinawa with cargo on 5 July, Chara returned to San Francisco where she loaded supplies for the Philippines, calling en route for additional supplies at Pearl Harbor, thus beginning a period of cargo operations in the Philippines and to Japan in support of the occupation.

She returned to the States in December 1945, then continued to support forces in the Far East until 1950, carrying men and cargo for the Naval Transportation Service, and after 1 October 1949, for the Military Sea Transportation Service.

=== 1950–1959 ===
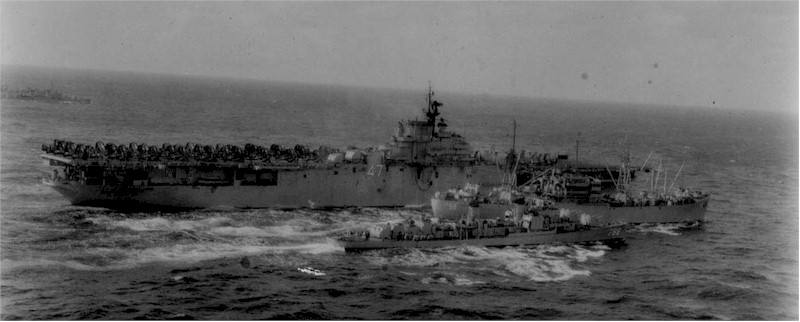
Chara replenishing carrier Philippine Sea (CV-47) and destroyer Hollister (DD-788), ca. 1950

With the outbreak of the Korean War, Chara was transferred to Service Force, Pacific Fleet, for duty as an ammunition ship, transporting and transferring all types of ammunition at sea to fleet units. She cleared San Francisco on 16 September 1950 to replenish TF 77 and support the evacuations of Hungnam and Wonsan before returning to San Francisco for overhaul on 26 March 1951. In her second Korean tour, 19 July 1951 to 18 May 1952, she joined the Mobile Logistics Support Force in operations in the Wonsan-Songjin bomb-line triangle, and in emergency lifts of Korean POWs from Koje-do to Ulsan. Another tour of providing at-sea replenishment of ammunition preceded the end of hostilities.

Chara later alternated duty in the western Pacific with training and upkeep on the west coast. In December 1954 and January 1955, she took part in the evacuation of the Tachen Islands. Active through 1958, Chara was placed out of commission in reserve at Astoria, Oregon, on 21 April 1959.

=== 1966–1972 ===
She was converted to an ammunition ship at Willamette Iron and Steel Works in Portland, Oregon, and recommissioned as AE-31 on 25 June 1966. After sea trials in July 1966, she supported Operation Rolling Thunder in Westpac and Vietnam. This included underway replenishment of aircraft carriers (such as USS Ranger) both off Vietnam and off the United States Coast. During an underway replenishment, her decks would be loaded with palettes of bombs six feet high, and in her cargo hold were 3,000-pound bombs used for airstrikes. During this time her US operational bases were in Vallejo, San Francisco Bay and Indian Island, Puget Sound. Chara was finally decommissioned in March 1972, and struck from the Naval Vessel Register on 10 March 1972. She was sold for scrap on 12 November 1972.

== Awards ==
Chara received four battle stars for service during World War II, seven for service during the Korean War, and eight for service in Vietnam.
