= USS Leland E. Thomas =

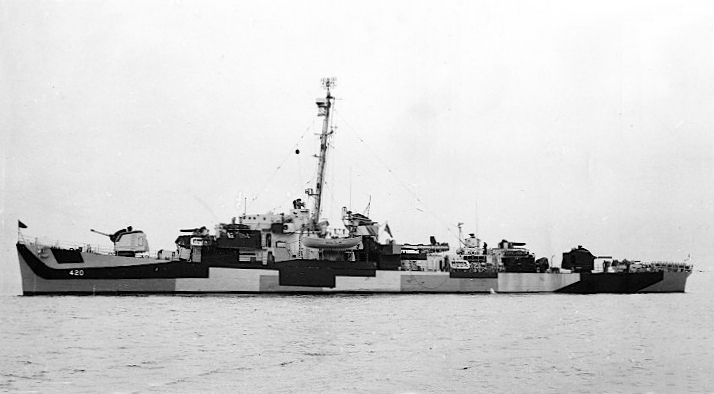
- Leland E. Thomas on 8 November 1944

History

United States
- Name: Leland E. Thomas
- Laid down: 21 January 1944
- Launched: 28 February 1944
- Commissioned: 19 June 1944
- Decommissioned: 3 May 1946
- Stricken: 1 December 1972
- Fate: Sold for scrapping 11 September 1973

General characteristics
- Class & type: John C. Butler-class destroyer escort
- Displacement: 1,350 long tons (1,372 t)
- Length: 306 ft (93 m) (oa)
- Beam: 36 ft 10 in (11.23 m)
- Draft: 13 ft 4 in (4.06 m) (max)
- Propulsion: 2 boilers, 2 geared steam turbines, 12,000 shp (8,900 kW), 2 screws
- Speed: 24 knots (44 km/h)
- Range: 6,000 nautical miles (11,000 km) at 12 knots (22 km/h)
- Complement: 14 officers, 201 enlisted
- Armament: 2 × single 5 in (127 mm) guns; 2 × twin 40 mm (1.6 in) AA guns; 10 × single 20 mm (0.79 in) AA guns; 1 × triple 21 in (533 mm) torpedo tubes; 8 × depth charge throwers; 1 × Hedgehog ASW mortar; 2 × depth charge racks

USS Leland E. Thomas (DE-420) was a John C. Butler-class destroyer escort in service with the United States Navy from 1944 to 1946. She was scrapped in 1973.

== Namesake ==
Leland Evan Thomas was born on 20 September 1918 in Ontario, Oregon. He enlisted in the United States Marine Corps Reserve on 10 September 1941 and was appointed air cadet on 15 October 1941. He was commissioned as a second lieutenant on 17 April 1942.

While serving in the Southwest Pacific Theater during World War II, he contributed to the sinking of an Imperial Japanese Navy cruiser and destroyer. He was killed in a friendly fire incident during the Guadalcanal campaign on 18 September 1942 while on a dawn patrol. He was posthumously awarded the Distinguished Flying Cross.

== History ==
Leland E. Thomas's keel was laid down on 21 January 1944 by Brown Shipbuilding Co. at their yard in Houston, Texas. The vessel was launched on 28 February 1944; sponsored by Mrs. Benjamin E. Thomas, mother of Lieutenant Thomas; and commissioned on 19 June 1944.

Following fitting out and tests at Galveston, Texas, and shakedown off Bermuda, Leland E. Thomas got underway for Massachusetts on 11 August, arriving at Boston on 13 August. After completing availability at the Boston Navy Yard, the destroyer escort headed for Norfolk, Virginia, arriving 25 August. Two days later she began hunter-killer operations along the U.S. East Coast until she headed for Maine 5 September, arriving at Casco Bay on 6 September. She operated along the Atlantic coast until she sailed for Italy on 20 September, escorting a convoy into Naples, Italy on 4 October.

The destroyer escort sailed for the United States on 10 October, escorting a convoy to New York City on 23 October. She got underway on 10 November escorting the storeship Polaris to the Panama Canal Zone, arriving Cristobal on 16 November.

Leland E. Thomas, with other ships of Escort Division 76, proceeded to the southwest Pacific 17 November, arriving at Manus 20 December. From 1 January to 19 February 1945, she escorted convoys between Leyte Gulf, Manus, and Hollandia. The destroyer escort was busy defending Mangarin Bay, Mindoro, and patrolling lanes in the Sulu Sea, Mindoro Strait, and western approaches to Luzon until 17 March. On 4 March, while she was investigating a possible submarine sighting south of San Jose de Buenavista, Panay, her lookouts spotted enemy planes on a nearby airstrip. Immediately the ship requested fighter-bombers which soon effectively bombed the airstrip. From 18 March to 28 April, she escorted ships and convoys within the Philippine sea frontier.

From 29 April to 9 June 1945, she protected Polloc Harbor, Mindanao, and operated with the Davao Gulf 3d Resupply Echelon and the Davao Gulf Attack Unit. Leland E. Thomas bombarded Falisay Point area, north of Cape San Augustan, Davao Gulf on 19 May and on 1 June with the destroyer Flusser shelled Luayan Point. The same task unit participated in the landing on Balut Island, Sarangani Group. The ship headed for Borneo escorting Chepachet to a fueling rendezvous with the task group which bombarded Balikpapan, Borneo. Later she patrolled the outer anchorage area in Balikpapan during the initial landings. On 20 July she set course for Subic Bay, arriving 28 July. Leland E. Thomas was busy escorting convoys between Subic Bay and Okinawa when the war ended 15 August, and continued on this duty, touching at Manila and other Philippine Islands ports until 28 November.

== Fate ==
She got underway from Samar, Philippines for home via Eniwetok and Pearl Harbor, arriving San Pedro, Los Angeles, 17 December 1945. She decommissioned 3 May 1946 and entered the Pacific Reserve Fleet Group at San Diego, California. On 1 September 1972 she was struck from the Navy list, and, on 11 September 1973, she was sold for scrapping.

== Awards ==
Leland E. Thomas received one battle star for World War II service.
