= Francis A. Dales =

American sailor (1923–2003)

Francis Alonzo "Lonnie" Dales
- Francis A. Dales during World War II
- Born: December 3, 1923; Augusta, GA
- Died: March 29, 2003 (aged 79); Augusta, GA
- Military career
- Allegiance: United States
- Branch: U.S. Merchant Marine
- Conflicts: Operation Pedestal, Second World War

Francis Alonzo Dales (December 3, 1923 – March 29, 2003) was a cadet midshipman in the United States Merchant Marine Academy who served on the freighter SS Santa Elisa, and subsequently the tanker SS Ohio, during Operation Pedestal, a convoy to the besieged island of Malta in World War II. For his actions defending the convoy, considered one of the most important British strategic victories of the war, he was awarded the Merchant Marine Distinguished Service Medal, the highest award available to the merchant marine.

== Initial training ==
Dales began his basic training as a cadet midshipman in temporary facilities at Fort Schuyler in February 1942, and became one of the first graduates of the United States Merchant Marine Academy at its new campus at King's Point.

== Background ==
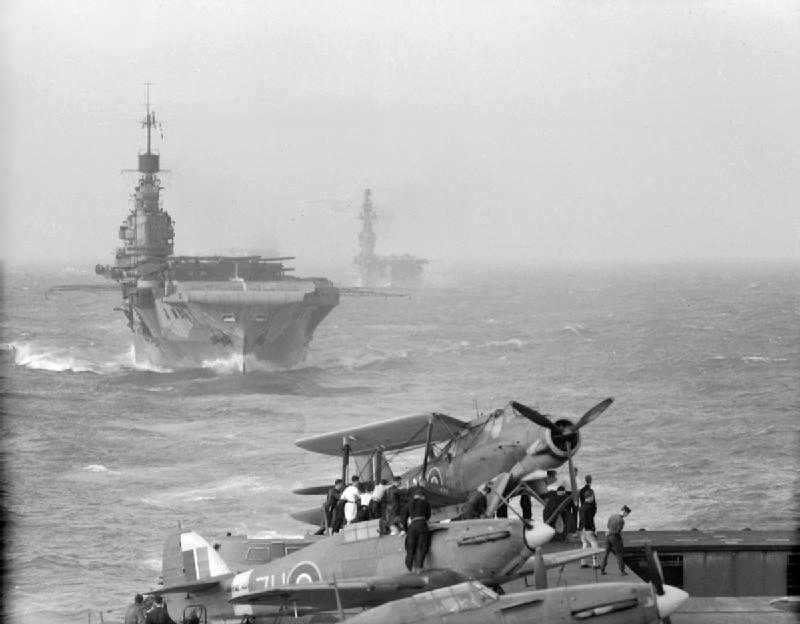
HMS Indomitable with HMS Eagle behind her, viewed from the flight deck of HMS Victorious. All three of these aircraft carriers took part in Operation Pedestal.

In summer 1942, supplies on the British occupied Mediterranean island of Malta were running desperately low. There were acute food shortages, but even more serious was the lack of aviation fuel, needed to sustain the dozens of fighter aircraft defending the island against German Luftwaffe and Italian Regia Aeronautica bombing attacks. It was later said that Malta would have been forced to surrender in only sixteen days if fuel had not got through. The British conceived a plan to resupply Malta using fourteen merchant ships escorted by a vast armada of Royal Navy warships; four aircraft carriers, two battleships, seven cruisers and 32 destroyers.

Axis forces opposing the convoy included land-based Italian and German aircraft, Italian and German motor torpedo boats, Italian submarines and a force of Italian cruisers, as well as naval mines laid by ships and aircraft in the path of the convoy. There were also hostile shore batteries on some of the coastlines the convoy had to pass.

The most important ship of the operation was the SS Ohio, the only available fast oil tanker. The Ohio, a 9,263 ton tanker, was built on the River Delaware at Wilmington in the United States for the oil giant Texaco, but had been requisitioned and manned by a British crew. In addition to the fuel supplies on the Ohio, several of the merchant ships carried fuel in drums.

Malta was critical to the Allied war effort in the Mediterranean Theater of Operations, with submarines and aircraft based there responsible for inflicting huge losses on supply convoys from Europe to Rommel's Axis army facing the British in the Western Desert Campaign in Libya and Egypt. In summer 1942 the Axis forces had advanced far eastwards into Egypt, threatening to reach the Suez Canal and thereby cut Allied communications with India and the Far East. The continued resistance of Malta was key to stopping Rommel, and British Prime Minister Winston Churchill ordered that the convoy must "get through at all costs".

== SS Santa Elisa ==
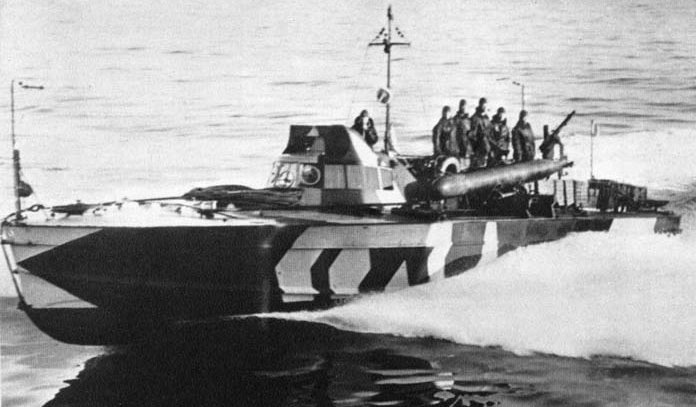
Italian motor torpedo boat in the Mediterranean Sea, of a type similar to those that attacked the Santa Elisa

Most of the merchant ships in the convoy were British owned and crewed. The SS Santa Elisa, a 6,200 ton freighter, was one of two American operated ships. She was carrying 7,000 tons of aviation fuel in drums. Dales had been assigned to the Santa Elisa for sea training. Commanding an anti-aircraft gun on top of the bridge, the most exposed position on the ship with no cover available he took part in the initially successful defence against three days of heavy attacks while steaming eastwards from the straits of Gibraltar towards Malta.

Air attacks were constant and as many as 15 submarines stalked the freighters in the narrowing straits, but the Santa Elisa would fall to a different foe. In the darkness before daybreak on the fourth day, the Santa Elisa was attacked by two Italian MAS motor torpedo boats. One raked the ship with fire from its heavy machine guns, killing three men from Dales' gun crew, while the other attacked from the opposite side and hit the ship with a torpedo. Dales successfully fired back and hit and sank the first attacking boat, but the aviation fuel carried by the Santa Elisa had been ignited by the torpedo hit, and the crew were forced to abandon the blazing ship about 25 miles (40 km) southeast of Cape Bon in Tunisia, and still 90 miles (140 km) short of Malta. Dales and other survivors were picked up two hours later by the Royal Navy destroyer HMS Penn.

== SS Ohio ==
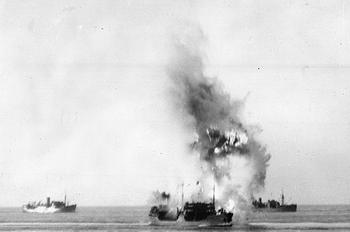
Ohio hit by a torpedo from the Italian submarine Axum

By this time the Ohio had already become the primary focus for Axis attacks on the convoy, having been torpedoed by the Italian submarine Axum and hit by successive waves of dozens of Stuka dive bombers which attacked continuously for five hours. The torpedo had caused catastrophic damage and initially brought the ship to a dead stop, while near misses from bombs caused further damage and put some of the ship's defensive armament out of action. The crew were twice forced to abandon ship as further air attacks caused yet more damage.

HMS Penn, with Dales still aboard, was one of several British destroyers that came alongside the Ohio to render assistance. The crews made attempts to tow the crippled tanker, before eventually sandwiching it between HMS Penn and HMS Bramham in order to drag it along while preventing it from sinking. Seeing that one of the Ohio's anti-aircraft guns could be repaired, another survivor from the Santa Elisa, junior third officer Frederick August Larsen, boarded the ship. Dales and four British crewmen volunteered to go with him. Between them, they were successful in bringing the gun back into action.

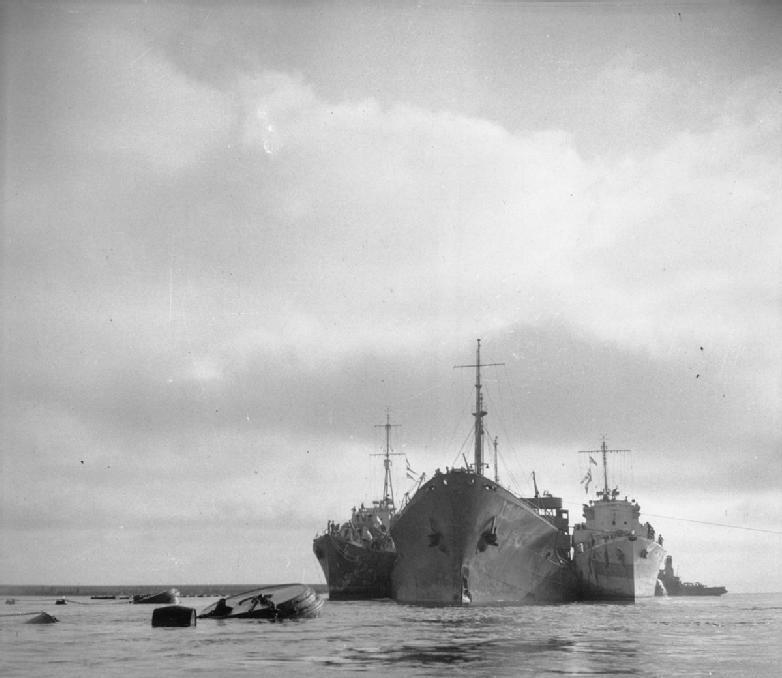
Ohio supported by destroyers. HMS Penn, which rescued Dales after the sinking of the Santa Alisa, is on the left.

Dales and the other crew members then operated the gun as the ungainly gaggle of ships struggled slowly towards Malta. The three ships became an obvious target for the Axis aircraft and torpedo boats, and endured an ever increasing series of attacks. In the chaos, all but one of the British aircraft carriers supporting the convoy had been either sunk or seriously damaged, reducing the number of aircraft available to defend it. Dales and the other gunners were successful in driving off most of the attacks, despite more bombs hitting the ship and two downed aircraft even crashing on the tanker's deck. With the Ohio now critically damaged and her deck awash, they inched within range of the protection of British Spitfire and Beaufighter fighters flying from Malta.

The Ohio finally reached the Grand Harbour at Valletta in Malta on August 15, 1942, and her vital cargo of fuel was safe. Four of the surviving freighters had reached Malta the day before, but the rest of the 14 merchant ships were lost. The convoy's arrival was described by some historians as having changed the course of the war. The captain of the Ohio, Dudley William Mason, was awarded the George Cross. The arrival, welcomed by huge crowds of people lining the harbor and waving British and Maltese flags, coincided with the Feast of Santa Marija, and Operation Pedestal became known in Malta as the Santa Marija Convoy. The Ohio was damaged beyond repair and never undertook another voyage. It was inducted into the National Maritime Hall of Fame of the American Merchant Marine Museum in 2008.

== Distinguished Service Medal ==
On May 22, 1943, National Maritime Day in the United States, Dales was awarded the Merchant Marine Distinguished Service Medal in front of 2,300 other cadet midshipmen at the United States Merchant Marine Academy, for his bravery in defense of the convoy, described as "heroism beyond the call of duty". Dales was only the third Cadet Midshipman ever to receive the medal.

== Later life ==
Dales was interviewed in connection with the 60th anniversary celebration of Operation Pedestal in 2002, and said that he would always remember the Maltese people's grateful response to his actions on board the Ohio.

Dales died in Augusta, Georgia, on March 29, 2003. He was inducted into the U.S. Merchant Marine Academy's National Maritime Hall of Fame in 2009, one year after the ship he had defended received the same honor.

== Bibliography ==
- At All Costs: How a Crippled Ship and Two American Merchant Mariners Turned the Tide of World War II, Sam Moses, Random House, 2007. ISBN 978-0-345-47674-6
