= USS Akutan =

Ammunition ship of the United States Navy

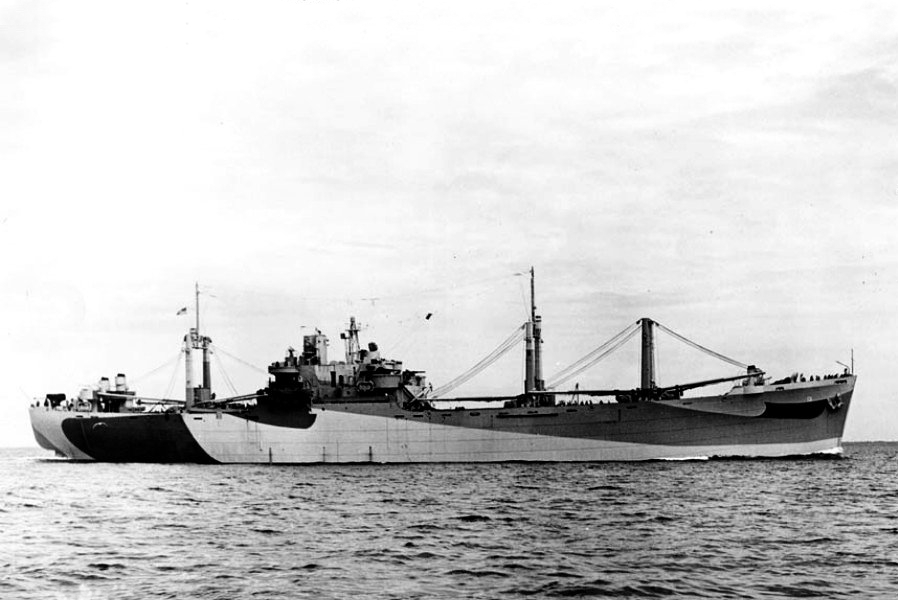

History

United States
- Name: USS Akutan (AE-13)
- Namesake: Akutan Island
- Laid down: 20 June 1944
- Launched: 17 September 1944
- Commissioned: 15 February 1945
- Decommissioned: 19 October 1946
- Stricken: 1 May 1960
- Fate: unknown

General characteristics
- Class & type: Lassen-class ammunition ship
- Displacement: Light: 6,350 tons; Full load:13,855 tons
- Length: 459 ft (140 m)
- Beam: 63 ft (19.2 m)
- Draught: 25 ft 11 in (7.9 m)
- Propulsion: 2 x 9 cyl. Nordberg diesel engines each with 3155 brake horsepower at 225 rpm geared to 1 shaft
- Speed: 16 knots (30 km/h)
- Capacity: 5,000 deadweight tons
- Complement: 280 officers and enlisted
- Armament: 1 × single 5 in (127 mm) 38 caliber gun; 4 × single 3 in (76 mm) 50 caliber guns; 2 × twin 40 mm guns; 8 × twin 20 mm guns

USS Akutan (AE-13) was a Lassen-class ammunition ship commissioned in the United States Navy. She was laid down on 20 June 1944 at Tampa, Fla., by the Tampa Shipbuilding Co.; launched on 17 September 1944; sponsored by Mrs. Rosswell B. Daggett, the wife of Capt. Daggett, USN, the supervisor of shipbuilding at Tampa; and commissioned on 15 February 1945. She was named after Akutan Island, an active volcano in the Aleutian Islands of Alaska.

== Service history ==
Following shakedown training in the Chesapeake Bay, the ammunition ship entered the Norfolk Navy Yard for an availability. In early April, she moved to Earle, N.J., to take on ammunition and cargo. On the 9th, Akutan shaped a course for the Pacific. She transited the Panama Canal on 16 April and proceeded independently to Ulithi, Caroline Islands. Upon reaching that advanced base on 11 May, the ship reported to Service Squadron 10, Service Force, Pacific Fleet.

On 15 May, Akutan got underway with Task Group (TG) 50.8, bound for Okinawa. The ship arrived there on the 21st and operated from that island during the next four weeks, supplying ammunition to various units of the fleet. She sailed for Ulithi on 18 June and weathered a typhoon before arriving there on the 22d. Two days later, the vessel shaped a course for Leyte, Philippine Islands.

Akutan reached San Pedro Bay on 26 June and was assigned to Service Squadron 8 for duty. She remained in Philippine waters until mid-August discharging and receiving ammunition. On 14 August the ship got underway with TG 30.8 to replenish ammunition for vessels of the 3d Fleet. The following day, Japan capitulated. Akutan returned to San Pedro Bay on 10 September and operated there until 28 October, when she sailed for the east coast of the United States. The ship paused en route at Eniwetok and Pearl Harbor, retransmitted the Panama Canal, and reached Norfolk in December.

Following a brief stay there, Akutan sailed to Earle, N.J., to discharge her ammunition. When her cargo had been unloaded, the ship got underway for Orange, Tex., in January 1946. She left Texas on 10 March and proceeded to New Orleans, Louisiana, to undergo repairs. [Docked at Algiers, Akutan took on 3,000 tons of gas shells—causing the crew to be issued gas masks for the duration.] Five days later, the vessel set sail for Houston, Tex., disposing of her cargo of gas shells off the Florida coast, en route. and upon arriving there, entered a shipyard for further repairs. On 26 April, the ship returned to Orange, Tex., and began preparations for deactivation. Akutan was decommissioned on 19 October 1946. her name was struck from the Navy list on 1 July 1960, and the ship was transferred to the Maritime Administration for layup at Beaumont, Tex.

== Awards and honors ==
Akutan earned two battle stars and the Philippine Liberation Ribbon for her World War II service.
