= SS Santa Elisa =

1941 cargo ship

History
- Name: SS Santa Elisa
- Owner: United States Maritime Commission (USMC)
- Operator: Grace Line
- Port of registry: (United States) Wilmington, Delaware
- Builder: Federal Shipbuilding; Kearny, New Jersey
- Yard number: 179
- Launched: 29 May 1941
- Completed: 15 July 1941
- Identification: U.S. Official #: 240800; Signal: WHYH
- Fate: Sunk by Italian MAS torpedo boat, 13 August 1942

General characteristics
- Type: Type C2-G ship
- Tonnage: 8,379 GRT
- Length: 439 ft 0 in (133.81 m)
- Beam: 63 ft 2 in (19.25 m)
- Draft: 27 ft 5 in (8.36 m)
- Decks: three decks
- Propulsion: 2 General Electric steam turbines, geared to a single screw propeller
- Speed: 15.5 knots (28.7 km/h)
- Capacity: 500,000 cu ft (14,158.4 m^{3}) of which 88,000 cu ft (2,491.9 m^{3}) refrigerated
- Crew: 11 officers, 45 sailors, 10 Naval Armed Guardsmen (83 total)
- Armament: unknown, but included 20 mm guns

SS Santa Elisa was a refrigerated cargo ship built for the Grace Line by the United States Maritime Commission, delivered in July 1941 and sunk in August 1942 when Convoy WS 21S carrying supplies to Malta in Operation Pedestal was attacked and scattered.

== Construction and operation ==
Santa Elisa (Note: This was the second ship in the line's ships with the name, the first being Santa Elisa of 1919 (later Baranof). The third was delivered in 1944.) was one of two Maritime Commission type C2 ships modified from the basic design for the Grace Line built by Federal Shipbuilding of Kearny, New Jersey in 1941 as type C2-G. The ships were modified from the basic C2 design for the South American cargo trade and were to be operated on the line's scheduled service between United States Atlantic ports and the West Coast of South America by way of the Panama Canal. The two ships would join two other C2 types already built for the line, Santa Ana and Santa Teresa. The C2-G is a type unique to the Federal Shipbuilding built Santa Elisa and Santa Rita. Of the total 500,000 cu ft (14,158.4 m^{3}) cargo space 88,000 cu ft (2,491.9 m^{3}) was refrigerated.

The ship was completed on 15 July 1941, delivered to Grace Lines and departed the night of 18 July for the Panama Canal for ports in Colombia, Ecuador, Peru and Chile. On 5 May 1942 Santa Elisa was delivered from Grace Lines to the War Shipping Administration (WSA) at New York to continue operation by Grace as WSA's agent under an Army Transportation Corps agreement (TCA).

On 17 January 1942 Santa Elisa sustained hull damage and fires off Atlantic City, New Jersey when the freighter San José, which sank, collided with the larger ship. There were no deaths on either ship.

== Malta convoy and loss ==
The situation on Malta was desperate despite the attempt of two convoys to resupply the island in June 1942 in Operation Harpoon and Operation Vigorous. Of the thirteen merchant ships of the two convoys in mid June only four, two from each convoy, had made port with only 33,000 of 124,000 tons of supplies. The planned relief convoy, heaviy escorted part of the way, required ships capable of sustained speed of no less than 15 kn (17 mph; 28 km/h). The convoy was given a designation of the convoys from Britain by way of the Cape of Good Hope to Suez, WS.5.21.S, as part of the cover for the actual destination and operation which was designated Operation Pedestal. The British had no tanker of the size and speed required but the U.S. Maritime Administration had two tankers, Kentucky and Ohio that did meet the requirement and new U.S. cargo designs also met the cargo ship requirement. Kentucky had previously been bombed and scuttled off Malta so Ohio and the two American cargo ships, the other being Almeria Lykes, were provided in high level agreements. All the cargo ships were allocated loads with a percentage of every commodity so that all would not be lost with a single ship thus all cargo ships had a portion of fuel and ammunition as cargo.

Santa Elisa was with the convoy setting out from Newport, England. After she straggled from the convoy, she was attacked and torpedoed by the Italian motor boats MAS 557 and 564 25 nautical miles (46 km) southeast of Cape Bon, Tunisia on the night of 12/13 August 1942. MAS 557 strafed the vessel with her .51 Breda machine gun, killing four British army gunners, while the second motorboat launched a 450 mm torpedo that struck Santa Elisa on the starboard side near the No. 1 cargo hatch at about 05:17.

The torpedo set fire to the ship's cargo of aviation gasoline with some fires caused by shells and Santa Elisa was abandoned at about 05:22 on 13 August. At the time there were 99 aboard. Ship's officers and crew numbered 56, United States Navy Armed Guard gun crew numbered 10 and there were 33 passengers, apparently the British gun crews. (Note: Ship's company was 11 officers, 3 radiomen and 42 unlicensed; gun crew was 1 officer and 9 men. Embarked British gunners were "passengers.") Three of the Armed Guard enlisted gunners were injured as were two unliscensed ship's crew. Four of the British gunners were lost. The ship sank about 07:22 near position 36°20′N 11°28′E after bombing by enemy aircraft. Survivors were rescued by HMS Penn and landed at Malta.

Francis A. Dales and Frederick A. Larsen Jr. the Junior Third Mate on Santa Elisa were awarded the Merchant Marine Distinguished Service Medal for courage, heroism above and beyond the call of duty for involvement in the convoy. After the Santa Elisa's sinking, Dales and Larsen volunteered to board the damaged tanker Ohio and helped defend it against further attacked until the Ohio reached Malta on 16 August 1942 suspended between the British destroyers Bramham and Penn. The award was given by Admiral Emory S. Land.
