= USS Oberon =

Cargo ship of the United States Navy

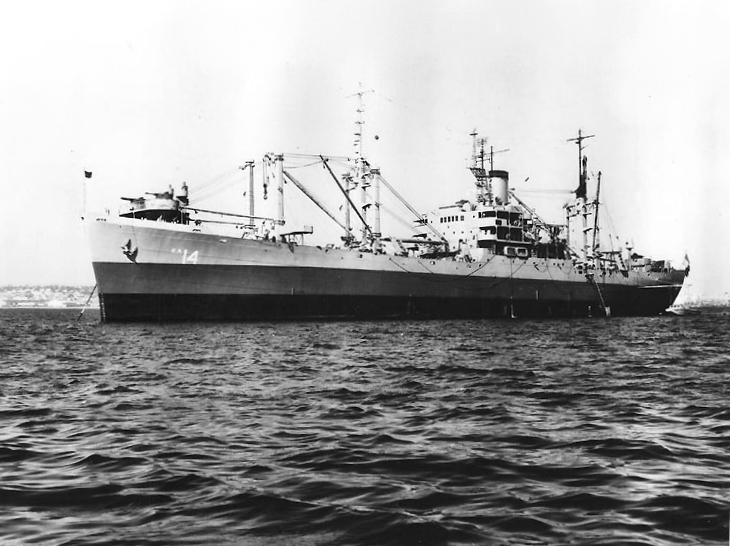
- USS Oberon (AKA-14)

History

United States
- Name: USS Oberon
- Namesake: Oberon, one of the moons of Uranus
- Builder: Federal Shipbuilding and Drydock Company, Kearny, New Jersey
- Laid down: date unknown, as Delalba
- Launched: 18 March 1942
- Acquired: 15 June 1942
- Commissioned: 15 June 1942, as USS Oberon (AK-56)
- Decommissioned: 27 June 1955
- Reclassified: AKA-14 (Attack cargo ship), 1 February 1943; T-AKA-14, 1 October 1949; LKA-14 (Amphibious cargo ship), 1 January 1969
- Stricken: 1 July 1960
- Honours and awards: 6 battle stars (World War II); 5 battle stars (Korea)
- Fate: Sold for scrapping, 3 December 1970

General characteristics
- Class & type: Arcturus-class attack cargo ship
- Type: Type C2-F cargo ship
- Displacement: 7,391 long tons (7,510 t)
- Length: 459 ft 2 in (139.95 m)
- Beam: 63 ft (19 m)
- Draft: 26 ft 5 in (8.05 m)
- Speed: 16.5 knots (30.6 km/h; 19.0 mph)
- Complement: 494
- Armament: 1 × 5"/38 caliber gun mount; 4 × single 40 mm gun mounts; 18 × 20 mm gun mounts

USS Oberon (AK-56/AKA-14/T-AKA-14/LKA-14) was a Arcturus-class attack cargo ship in the United States Navy. She was named after Oberon, one of the moons of the planet Uranus.

Oberon (AK–56), originally named Delalba (MC hull 133), was built at Federal Shipbuilding and Drydock Company, Kearny, New Jersey; renamed Oberon 16 February 1942; launched 18 March 1942; sponsored by Mrs. W. Creighton Peet; acquired by the Navy 15 June 1942, commissioned the same day.

== Service history ==
=== World War II ===
Oberon completed alterations and shakedown before joining a task force steaming to the invasion of North Africa on 24 October 1942. Despite air raids, a submarine attack, and casualties among sister ships, she commenced off-loading supplies on D-Day, 8 November, at Fedhala, French Morocco. Mission accomplished, the cargo ship returned to Hampton Roads, Virginia, on 24 November and began preparations for a Pacific voyage.

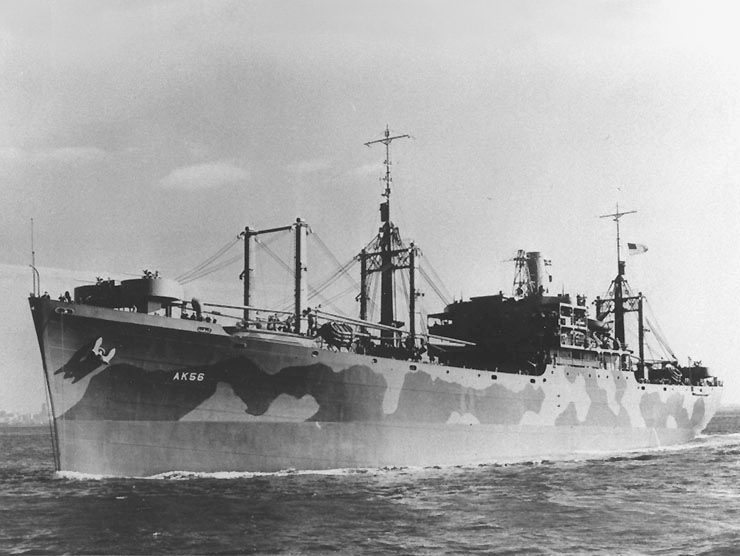
USS Oberon (AK-58) in 1942.

Early in the new year, Oberon transited the Panama Canal; and, while sailing for the South Pacific, was reclassified AKA–14. She discharged her cargo at New Caledonia and the New Hebrides before returning to Norfolk, on 12 March 1943. Completing overhaul Oberon again crossed the Atlantic to the Mediterranean and took station, 10 July, off Gela for the landings on Sicily. Two months later her anti-aircraft batteries again blazed during unloading operations in the difficult invasion of Salerno Bay, Italy. Withdrawn to sail the Oran to Bizerte supply run, Oberon departed the area in December with 120 Army paratroopers and supplies bound for Belfast, Northern Ireland. Later that month an Atlantic storm caused more damage than had enemy actions.

After repairs in the Philadelphia Navy Yard, Oberon returned to North Africa in April via Cardiff, Wales. As part of Assault Group II preparing for the invasion of Southern France she practiced landings until 13 August along both the Algerian and Italian coasts. D-Day, the 15th, went smoothly as she landed 151 soldiers and sailors plus valuable support equipment at St. Tropez, France. After five additional logistic missions from Oran and Naples, the attack transport joined a convoy en route to the United States late in October.

With Germany facing defeat, Oberon was reassigned to the Pacific. Once again she began the new year in transit through the Panama Canal, and then proceeded to Leyte, Philippines arriving on 21 February 1945. With other units of Amphibious Group 7 she helped to take Kerama Retto late in March and joined the attack on Okinawa on 1 April. The appearance of kamikaze planes the next day was a challenging new experience from which Oberon emerged unscathed and with one kill to her credit. She retired on 26 April to the South Pacific and later received news of Japan's capitulation while steaming to the Philippines. With occupation troops from the 81st Division embarked she sailed into port at Aomori, on northern Honshū, on 25 September. After an additional voyage to Yokohama, Oberon turned homeward and late in November reached Seattle, WA.

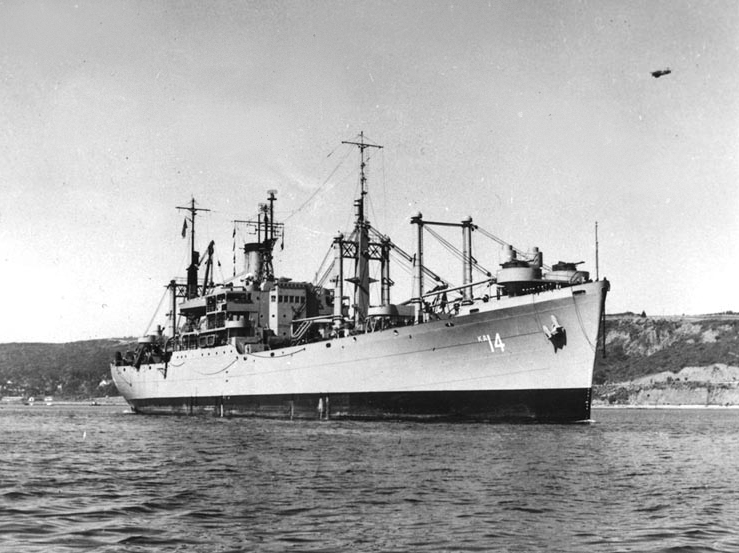
Oberon circa 1950.

=== Korean War ===
In the post-war years, Oberon served with the Navy Transportation Service carrying cargo and personnel between the West Coast and American bases in the Pacific. Incorporated into the Military Sea Transportation Service at its initiation on 1 October 1949, she became an ammunition replenishment vessel during the Korean War. Arriving at Sasebo, Japan, on 15 January 1951, Oberon served in the war zone for seven months. On 9 March she conducted her first rearming-at-sea mission with carriers, and later much of her time was spent shuttling supplies between Sasebo and Wonsan, Korea. A second tour of duty in the war zone occurred during the first five months of 1952.

=== Decommissioning and sale ===
The truce signed at Panmunjom curtailed her assignments. She was decommissioned on 27 June 1955 and was placed in reserve until struck from the Navy List on 1 July 1960. She was transferred to the Maritime Commission, placed in the National Defense Reserve Fleet, and berthed at Olympia, Washington. Reclassified LKA-14 (Amphibious cargo ship) on 1 January 1969, the ship was sold for scrap to Marine Power and Equipment Co. of Seattle, Washington, on 3 December 1970.

Oberon received six battle stars for World War II service and five for duty in Korea.
