= MS Stag Hound (1941) =

History

United States
- Name: Stag Hound
- Owner: United States Lines
- Port of registry: New York
- Builder: Sun Shipbuilding; Chester, PA
- Yard number: 204
- Launched: 18 October 1941
- Completed: September 1942
- Identification: US official number 242113; call sign KFPQ
- Fate: Sunk by Barbarigo, 3 March 1943

General characteristics
- Class & type: Type C2-SU-R
- Tonnage: 6,165 GRT
- Length: 453.3 ft (138.2 m)
- Beam: 63.2 ft (19.3 m)
- Depth: 27.5 ft (8.4 m)
- Decks: 3
- Installed power: 1 × 5-cylinder diesel engine; 870 NHP
- Propulsion: 1 × screw
- Speed: 15.5 knots (28.7 km/h)
- Crew: 10 officers, 49 men, 25 Naval Armed Guardsmen
- Sensors & processing systems: wireless direction finding; echo sounding device; gyrocompass
- Armament: 1 × 5 in (130 mm) gun; 1 × 3 in (76 mm) gun; 6 × 20 mm gun

MS Stag Hound was a Type C2-SU-R refrigerated motor ship built by Sun Shipbuilding for United States Lines. She was sunk by Italian submarine Barbarigo on 3 March 1943. All hands were rescued by an Argentinian ship.

== Career ==
Stag Hound was laid down at Sun Shipbuilding of Chester, Pennsylvania. Built under a United States Maritime Commission contract (MC hull number 116) on behalf of United States Lines of New York, she was launched on 18 October 1941. After Stag Hound's September 1942 completion, she was registered at New York and armed with one 5-inch (130 mm) and one 3-inch (76 mm) deck gun and six machine guns, and took on fourteen Naval Armed Guardsmen to man the guns.

On 28 February 1943, Stag Hound left New York for Rio de Janeiro with a 5,800-long-ton (5,893.072 t) cargo that included dynamite, trucks, gas, and steel. At 19:15 on 3 March, near position 16°44′S 36°33′W, Barbarigo hit Stag Hound with two torpedoes. They destroyed the steering gear and the ship's antenna, and the ship's master, Harold T. McCaw, ordered the fatally damaged ship abandoned. The ship's 10 officers (including McCaw), 49 men, and 25 Naval Armed Guardsmen boarded two lifeboats and one life raft ten minutes after the attack. Barbarigo launched a coup de grâce that hit the still-floating ship, causing her to sink stern-first at 19:50, 35 minutes after the initial attack. After 25 hours in the water, all hands were rescued by the Argentinian steamship Rio Colorado and were landed at Rio de Janeiro on 8 March.
