= SS Santa Rita =

American refrigerated cargo ship

History
- Name: Santa Rita
- Owner: Grace Line
- Operator: Grace Line
- Port of registry: (United States) New York, New York
- Builder: Federal Shipbuilding; Kearny, New Jersey
- Yard number: 228
- Launched: 11 July 1941
- Completed: 17 September 1941
- Identification: U.S. Official #: 240916; Signal: WIKH
- Fate: Sunk, 9 July 1942

General characteristics
- Type: Type C2-G ship
- Tonnage: 8,379 GRT
- Length: 441 ft 3 in (134.49 m)
- Beam: 63 ft 1 in (19.23 m)
- Draft: 37 ft 4 in (11.38 m)
- Decks: three decks
- Propulsion: 2 General Electric steam turbines, geared to a single screw propeller
- Speed: 15.5 knots (28.7 km/h)
- Crew: 8 officers, 44 sailors, 10 Naval Armed Guardsmen (83 total)
- Armament: 1 × 5 in (130 mm) gun; unknown number of .30 cal (7.62 mm) and .50 cal (12.7 mm) machine guns

SS Santa Rita was a refrigerated cargo ship built for the United States Maritime Commission by Federal Shipbuilding of Kearny, New Jersey for delivery to the Grace Line for its east coast of North America to west coast of South America routes in 1941.

The ship operated commercially for Grace from delivery in September 1941 until 23 March 1942 when delivered to the War Shipping Administration which then assigned Grace as its operating agent. Toward the end of a voyage from Port Sudan, Egypt stopping in Cape Town with Charleston, South Carolina as the destination the ship was attacked and sunk by the German submarine U-172 on 9 July.

== Design and construction ==
Santa Rita was one of two Maritime Commission type C2 ships modified from the basic design for the Grace Line built by Federal Shipbuilding of Kearny, New Jersey in 1941 as type C2-G. The ships were modified from the basic C2 design for the South American cargo trade and were to be operated on the line's scheduled service between United States Atlantic ports and the West Coast of South America by way of the Panama Canal. The two ships would join two other C2 types already built for the line, Santa Ana and Santa Teresa. The C2-G is a type unique to the Federal Shipbuilding built Santa Elisa and Santa Rita. Of the total 500,000 cu ft (14,158.4 m^{3}) cargo space 88,000 cu ft (2,491.9 m^{3}) was refrigerated.

Santa Rita, U.S. Official number 240916, signal WIKH, was delivered to Grace Lines on 17 September 1941, operating for the line until 23 March 1942 when delivered to the War Shipping Administration (WSA). WSA assigned the ship to Grace Line to operate the vessel as its agent under an under an Army Transportation Corps agreement (TCA).

== Loss ==
Santa Rita was sailing independently en route from Port Sudan via Cape Town to Charleston, South Carolina with a general cargo, 5000 tons of chrome ore, 100 tons of asbestos and two German tanks secured on deck when attacked and sunk. She was attacked by the German submarine U-172 on 9 July 1942. Steaming on a non-evasive course at 16 knots (30 km/h) 700 nautical miles (1,300 km) northeast of Puerto Rico, a single torpedo from U-172 hit the ship in the near the engine room. The explosion destroyed the engines; opened a 30-foot (9.1 m) hole in the hull of the ship, which immediately flooded the No. 3 cargo hold; and killed one officer and two men. After ten minutes, the ship's master, Henry Stephenson, ordered the ship abandoned; most of the surviving officers and crew and the ship's two passengers had already boarded the Nos. 3 and 4 lifeboats. One lieboat capsized drowning one crewman.

When the ship did not immediately sink, U-172 fired machine gun bursts at the vessel to discourage her crew from returning. The U-boat got off four quick shots with her deck gun that struck Santa Rita's superstructure, but did not finish the ship off. After taking Stephenson prisoner aboard the submarine, crewmen from U-172 boarded Santa Rita and searching the ship finally removing valuables. In a serious lapse in security a chart of the mine defenses off Capetown, despite destruction of other sensitive material, was found and removed. The searchers left scuttling charges which with seven more shots from the deck gun caused the ship to roll over and sink at 15:20 near position 26°11′N 55°40′W. Survivors in two boats were rescued after eight days and those in a third after seventeen days. American destroyers Livermore and Mayo rescued most of the survivors and landed them at Port of Spain, Trinidad, while another boat rescued the rest and took them to Puerto Rico. Stephenson, aged 69, was repatriated to the United States in February 1945. He had been decorated by the War Shipping Administration and Grace Line.
