= USS Mercury (AK-42) =

Cargo ship of the United States Navy

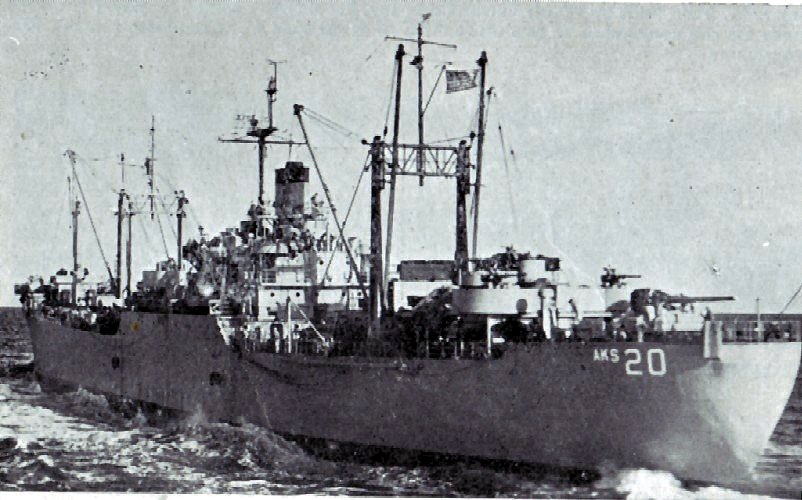

History

United States
- Ordered: as MS Lightning, C2 Cargo hull, MC hull 16
- Laid down: date unknown
- Launched: 15 July 1939
- Acquired: 20 June 1941
- Commissioned: 1 July 1942
- Decommissioned: 28 May 1959
- Stricken: 1 August 1959
- Fate: Scrapped in 1975

General characteristics
- Displacement: 7,345 t.(lt), 10,850 t.(fl)
- Length: 459 ft 2 in (139.95 m)
- Beam: 63 ft (19 m)
- Draft: 25 ft 9 in (7.85 m) (max)
- Propulsion: two boilers, one steam turbine, single shaft, 6,000shp
- Speed: 15.5 kts.
- Complement: 265
- Armament: one 5 in (130 mm) dual purpose gun mount; four single 3 in (76 mm) dual purpose guns; eight single 20 mm AA gun mounts

USS Mercury (AK-42) was a cargo ship commissioned by the U.S. Navy for service in World War II. She was responsible for delivering necessary goods and equipment to ships and stations in the war zone.

== Service career ==
The fifth ship to be named Mercury by the Navy, AK-42 was launched as SS Lightning by Federal Shipbuilding & Dry Dock Go., Kearny, New Jersey, 15 July 1939; sponsored by Mrs. Royal S. Copeland; purchased on the ways by Moore McCormack Lines and placed in operation by them as SS Mormactern 30 October 1940; acquired by the Navy 20 June 1941; converted, and commissioned as Mercury 1 July 1942.

Throughout her World War II service, Mercury operated in the Pacific Ocean, beginning with long runs from the west coast to the South Pacific and ending with underway replenishments for the fast carrier forces. The converted merchantman completed her maiden wartime voyage at San Francisco, California, on 27 September 1942 having carried a mixed cargo, which included drummed petroleum products, landing mats, dynamite, engineering equipment, and food, to Noumea and Guadalcanal. Over the next 15 months she continued to carry essential materiel to the South Pacific, supporting Allied forces as they pushed through the Solomons and the Gilberts.

On 7 January 1944, as plans for the Marshall Islands campaign reached completion, she reported for duty with the U.S. 5th Fleet at Pearl Harbor. Two weeks later, with U.S. Army assault units and combat cargo, she sailed with TG 51.1, the reserve force for Operation Flintlock. Arriving in Kwajalein lagoon 2 February, she remained anchored there, with her passengers and cargo uncommitted, until 15 February, when the island hopping pace was stepped up. The Eniwetok assault date was pushed forward and the Kwajalein Reserve Force became the expeditionary force for Operation Catchpole.

On the 17th, Mercury entered the lagoon of strategic Eniwetok, which would become the temporary naval and air base needed to take the Carolines and Marianas. The cargo ship landed men and supplies on both Engebi Island and Eniwetok Island and then returned to Kwajalein to embark Marine casualties for transportation back to the United States.

Arriving at San Francisco 17 March, Mercury underwent overhaul and then resumed cargo runs between Pearl Harbor and the U.S. West Coast and among the Hawaiian Islands. On 7 June she was underway once more for the war zone, anchoring south of Garapan, Saipan, on the 26th. Less than 5 hours later, at 2131, a Japanese bomber came through the smokescreen at an altitude of about 92 feet and headed for the ship's superstructure. The plane's torpedo hit the amidships living compartments on the port boat deck and continued on, breaking in two without detonating. The torpedo's main body was found in the 1st lieutenant's room and its fuse was located in the engine room, while the explosive components (TNT) of its warhead were spread over the port boat and bridge decks. The plane itself fell victim to the after starboard boom which stood passively in the enemy's path, knocking the plane out of control upon collision and causing it to crash 500 yards off the starboard quarter.

Following repairs at Pearl Harbor, Mercury returned to the western Pacific. She arrived at Manus 3 October and 5 days later became a unit of the U.S. 7th Fleet as task force TF 33 became TF 79 for the reconquest of the Philippines. On the 14th, with Army assault personnel again embarked, she sailed for Leyte Gulf. A week later she discharged her cargo and passengers off the Dulag beachhead and then sailed for Hollandia. Through November and into December she carried reinforcements to Leyte from New Guinea and the Admiralties.

On 30 December she became underway for another invasion, this time Luzon. Arriving in Lingayen Gulf 9 January 1945, she unloaded in 2 days and returned to Leyte to embark units of the 38th Infantry Division, assigned to cut off a Japanese retreat into the Bataan Peninsula. Completing the mission off the coast of Zambales Province 29 January, she steamed for Ulithi, joined ServRon 10, and underwent alterations to enable her to transfer cargo at sea. On 26 February she completed her first such operation and for the next 51 days remained at sea replenishing the fast carriers off Okinawa. She then proceeded to San Francisco, California, arriving 12 June for conversion to a store-issues ship. She was reclassified AKS 20, 31 July and completed conversion in September 1945.

Detached from the U.S. Pacific Fleet, Mercury sailed from San Francisco 12 October and transited the Panama Canal to begin operations with Service Force, Atlantic fleet. For the next 4 years she plied between the United States and Europe, supporting ashore and afloat units of naval forces, eastern Atlantic Ocean and Mediterranean. In 1950 she began operating with the 6th Fleet in the Mediterranean as the on station fleet issue ship with Underway Support Group, alternating tours in that role with USS Altair (AKS-32). Arriving at Norfolk, Virginia, 16 October 1958, she completed her last mission in that capacity, a 10-month tour during which she set records for underway transfer rates while supporting the 6th Fleet during the Lebanon crisis.

Mercury remained at Norfolk until March 1959 when she steamed to Orange, Texas. There she decommissioned 28 May. Struck from the Naval Register 1 August 1959, she was transferred to the Maritime Administration 5 April 1960. She entered the National Defense Reserve Fleet in February 1961 and was berthed in Beaumont, Texas, in 1969.

== Military awards and honors ==
Mercury received five battle stars for World War II service:

- Capture and defense of Guadalcanal
- Marshall Islands operation
- Marianas operation
- Leyte operation
- Luzon operation

Her crew was eligible for the following medals:

- Combat Action Ribbon (retroactive 26 June 1944)
- American Campaign Medal
- Asiatic-Pacific Campaign Medal (5 stars)
- World War II Victory Medal
- National Defense Service Medal
- Armed Forces Expeditionary Medal (3-Lebanon)
