= Pacific Reserve Fleet, Olympia =

Former US Reserve Fleet installation

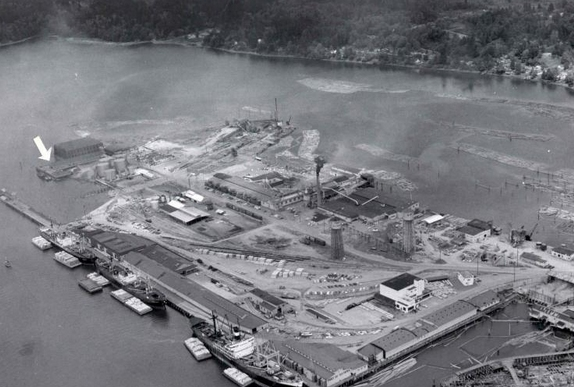
Pacific Reserve Fleet, Olympia in 1952

Pacific Reserve Fleet, Olympia was part of the United States Navy reserve fleets in Budd Inlet in Puget Sound off North Olympia, Washington at 47.099178°N 122.894769°W. The Reserve Fleet was opened in 1946 to store the many surplus ships after World War II. The mothball fleet was mostly cargo ships used in the merchant marine navy. When opened is had 95 ships, mostly cargo ships, but also troop ships and oil tankers. Shore power was wired to the ships to keep them operational. Some ships there were reactivated for Korean War and Vietnam War. After the Korean War 185 ships were mothballed at the fleet. The fleet was also used to store the United States' surplus wheat in 47 ships starting in 1954. Pacific Reserve Fleet, Olympia closed in 1972, the last 29 ships in the fleet were removed, all but 4 were scrapped.

A Marking near the site reads:

In recognition of the Olympia National Defense reserve Fleet here in Budd Inlet from March 1946 to June 1972 lay many gallant ships. When not at rest, they and their brave crews served the commerce and security of America and her friends abroad in the Second World War and in later times of Crises.

== See also ==
- Puget Sound Naval Shipyard
- Washington State Capitol
