= USS Aldebaran =

US Navy combat stores ship

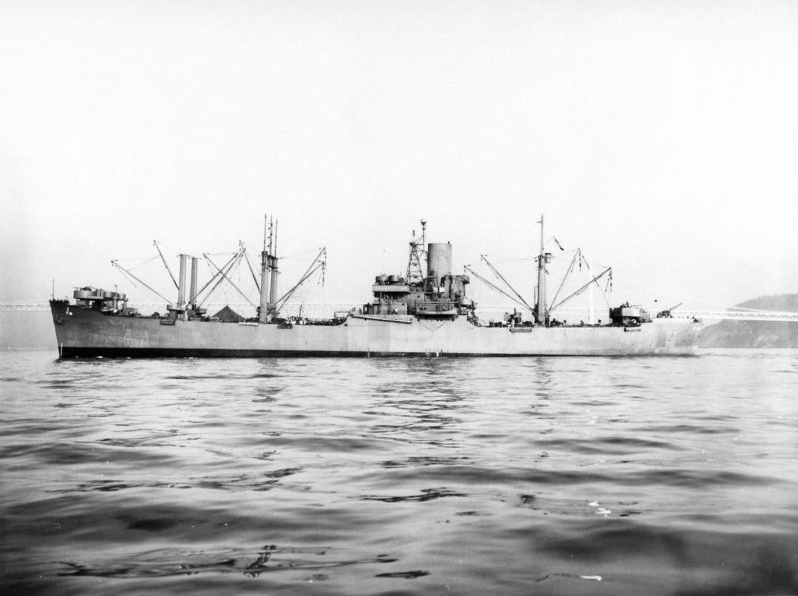
- USS Aldebaran (AF-10)

History

United States
- Name: Stag Hound (1940); Aldebaran (1940-1974)
- Namesake: Stag Hound; Aldebaran
- Operator: Grace Lines (1940); U.S. Navy (1940-1968)
- Builder: Newport News Shipbuilding & Drydock Co.
- Yard number: 374
- Laid down: 28 November 1938
- Launched: 21 June 1939
- Acquired: 22 December 1940
- Commissioned: 10 January 1941
- Decommissioned: 28 June 1968
- Stricken: 1 June 1973
- Fate: Sold for scrap, 14 November 1974

General characteristics
- Tonnage: 7,169 GRT, 9,493 DWT
- Displacement: 13,910 tons
- Length: 459 ft 3 in (139.98 m)
- Beam: 63 ft (19 m)
- Draught: 25 ft 10 in (7.87 m)
- Installed power: 2 Babcock & Wilcox boilers
- Propulsion: Newport News Shipbuilding & Drydock Co. trubine, Westinghouse double reduction gear set
- Speed: 16.4 knots
- Complement: 287
- Armament: 1 × 5 in (130 mm), 4 × 3 in (76 mm)

USS Aldebaran (AF-10), the lead ship of her class of stores ship is the only ship of the United States Navy to have this name. She is named after Aldebaran, a star of the first magnitude in the constellation Taurus.

== Construction and commercial service ==
Originally the SS Stag Hound was laid down on 28 November 1938 at Newport News, Virginia, by the Newport News Shipbuilding & Drydock Co. under a United States Maritime Commission (MC) contract (MC hull 27, Yard hull 374); launched on 21 June 1939; sponsored by Mrs. Martha Macy Hill; and delivered to the on 4 December 1939. The ship was one of three C-2 type ships, all named for famous American sailing ships, purchased or chartered by Grace Lines for service between United States Pacific coast ports and the west coast of South America. Stag Hound was the first of the three, Red Jacket and Flying Cloud to follow, for Grace and the first of the type to arrive on the West Coast arriving at San Francisco on 9 April and delivered by the MC to Grace Lines on 19 April 1940.

In commercial configuration the ship was 7,169 GRT, Navy shows 13,910 ton displacement, 9,493 DWT, 459 ft 3 in (140.0 m) length overall, 435 ft (132.6 m) length between perpendiculars, 63 ft (19.2 m) beam with loaded draft of 25 ft 10 in (7.9 m). The ship had 3,288 cubic feet (93.1 m^{3}) refrigerated capacity in addition to regular cargo capacity. Power was furnished by two Babcock & Wilcox boilers driving a Newport News Shipbuilding & Drydock Co. trubine through a Westinghouse double reduction gear set. A single four-bladed propeller, 19 ft (5.8 m) in diameter, provided a loaded sea speed of 15.5 kn (17.8 mph; 28.7 km/h).

== Navy acquisition ==
The cargo ship served with Grace Lines for a year before the Navy purchased her on 22 December 1940. Renamed Aldebaran, classified a stores ship, and designated AF-10, she was placed in commission, in ordinary, on 26 December 1940 and was placed in full commission at San Francisco on 14 January 1941.

== History ==
=== World War II ===
The stores ship embarked upon her first Navy mission on 26 January 1941, departing from San Francisco on a round-trip voyage via Pearl Harbor to Pago Pago, Samoa. Following her maiden mission for the Navy, Aldebaran remained at San Francisco until 29 March when she put to sea with a cargo bound for Hawaii. The ship made a seven-day layover at Pearl Harbor between 5 and 12 April and returned to San Francisco on the 18th. Upon her arrival back on the west coast, she entered a civilian drydock at Oakland, California, to begin conversion to a fleet provisioning ship. Major modifications were completed by 21 October, and finishing touches were added over the next three weeks. On 14 November, Aldebaran departed San Francisco on her way to San Diego. Following a three-day stay at that port between 16 and 19 November, she got underway for Hawaii. The ship discharged cargo at Pearl Harbor during the last six days of November and, after an overnight stop at Maui, headed back to the west coast on 1 December. Aldebaran arrived at San Francisco on the 6th. On the following morning, the Japanese attacked Pearl Harbor and plunged the United States into World War II.

The ship embarked upon her first wartime voyage on 17 December. Over the next six months, Aldebaran completed four round-trip runs carrying provisions and passengers between San Francisco and Hawaii. She concluded the fourth of those Pearl Harbor shuttle assignments at San Francisco on 6 June 1942.

Her next assignment took the ship beyond Hawaii to the South Pacific. She stood out of San Francisco on 23 June, stopped at Pearl Harbor early in July, and then spent the remainder of the summer of 1942 making calls at ports on the South Pacific circuit. Aldebaran visited Samoa, Tongatapu, New Caledonia, and Espiritu Santo before returning to San Francisco on 23 September. That first wartime series of port calls in the South Pacific established a pattern of operations for her that endured through the next 20 months. Aldebaran loaded cargo at San Francisco and then embarked upon long, circuitous voyages that took her back to New Caledonia, Samoa, and Espiritu Santo.

In May 1944 the USS Aldebaran was diverted to Hawaii during the run back to the west coast from Espiritu Santo to load cargo bound for the Central Pacific. She arrived in Pearl Harbor on 24 May, took on her cargo, and returned to sea on the 29th. The ship entered Kwajalein Atoll in the Marshall Islands on 5 June and spent six days issuing fresh and frozen provisions to ships about to assault the Mariana Islands. She headed back to Pearl Harbor on 12 June and stood into that port on the 18th. Aldebaran spent the next nine months carrying provisions to ships at forward bases in the Marshalls and Carolines, with command of the ship in control of Commander Samuel Lovell Moore Cole in December 1944. Her most frequent ports of call were Eniwetok in the Marshalls and Ulithi in the Carolines; however, she made one visit each to Kwajalein in the Marshalls, Manus in the Admiralty Islands, and Guam in the Marianas. At the conclusion of each supply mission, she returned to either Pearl Harbor or San Francisco to load additional cargo.

On 29 March 1945, Aldebaran arrived in San Francisco to complete the last of her resupply missions to ships in the anchorages in the Central Pacific atolls. On 10 April, she departed San Francisco for Pearl Harbor where she spent the period 16 to 21 April fitting out for a new mission, replenishing the fast carriers and their screens at sea. Aldebaran stood out of Pearl Harbor on the 21st and arrived in Ulithi on 2 May. There, she reported for duty with Task Unit (TU) 50.8.5, part of the underway replenishment group. She departed Ulithi in company with TU 50.8.5 on May and joined the rest of Task Group (TG) 50.8 at sea. The stores ship spent about five weeks at sea replenishing the warships engaged in the Okinawa campaign before putting in at Guam on 13 June to reload. For the remaining two months of hostilities, Aldebaran provided logistics support for the carrier task groups making air strikes on the Japanese home islands, returning periodically to either Guam or Ulithi to restock her larder.

=== Cold War ===
Hostilities ceased on 15 August 1945, but Aldebaran continued replenishment-at-sea operations during the initial stages of the occupation of Japan. She was present to Tokyo Bay on 2 September 1945 when Japanese officials signed the surrender document on board Missouri (BB-63). For the remainder of 1945, Aldebaran provided logistics support for forces occupying Japan and her former conquests. On 17 January 1946, the stores ship departed Taku, China, on her way back to the United States. She arrived in Seattle, Washington, on 31 January and entered the Puget Sound Naval Shipyard a week later for a two-month repair period.

Aldebaran returned to Seattle on 6 April and began preparations for her last voyage to the Far East. On 22 April, she put to sea bound for Japan. The ship reached Yokosuka on 8 May and, from there, continued on to Tsingtao, China, and Okinawa. On 15 June, Aldebaran departed Okinawa to return to the United States. Her ultimate destination was the east coast. After a stop at San Pedro, California, she resumed her voyage, transited the Panama Canal, and arrived at Bayonne, New Jersey, on 18 July.

After a voyage to North Africa and western Europe in August and September, Aldebaran settled into a routine of operations along the east coast punctuated by voyages to the West Indies to provide logistics support to bases and ships in that region and to participate in exercises. Such pursuits occupied her time for almost 19 months, until the beginning of June 1948. On the 4th, she stood out of Chesapeake Bay to embark upon the first of many missions to the Mediterranean Sea.

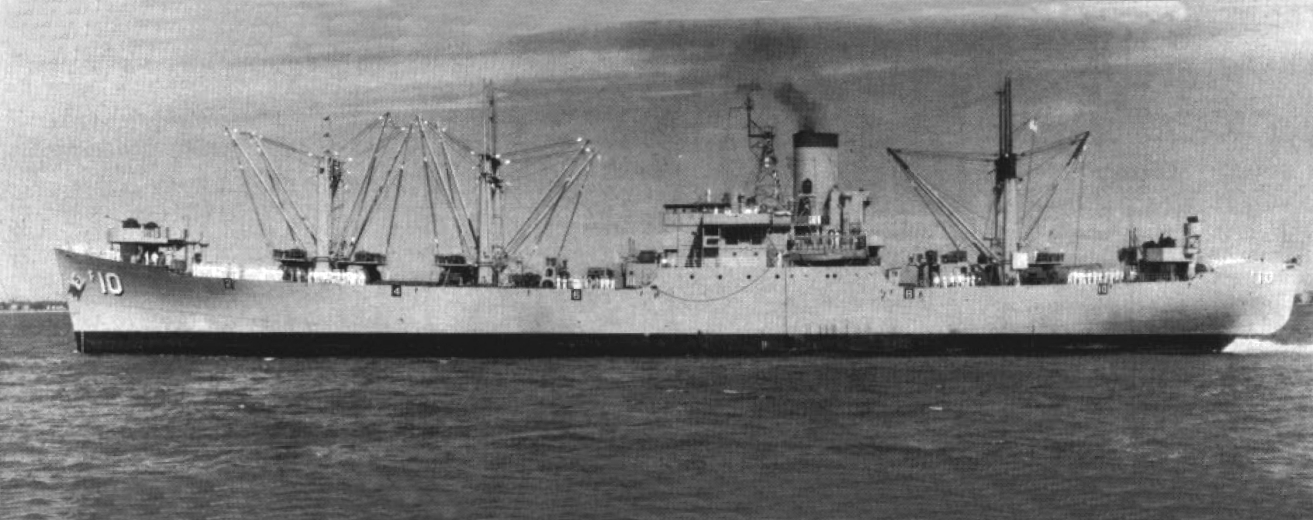
USS Aldebaran (AF-10) in 1960.

For the next two decades, Aldebaran alternated between assignments to the Mediterranean Sea and operations in the western Atlantic. Unlike most other ships attached to the 6th Fleet, she did not normally serve extended periods of time in the Mediterranean. Instead, her cruises tended to be about six to ten weeks in duration, and she generally made two or three of them a year. She would remain in the Mediterranean as long as she retained a sufficient stock of provisions for issue. When those stocks began to run low, Aldebaran. returned to the United States. Turnaround time at home varied. Scheduled overhauls meant extended periods in the United States. In addition, other resupply missions, such as to forces operating in the West Indies, replaced voyages to the Mediterranean on her schedule. Occasional interludes in northern European waters also varied Aldebaran's itinerary.

Twice during her postwar career, Aldebaran participated in operations for which she received the Armed Forces Expeditionary Medal. During the summer of 1958, the United States landed marines in Lebanon to help restore domestic order in that country. The stores ship got underway from Norfolk just four days after the landings to provide logistics services to the ships supporting those troops. Four years later, in the fall of 1962, President John F. Kennedy surrounded the island of Cuba with a cordon of warships to stop the flow of Soviet missiles to that island and to force the removal of those already in place. Aldebaran's at-sea replenishment capabilities helped those ships maintain a constant vigil thereby contributing to the successful conclusion of the matter.

Aldebaran continued her active service to United States naval forces in the Mediterranean Sea and in the West Indies until mid-1968. On 28 June 1968, she was placed out of commission at Norfolk. Four months later, on 29 October, Aldebaran was transferred to the Maritime Administration to be berthed with the National Defense Reserve Fleet at James River, Virginia. That transfer was made permanent on 30 June 1969. Aldebaran's name was struck from the Navy list on 1 June 1973, and she was sold on 14 November 1974 to Andy International, Brownsville, Texas, for scrapping.

Aldebaran was awarded two battle stars during World War II.

== Popular culture ==
The USS Aldebaran was featured as a ship in the Japanese yuri manga Kurogane Pukapuka-tai, which is about an all-female crew of IJN sailors during World War 2.
