= List of ships named on the Tower Hill Memorial =

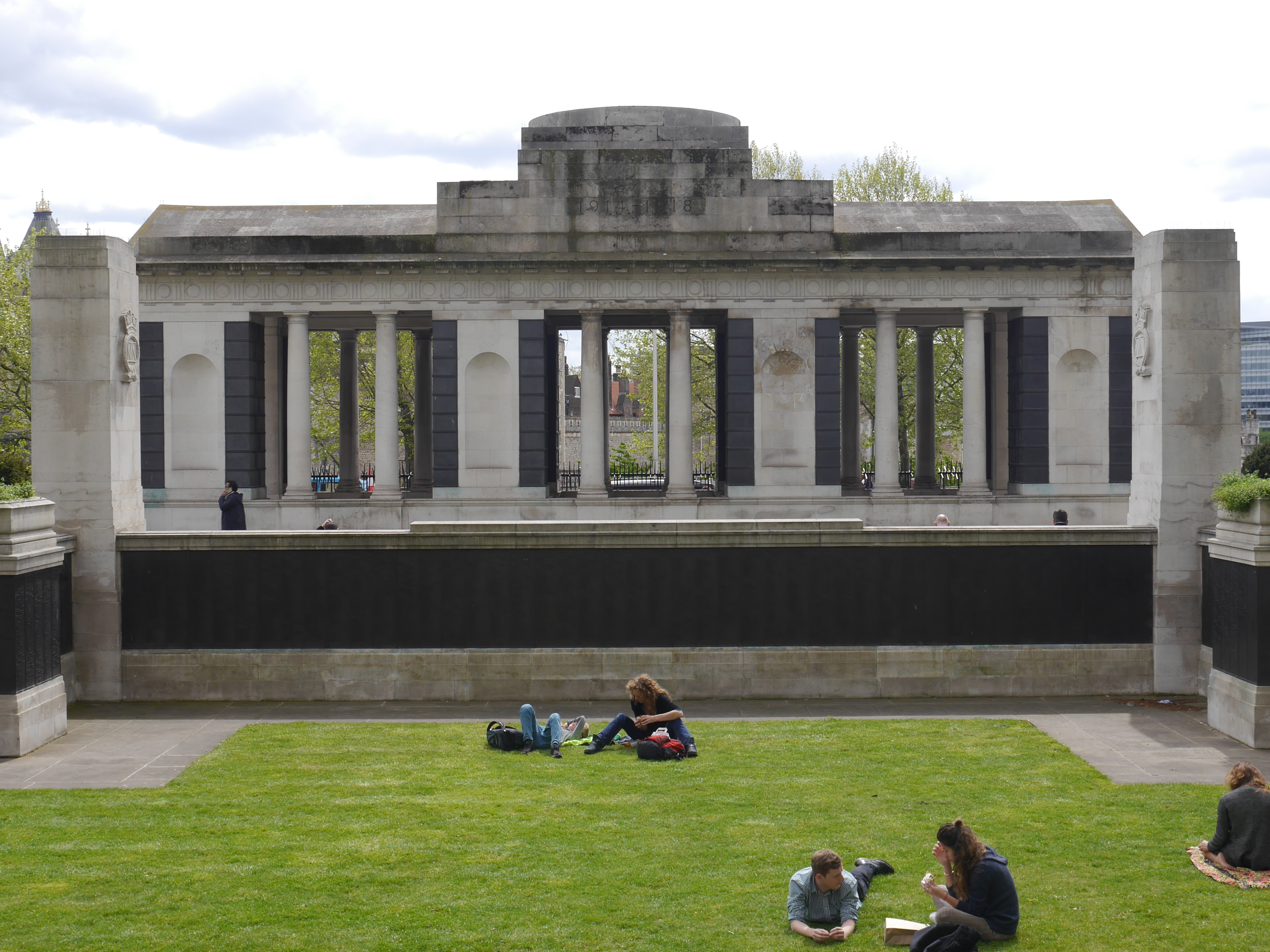
The Tower Hill Memorial comprises two adjacent memorials. Those merchant seafarers who lost their lives in World War II are commemorated on the walls of the sunken garden in the foreground while those who died in World War I are listed on the walls of the pavilion in the background.

The Tower Hill Memorial in London is a pair of Commonwealth War Graves Commission memorials commemorating 36,087 civilian merchant seamen who were lost at sea in the First and Second World Wars.

During the First World War, 3,305 merchant ships were sunk with a total of around 17,000 crew and personnel lost. In the Second World War, 4,786 merchant ships were sunk with a total of around 32,000 crew and personnel lost. Not all these ship losses are named on this memorial, as some ships were sunk or captured with no casualties. One example is MV Cape of Good Hope where all the crew survived in two lifeboats. Similarly, some of those named on the memorial died in incidents or battles where the ship was not lost.

The dead are listed by the ships they served on. Although many of the ships listed on the memorial were sunk, the loss of the ship is not necessary for it to be listed—the memorial commemorates members of the British Merchant Navy who died as a result of enemy action and who have no known grave. Those with known graves are not commemorated here, nor are the missing that served in other organisations (such as the gunners manning defensively equipped merchant ships), or those listed on other memorials to missing merchant seafarers (such as the memorials to the missing of the Indian Merchant Navy). Crew members lost when hospital ships were targeted are included here (see list of hospital ships sunk in World War I and list of hospital ships sunk in World War II). As well as cargo ships, a number of ocean liners were chartered or requisitioned and used to transport troops and cargo during the war.

It is possible for a ship to be listed under different names, such as MV Domala which is listed for 17 of the 108 casualties sustained on 2 March 1940, but is also listed as SS Empire Attendant after it was repaired, rebuilt, and renamed before being torpedoed on 15 July 1942 with the loss of all hands (the 50 crew listed on this memorial and 9 DEMS gunners). Similarly, the listings for SS Inanda and SS Empire Explorer refer to the same ship, repaired, renamed and later sunk.

There are 24 sections of name panels on the First World War memorial and 132 name panels on the Second World War memorial, with the ships of the mercantile marine (later merchant navy) and fishing fleets listed separately. The largest losses of merchant seamen in single shipwrecks commemorated on these memorials are RMS Lusitania in the First World War and SS Ceramic in the Second World War.

== First World War ==
Over 1400 ships are named on the memorial; this list links to those ships that have articles.

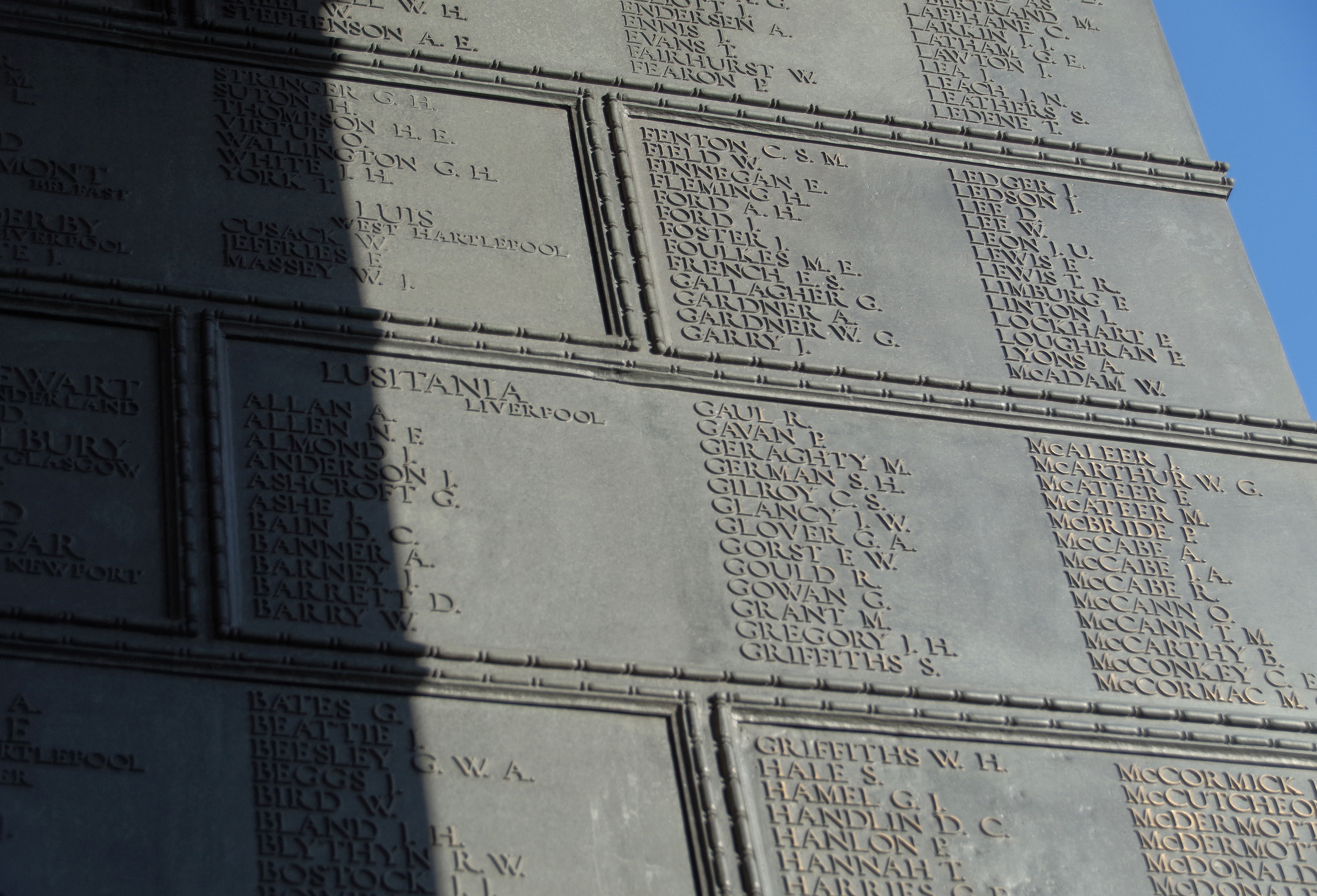
RMS Lusitania is the largest single loss of life commemorated on the World War I memorial

Those named on the First World War memorial include Antarctic explorer Alfred Cheetham who was serving on SS Prunelle, footballer Bobby Atherton who was serving on SS Britannia, and Archibald Bisset Smith the captain of SS Otaki (sunk in the action of 10 March 1917) who was posthumously promoted and awarded the Victoria Cross.

- SS Afric
- SS Aguila (1909)
- RMS Alaunia (1913)
- RMS Andania (1913)
- HMHS Anglia
- RMS Arabia
- SS Arabic (1902)
- HMT Aragon
- SS Arcadian
- SS Armenian
- HMHS Asturias
- SS Athenia (1903)
- RMS Aurania (1916)
- SS Belgian Prince
- HMAS Berrima
- HMT Boorara (see SS Pfalz (1913))
- HMHS Britannic
- SS Caledonia (1904)
- SS California (1907)
- SS Californian
- SS Cameronia (1911)
- RMS Carpathia
- SS Clan Alpine (1899)
- SS Copenhagen (1907)
- SS Cymric
- SS Delphic (1897)
- SS Denebola
- SS Devonian (1900)
- SS Donegal
- HMHS Dover Castle
- SS Dwinsk
- SS Eastfield
- SS Falaba
- RMS Franconia (1910)
- SS Franz Fischer
- SS Georgic (1895)
- HMHS Glenart Castle
- SS Glenartney (1911)
- SS Haverford
- HMHS Huntley (see Ophelia)
- SS Huntsend
- SS Iberian (1900)
- SS Inkosi (1902)
- SS Ivernia
- SS Justicia
- RMS Laconia (1911)
- HMHS Lanfranc
- SS Lapland
- RMS Leinster
- HMHS Llandovery Castle
- RMS Lusitania
- SS Malakand (1905)
- SS Maloja
- RMS Medina (1911)
- SS Minnehaha
- SS Moresby (1881)
- SS Mount Temple
- SS Omrah
- SS Orsova (1908)
- SS Persia (1900)
- SS Prunelle (1874)
- SS Rotorua (1910)
- HMT Royal Edward
- SS Sagamore (1892)
- SS Saint Ninian
- SS Southland (see SS Vaderland (1900))
- SS Torrington
- SS Transylvania (1914)
- SS Tuscania (1914)
- SS Ultonia
- SS Unity
- SS War Baron
- HMAT Warilda
- SS Wimmera

== Second World War ==
Over 2100 ships are named on the memorial; this list links to those ships that have articles.

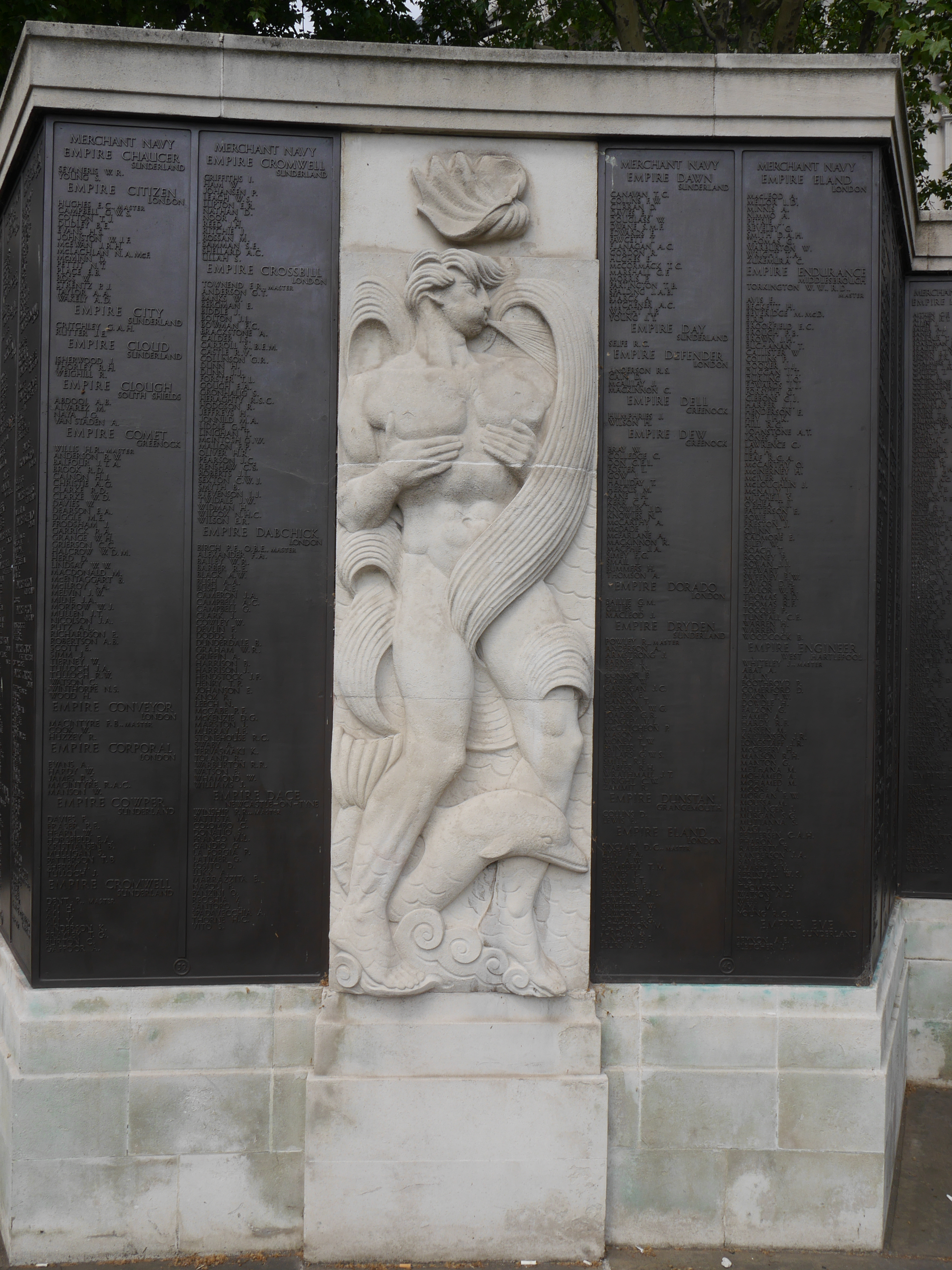
Those commemorated on the Second World War memorial are listed in alphabetical order by ship and branch of service, panels 39 and 40 illustrated here begin with SS Empire Chaucer and conclude with SS Empire Eve

Those listed on the Second World War memorial include Donald Clarke who served on SS San Emiliano and was posthumously awarded both the George Cross and the Lloyd's War Medal for Bravery at Sea.

The entries marked with an asterisk (*) appear on the memorial on the final panels, which have been used to add additional names over the years since the initial unveiling. Empire Blanda is an example of a ship that appears twice on the memorial, once for its initial listing and once for additional names.

- MV Abosso
- SS Abukir
- SS Aguila (1916)
- SS Algarve (1921)
- SS Anglo Saxon (1929)
- MV Anshun (1930)
- SS Albert C. Field
- SS Almeda Star
- SS Amsterdam (1930)
- SS Anselm (1935)
- SS Arandora Star
- SS Archangel (see SS St Petersburg)
- RMS Arundel Castle
- SS Assyrian (1914)
- MV Atheltemplar
- SS Athenia (1922)
- SS Automedon
- SS Avila Star
- SS Avoceta
- SS Avondale Park
- SS Beaverford
- SS Bengore Head
- SS Black Osprey
- SS Box Hill (see SS Glentworth)
- SS Britannia (1925)
- SS British Chivalry
- SS British Consul
- SS British Premier
- MV British Prudence
- SS Calabria (1922)
- SS California (1923)
- SS Cambridge (1916)
- RMS Cameronia (1919)
- SS Canonesa
- SS Carsbreck
- RMS Carthage
- SS Ceramic
- MS Chrobry
- SS Chulmleigh
- SS City of Bedford
- SS City of Benares
- SS City of Cairo
- SS Clan Forbes (1938)
- SS Clan Fraser (1938)
- SS Clan Macarthur
- SS Clan Macfadyen (1923)
- SS Clan Macwhirter (1918)
- SS Clearton
- SS Corduff
- SS Corinaldo
- SS Corinthic (1924)
- SS Corvus (1920)
- SS Creekirk
- SS Dalfram
- RFA Darkdale
- MV Derrycunihy (1943)
- MV Domala (also listed as SS Empire Attendant)
- MV Dumana
- MV Dunedin Star
- MS Dunnottar Castle
- SS Eaglescliffe Hall
- MV El Argentino
- SS El Occidente
- SS Empire Ability (see SS Uhenfels)
- SS Empire Adventure
- SS Empire Airman (see SMS Teodo)
- SS Empire Amethyst
- SS Empire Arnold
- SS Empire Attendant (see MV Domala)
- SS Empire Avocet (see SS Cotati)
- SS Empire Baffin
- SS Empire Barracuda
- SS Empire Beatrice
- SS Empire Beaumont
- MV Empire Bede
- SS Empire Bell
- SS Empire Bison
- SS Empire Blanda (*)
- SS Empire Bowman
- SS Empire Breeze
- SS Empire Brigade
- SS Empire Broadsword
- SS Empire Brutus
- SS Empire Buffalo
- SS Empire Burton
- SS Empire Byron
- SS Empire Cabot
- SS Empire Caribou
- SS Empire Celt
- SS Empire Chaucer
- SS Empire Citizen (see SS Wahehe (1922))
- MV Empire City
- SS Empire Cloud
- SS Empire Clough
- MV Empire Comet
- SS Empire Conveyor
- SS Empire Corporal (see SS British Corporal)
- SS Empire Cowper
- SS Empire Cromwell
- SS Empire Crossbill
- SS Empire Dabchick
- HMS Empire Dace
- MV Empire Dawn
- MV Empire Day
- SS Empire Defender
- SS Empire Dell
- SS Empire Dew
- SS Empire Dorado
- SS Empire Dryden
- SS Empire Dunstan
- SS Empire Eland
- SS Empire Endurance
- SS Empire Engineer
- SS Empire Eve
- SS Empire Explorer
- SS Empire Florizel
- SS Empire Forest (see SS Clan Allan)
- SS Empire Frost
- SS Empire Fusilier
- SS Empire Guillemot (see SS West Caddoa)
- SS Empire Javelin
- SS Empire Kestrel
- SS Empire Leopard (see USS West Haven (ID-2159))
- SS Empire Miniver
- SS Empire Morn
- SS Empire Seal (see MV Californian (1921))
- SS Empire Springbuck (see USS West Mead (ID-3550))
- MV Empire Star (1935)
- SS Empire Tower
- SS Wildebeeste (see USS West Ekonk (ID-3313))
- SS English Trader
- SS Erinpura
- SS Fenella (1936)
- SS Fingal (1923)
- SS Fiscus
- SS Florian
- SS Flynderborg (1930)
- SS Fort Athabaska
- SS Fort La Montee
- SS Fort Stikine
- SS Gairsoppa
- SS Gasfire
- MV Georgic (1931) (*)
- SS Goodleigh (1928)
- HMHS Gloucester Castle
- MV Harpa
- SS Hartlebury
- SS Hektoria (see SS Medic)
- MV Henry Stanley
- SS Hobbema (see USS West Lianga (ID-2758))
- SS Hoihow
- MV Imperial Transport
- SS Inanda (see SS Empire Explorer)
- SS Jumna
- SS Khedive Ismail
- SS Kingston Hill
- RMS Laconia (1921)
- RMS Lancastria
- SS Llanashe
- MV Llangibby Castle
- SS Lulworth Hill
- SS Malakand (1919)
- SS Mareeba (*)
- SS Marietta E
- RMS Mauretania (1938)
- MV Melbourne Star (1936)
- SS Mersey
- SS Michael E
- SS Mill Hill (see SS Gracechurch)
- SS Miraflores
- SS Mohamed Ali El-Kebir
- SS Nailsea Court (1936)
- SS Nailsea Meadow
- SS Nerissa (1926)
- HMHS Newfoundland
- SS Norhauk
- MV Nottingham (1941)
- RMS Nova Scotia (1926)
- SS Orcades (1936)
- SS Oropesa
- SS Pedernales
- SS Peleus
- SS Pennington Court
- SS Pink Star
- SS Port Nicholson (1918)
- SS Primrose Hill
- MV Putney Hill
- RMS Queen Elizabeth (*)
- RMS Queen Mary
- SS Ranchi
- MS Rangitane (1929)
- SS River Afton
- HMT Rohna
- SS Sagaing
- MV San Demetrio
- SS Sauternes
- TSS Scotia (1920)
- RMS Scythia
- MV Seaforth (1938)
- SS Shuntien (1934)
- SS Slamat
- SS Sneland I
- SS Soesterberg (*)
- SS St. Elwyn
- SS Stanbrook
- MV Stirling Castle
- SS Storaa
- RMS Strathaird
- SS Tamaroa (see SS Sophocles (1921))
- SS Testbank
- SS Thistlegorm
- SS Thurso
- SS Tiberton
- SS Timothy Pickering
- SS Tjisalak
- MV Tower Grange
- SS Tregarthen
- SS Tregenna
- MV Tulagi
- SS Umona
- SS Vojvoda Putnik (see SS Kerry Range)
- SS Volo
- MV Waimarama
- MV Walmer Castle (1936)
- SS Western Chief (see USS Western Chief (ID-3161))
- SS Wilhelmina (see USS Wilhelmina (ID-2168))
- RMS Windsor Castle (1922)
- SS Yoma

== See also ==
- U-boat Campaign (World War I)
- British merchant seamen of World War II
