= SS Clearpool =

List of ships with the same or similar names.

Clearpool was the name of three ships operated by Sir R Ropner & Sons Ltd.

- SS Clearpool (1907), a 4,237 GRT cargo ship launched in 1907 and scrapped in 1933.
- SS Clearpool (1935), a 5,404 GRT cargo ship launched in 1935 and wrecked on the Skitter Sands in 1944
- SS Clearpool (1941), a 6,715 GRT cargo ship launched in 1941 as Empire Cabot. Managed by Ropner's from 1942, and bought by them in 1945.In service with Ropner's until 1955.
