= SS Inkosi =

Inkosi was the name of two steamships operated by T & J Harrison Ltd

- SS Inkosi (1902), torpedoed and sunk in 1918, three firemen killed in the engine room.
- SS Inkosi (1937), bombed and sunk in 1940, salvaged as Empire Chivalry
