= SS Empire Frost =

World War II merchant ship of the United Kingdom

History

United Kingdom
- Name: Empire Frost
- Owner: Ministry of War Transport
- Operator: G Heyn & Sons Ltd
- Port of registry: Greenock
- Builder: Lithgows
- Yard number: 939
- Launched: 2 September 1940
- Completed: December 1940
- Maiden voyage: 11 January 1941
- Out of service: 13 March 1941
- Identification: United Kingdom Official Number 166992
- Fate: Bombed and sunk

General characteristics
- Type: Cargo ship
- Tonnage: 7,005 GRT; 5,129 NRT
- Length: 432 ft 2 in (131.72 m) overall
- Beam: 56 ft 1 in (17.09 m)
- Depth: 34 ft 2 in (10.41 m)
- Installed power: Triple expansion steam engine
- Propulsion: Single screw propeller

Location where Empire Frost was bombed and sunk

Empire Frost was a 7,005 GRT cargo ship which was built in 1940 by Lithgows, Port Glasgow for the Ministry of War Transport. She was bombed and sunk in St Georges Channel on 13 March 1941 on the return leg of her maiden voyage.

== Description ==
The ship was 432 ft 2 in (131.72 m) overall, with a beam of 56 ft 2 in (17.12 m). She had a depth of 34 ft 2 in (10.41 m). She was assessed at 7,005 GRT, 5,129 NRT,.

The ship was propelled by a triple expansion steam engine.The engine was built by Rankine & Blackmore, Greenock. It drove a single screw propeller.

== History ==
The ship was built as yard number 939 by Lithgows, Port Glasgow for the Ministry of War Transport. She was launched on 2 September 1940 and completed on December. Empire Frost was allocated the United Kingdom Official Number 166992. Her port of registry was Greenock and she was operated under the management of G Heyn & Sons Ltd, Greenock.

Empire Frost departed from the Clyde on 11 January 1941 on her maiden voyage. She joined Convoy OB 272, which had departed from Liverpool the previous day and dispersed at sea on 14 January. Her destination was Baltimore, Maryland, United States where she arrived on 30 January. She loaded a cargo of wheat, and sailed on 11 February for Halifax, Nova Scotia, Canada, arriving on 16 February. She departed on 18 February with Convoy SC 23, which was bound for Loch Ewe.

On 12 March 1941, Empire Frost was bombed whilst in St Georges Channel. Severely damaged, she was taken in tow the next day by the Dutch tug Seine, but was bombed and sunk by Heinkel He 111 aircraft of Kampfgeschwader 27, with the loss of six of her crew. Those lost on Empire Frost are commemorated on the Tower Hill Memorial in London.
