= Alfred Cheetham =

British sea officer and polar explorer (1866–1918)

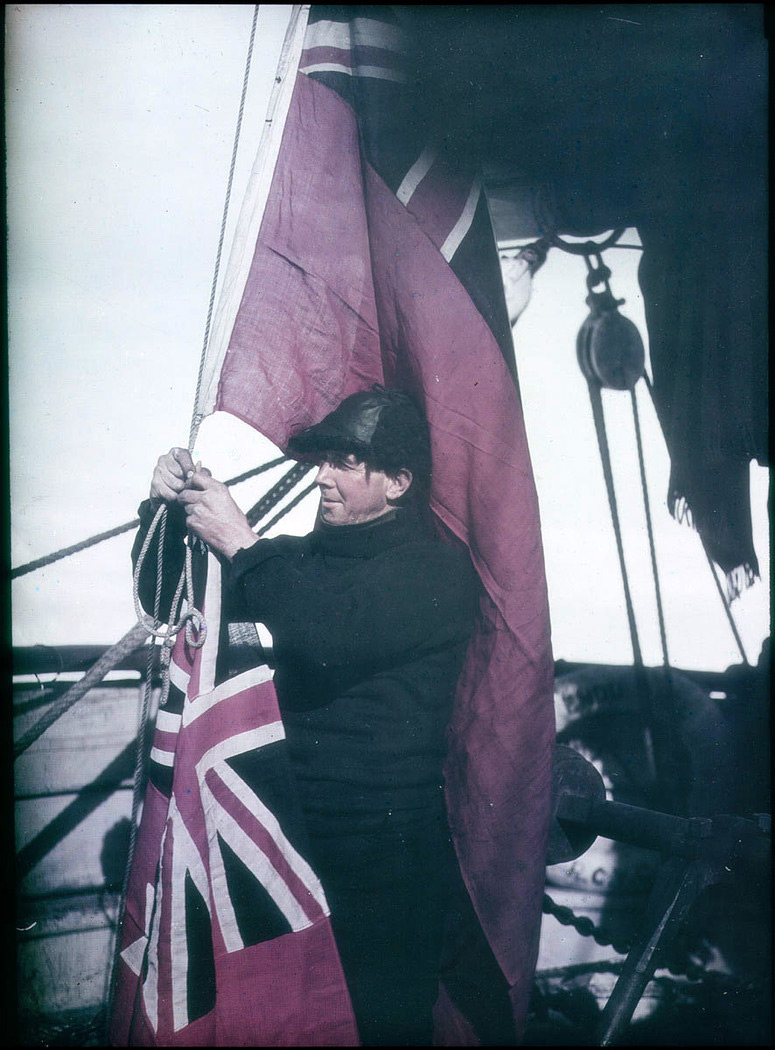
- Alfred Cheetam during the Imperial Trans-Antarctic Expedition, Paget colour photograph by Frank Hurley
- Born: 6 May 1866; Liverpool, Lancashire, England
- Died: 22 August 1918 (aged 52); SS Prunelle, North Sea
- Military career
- Branch: Royal Navy
- Awards: Polar Medal

Alfred Buchanan Cheetham (6 May 1866 – 22 August 1918) was a member of several Antarctic expeditions. He served as third officer for both the Nimrod expedition and Imperial Trans-Antarctic expedition.

He died at sea when his ship was torpedoed during the First World War.

== Early life ==
Alfred Cheetham was born in Liverpool, England, to John and Annie Elizabeth Cheetham. His family moved to Hull sometime during his youth (possibly around 1877), and he went to sea as a teenager, working on the fishing fleets of the North Sea and mother afield. He married Eliza Sawyer and they had 13 children together. Cheetham worked from his base in Hull as a merchant navy boatswain and a reservist for the Royal Navy.

== Antarctic career ==
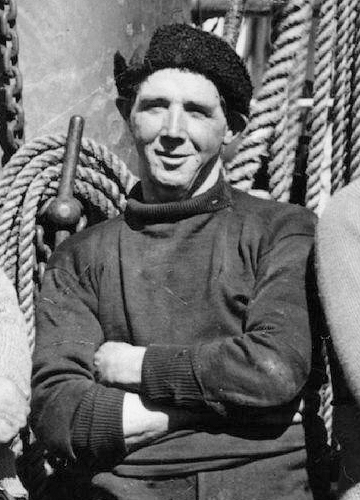
Alf Cheetham on the Terra Nova (1912)

During the Discovery expedition of 1901–1904 Cheetham made his first visit to the Antarctic when served on the relief ship Morning. He traveled to the Antarctic again, this time under the command of Ernest Shackleton, on the Nimrod expedition where he was third officer and boatswain.

He returned once more with the Terra Nova expedition, Robert Falcon Scott's ill-fated attempt to be the first to reach the South Pole. He served as boatswain aboard the Terra Nova and although he volunteered for the search party that was to look for Scott's party he was turned down as he was a family man. By the time of the Imperial Trans-Antarctic Expedition in 1914, the 48-year-old Cheetham was the crew member with most experience of the Antarctic, having spent almost six years in the seas around the continent

He was Third Officer on board the Endurance ship and was a popular and cheerful member of the crew. Frank Worsley, who was a fellow crew member, refers to him as "a pirate to his fingertips". After Endurance was crushed in pack ice and the men set up for Elephant Island in the three lifeboats, he was part of Worsley's crew in the Dudley Docker. Worsley mentions that matches had become such precious currency that Cheetham bought a single match from him for the price of a bottle of champagne, to be paid when Cheetham opened his pub in Hull after the war. Cheetham's death in 1918 meant the debt was never paid.

For his efforts during the expedition Cheetham was awarded an appropriate clasp to the Silver Polar Medal that he had previously received for his role in the Discovery Expedition.

== After the Endurance expedition ==
Cheetham returned to Hull after the expedition where he learnt that one of his sons, William Alfred, had been lost at sea while Cheetham had been travelling back from Antarctica. His son, who was 16 years old, was presumed drowned while serving on RMS Adriatic.

Cheetham enlisted in the Mercantile Marine and was serving as second officer on SS Prunelle when on 22 August 1918, he was killed when the ship was torpedoed in the North Sea by a German U-boat. Cheetham is commemorated on the Tower Hill Memorial.

In 2016, a plaque was installed at Hull Paragon station, jointly commemorating Cheetham and fellow Antarctic explorer William Colbeck: 'Two of many Hull seafarers on the ship Morning who participated in the Antarctic expeditions to relieve Captain Scott 1902–1904 and were welcomed by thousands at this station on their return'.
