= SS Empire Dorado =

World War II merchant ship of the United Kingdom

History
- Name: Tolosa (1920–40); Empire Dorado (1940–41)
- Owner: United States Shipping Board (1920–37); United States Maritime Commission (1937–40); Ministry of War Transport (1940–41)
- Operator: United States Shipping Board (1920–37); United States Maritime Commission (1937–40); Runciman (London) Ltd (1940–41)
- Port of registry: Portsmouth, United States (1920–1940); London, United Kingdom (1940–41)
- Builder: Atlantic Corporation
- Yard number: 8
- Launched: 1920
- Completed: September 1920
- Identification: United States Official Number 220353 (1920–40); United Kingdom Official Number 168017 (1940–41); Code Letters MBCN (1920–34); Code Letters GFZX (1940–41)
- Fate: Sank after a collision

General characteristics
- Class & type: Design 1019 cargo ship
- Tonnage: 5,500 GRT (1920–40); 5,595 (1940–41); 3,373 NRT (1940–41)
- Length: 411 ft 2 in (125.32 m)
- Beam: 54 ft 2 in (16.51 m)
- Depth: 29 ft 9 in (9.07 m)
- Propulsion: Triple expansion steam engine

Location where Empire Dorado sank.

Empire Dorado was a 5,595 GRT design 1019 cargo ship that was built in 1920 as Tolosa by Atlantic Corporation, Portsmouth, New Hampshire, United States for the United States Shipping Board (USSB), passing to the United States Maritime Commission (USMC) in 1937. She was sold to the United Kingdom in 1940, passed to the Ministry of War Transport (MoWT) and renamed Empire Dorado. She served until November 1941, when she was in collision with another ship. Although taken in tow, she subsequently sank.

== Description ==
The ship was built in 1920 by Atlantic Corporation, Portsmouth, New Hampshire. She was yard number 8.

The ship was 411 feet 2 inches (125.32 m) long, with a beam of 54 feet 2 inches (16.51 m). She had a depth of 29 feet 9 inches (9.07 m). As built, she was assessed at 5,500 GRT.

The ship was propelled by a 359 nhp triple expansion steam engine, which had cylinders of 24 1/2 inches (62 cm), 41 1/2 inches (105 cm) and 72 inches (180 cm) diameter by 48 inches (120 cm) stroke. The engine was built by Atlantic Corporation. It drove a single screw propeller.

== History ==
Tolosa was launched in 1920 and completed in September of that year. She was built for the USSB. The United States Official Number 220353 and Code Letters MBCN were allocated. Her port of registry was Portsmouth, New Hampshire. On 20 March 1923, the Italian steamship Giulia requested assistance when she was off Saint Pierre and Miquelon. Tolosa responded from 52 nautical miles (96 km) away. In 1937, ownership passed to the USMC.

In 1940, Tolosa was sold to the MoWT and was renamed Empire Dorado. She was operated under the management of Runciman (London) Ltd. The United Kingdom Official Number 168017 and Code Letters GLZX were allocated. Her port of registry was London. She was assessed at 5,595 GRT, 3,373 NRT.

Empire Dorado was due to have been a member of Convoy HX 59, which departed from Halifax, Nova Scotia, Canada, on 19 July and arrived at Liverpool, Lancashire on 3 August. She did not sail with the convoy, nor with HX 60, She sailed with Convoy HX 61, which departed on 27 July and arrived at Liverpool on 11 August. She was carrying a cargo of pig iron bound for Glasgow, but was ordered to return to Halifax. Although due to sail with convoys HX 63, HX 64, HX 65 and HX 66, she eventually joined Convoy HX 67, which departed on 20 August and arrived at Liverpool on 4 September.

Empire Dorado was a member of Convoy OB 239, which departed from Liverpool on 4 November 1940. The convoy returned to Oban, Argyllshire, arriving on 8 November. The reason for the return was that reports were received on 6 November by British Naval Intelligence that Admiral Hipper was operating in the Atlantic Ocean. After the convoy scattered, Admiral Hipper called for air support. A squadron of Focke-Wulf Fw 200 Kondors was despatched from Kiel to join Admiral Hipper and her battle group in the attack on Convoy HX 84. As they flew to their destination, OB 239 was spotted and attacked on 8 November. Empire Dorado was bombed by aircraft of I Staffeln, Kampfgeschwader 40, Luftwaffe when she was west of Ireland (55°07′N 16°50′W), killing three crew. Empire Dorado issued an SOS, stating that all her lifeboats had been smashed and that she was slowly sinking. She was towed by HMT Man o' War to the Clyde for repairs. Those killed serving on board Empire Dorado are commemorated on the Tower Hill Memorial.

Empire Dorado was due to have been a member of Convoy ON 19, which departed from Liverpool on 21 September 1941 and dispersed at sea on 7 October. She was to have been in ballast, bound for Baltimore, Maryland, United States, but did not join the convoy. She departed from the Clyde on 28 September 1941, joining Convoy ON 21, which had departed from Liverpool that day and dispersed at 45°05′N 52°37′W on 14 October. She proceeded to Halifax, arriving on 18 October. She sailed from Halifax on 2 November for Sydney, Cape Breton, arriving two days later.

Empire Dorado was to have joined Convoy SC 52, which departed from Sydney on 29 October and returned to Sydney on 5 November, but she did not sail with the convoy. She joined Convoy SC 53, which departed on 4 November and arrived at Liverpool on 24 November. She was carrying general cargo bound for Manchester, Lancashire. On 20 November, Empire Dorado collided with the Greek cargo ship Theomitor. Although taken in tow by a Royal Navy ship, she sank on 22 November at 57°58′N 20°38′W. All crew were evacuated before the ship sank.
