= SS Empire Florizel =

World War II merchant ship of the United Kingdom

History
- Name: Empire Florizel
- Owner: Ministry of War Transport
- Operator: J & G Harrison & Co. Ltd.
- Port of registry: Greenock, United Kingdom
- Builder: Lithgows
- Yard number: 990
- Launched: 21 April 1943
- Maiden voyage: 25 June 1943
- Out of service: 21 July 1943
- Identification: United Kingdom Official Number 169503; Code Letters BFGY
- Fate: Bombed and sunk

General characteristics
- Type: Cargo ship
- Tonnage: 7,056 GRT; 4,680 NRT
- Length: 432 ft 7 in (131.85 m) (LPP); 447 ft 6 in (136.40 m) (OL)
- Beam: 56 ft 2 in (17.12 m)
- Draught: 26 ft 8 in (8.13 m)
- Depth: 33 ft 8 in (10.26 m)
- Installed power: Triple expansion steam engine, 520 nhp
- Propulsion: Single screw propeller
- Crew: 48 + 21 DEMS gunners

Empire Florizel was a 7,056 GRT cargo ship that was built in 1943 by Lithgows, Greenock, Renfrewshire, United Kingdom for the Ministry of War Transport (MoWT). She had a short career, being bombed and sunk during the Allied invasion of Sicily exactly three months after her launch.

== Description ==
The ship was 432 ft 7 in (131.85 m) long between perpendiculars (447 ft 6 in (136.40 m) overall), with a beam of 56 feet 2 inches (17.12 m). She had a depth of 34 feet 2 inches (10.41 m) and a draught of 26 feet 8 inches (8.13 m). She was assessed at 7,056 GRT, 4,814 NRT.

The ship was propelled by a 520 nhp triple expansion steam engine, which had cylinders of 23½ inches (60 cm), 37½ inches (96 cm) and 68 inches (170 cm) diameter by 48 inches (120 cm) stroke. The engine was built by John Brown & Co. Ltd, Clydebank, Renfrewshire. It drove a single screw propeller.

== History ==
The ship was built in 1943 by Lithgows Ltd, Greenock, Renfrewshire. She was yard number 990. She was launched on 21 April 1943. Her port of registry was Greenock. The Code Letters BFGY andUnited Kingdom Official Number 169503 were allocated. Empire Florizel was operated under the management of J & G Harrison & Co. Ltd., Glasgow, Renfrewshire. Her 48 crew were supplemented by 21 DEMS gunners.

Carrying 4,000 tons of military and invasion stores and fourteen passengers, Empire Florizel made her maiden voyage as a member of Convoy KMS 96G, which departed from the Clyde on 25 June 1943 and passed Gibraltar on 6 July. Redesignated KMS 19, the convoy arrived at Algiers, Algeria on 8 July in preparation for Operation Husky. Redesignated KMS 19Y, the convoy departed from Algiers on 14 July and arrived at Augusta, Sicily, Italy on 20 July. Empire Florizel was bombed and sunk at Augusta on 21 July. Two of her crew, four gunners and three passengers were killed. The two crew members killed are commemorated on the Tower Hill Memorial in London.
