= SS Empire Dryden =

World War II merchant ship of the United Kingdom

History
- Name: Empire Dryden
- Owner: Ministry of War Transport
- Port of registry: Sunderland, United Kingdom
- Builder: William Doxford & Sons Ltd
- Yard number: 682
- Launched: 22 October 1941
- Completed: February 1942
- Maiden voyage: 27 February 1942
- Out of service: 20 April 1942
- Identification: United Kingdom Official Number 169010; Code Letters BCTN
- Fate: Torpedoed and sunk

General characteristics
- Type: Cargo ship
- Tonnage: 7,164 GRT; 5,051 NRT
- Length: 428 ft 8 in (130.66 m)
- Beam: 56 ft 5 in (17.20 m)
- Draught: 27 feet 4 3/4 inches (8.350 m)
- Depth: 35 ft 5 in (10.80 m)
- Installed power: 511 nhp
- Propulsion: Triple expansion steam engine
- Speed: 10 knots (19 km/h)
- Crew: 45, plus 6 DEMS gunners
- Armament: one 4-inch gun, one 20mm gun, four machine guns

Location where Empire Dryden was torpedoed and sunk off the coast of the United States.

Empire Dryden was a 7,164 GRT cargo ship that was built in 1941 by William Doxford & Sons Ltd, Sunderland, Co Durham, United Kingdom for the Ministry of War Transport (MoWT). Completed in February 1942, she had a short career, being torpedoed and sunk on 20 April 1942 by U-572.

== Description ==
The ship was built in 1942 by William Doxford & Sons Ltd, Sunderland. She was yard number 682.

The ship was 428 feet 8 inches (130.66 m) long, with a beam of 56 feet 5 inches (17.20 m). She had a depth of 35 feet 5 inches (10.80 m) and a draught of 27 feet 4 3/4 inches (8.350 m). She was assessed at 7,164 GRT, 5,051 NRT.

As built, the ship was propelled by a 511 nhp triple expansion steam engine, which had cylinders of 23 1/2 inches (60 cm), 37 1/2 inches (95 cm) and 68 inches (170 cm) diameter by 48 inches (120 cm) stroke. The engine was built by Fairfield & Co Ltd, Glasgow. It could propel the ship at 10 knots (19 km/h).

== History ==
Empire Dryden was launched on 22 October 1941 and completed in February 1942. The United Kingdom Official Number 169010 and Code Letters BCTN were allocated. Her port of registry was Sunderland and she was placed under the management of Sir R Ropner & Co Ltd. She was armed with a four-inch gun, a 20 mm gun and four machine guns. Her crew totalled 51 officers and men, including six DEMS gunners.

Empire Dryden made her maiden voyage on 27 February 1942, departing from Sunderland to join Convoy FN 642, which had departed from Southend, Essex the previous day and arrived at Methil, Fife on 28 February. She then joined Convoy EN 53, which departed on 1 March and arrived at Oban, Argyllshire on 4 March. Empire Dryden was in ballast. She left the convoy at Loch Ewe on 3 March. She then joined Convoy ON 74, which departed from Liverpool, Lancashire on 9 March and arrived at Halifax, Nova Scotia, Canada on 25 March. She then joined Convoy XB 5, which departed on 27 March and arrived at Boston, Massachusetts, United States on 29 March. She left the convoy at the Cape Cod Canal that day and sailed to New York, arriving on 1 April.

Empire Dryden departed from New York on 17 April, laden with 7,000 long tons (7,100 t) of general cargo and military stores. She was bound for Alexandria, Egypt via Table Bay, South Africa. On 19 April, she reported the position of some from the survivors of the Argentine tanker Victoria to USS Owl, which was nearby. At 03:06 (German time) on 20 April, Empire Dryden was hit by one of the three torpedoes which had been fired by U-572. She was 240 nautical miles (440 km) north west of Bermuda (34°12′N 69°00′W). The torpedo hit the starboard side of the No. 2 hold, blowing off the bow and causing the ship to start sinking.

All on board took to the lifeboats, with some difficulty as the engine was still running. The next day, the smallest of the three lifeboats had to be abandoned as it was taking on water. The survivors in that lifeboat were divided between the other two lifeboats. One lifeboat with 25 of the crew and the three DEMS gunners on board was last seen on 22 April, and is presumed to have foundered in a gale sometime during the next two days. The other lifeboat, with 22 crew and three DEMS gunners on board, sailed for 450 nautical miles (830 km) until the survivors were spotted by the American passenger ship City of Birmingham at 30°37′N 77°15′W and rescued. They were landed in Bermuda on 8 May. Those lost from Empire Dryden are commemorated on the Tower Hill Memorial, London.
