= SS City of Bedford =

British cargo steamship

Coordinates: 60°03′N 23°01′W

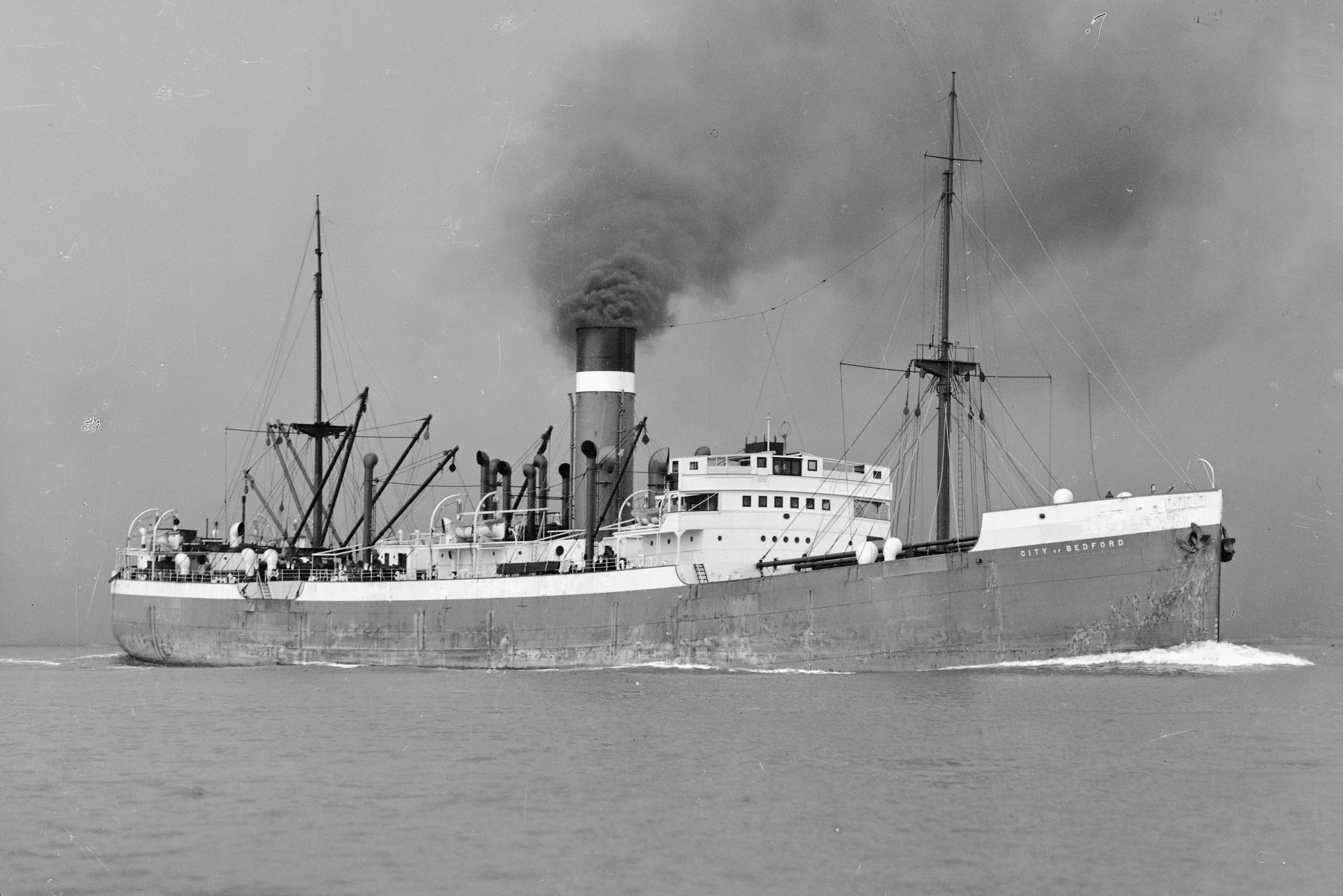
- City of Bedford on the river Scheldt

History

United Kingdom
- Name: City of Bedford
- Owner: Ellerman Lines Ltd
- Operator: Hall Line Ltd
- Port of registry: Liverpool
- Builder: William Gray & Co, Sunderland
- Yard number: 960
- Launched: 17 July 1924
- Completed: October 1924
- Identification: UK official number 147284; Code letters KRMG (until 1933); Call sign GKVY (1934 onward)
- Fate: Sunk by collision, 30 Dec 1940

General characteristics
- Type: Cargo ship
- Tonnage: as built: 6,407 GRT; 4,107 NRT; 1933 onward: 6,402 GRT; 4,100 NRT
- Length: 430.0 ft (131.1 m)
- Beam: 55.1 ft (16.8 m)
- Draught: 27 ft 9 in (8.46 m)
- Depth: 31.1 ft (9.5 m)
- Decks: 2
- Installed power: as built: 728 NHP; 1933 onward: 844 NHP
- Propulsion: as built: quadruple-expansion engine; added 1933: exhaust steam turbine
- Speed: 12.5 knots (23 km/h)
- Sensors & processing systems: 1935 onward: wireless direction finding; echo sounding device
- Armament: By 1940: DEMS

SS City of Bedford was a British cargo steamship. She was launched in 1924 in Sunderland for Hall Line Ltd of Liverpool, a member of the Ellerman Lines group.

In December 1940 City of Bradford collided in fog the North Atlantic with another British cargo ship, Bodnant. Both ships sank, and 48 of City of Bedford's crew were killed.

She was the first of two Ellerman Lines ships to be called City of Bedford. The second was a steam turbine ship that Alexander Stephen and Sons launched in 1950 and Ellerman Lines sold in 1972.

== Details ==
William Gray & Company built City of Bradford at the former Ellerman, Gray, Inchcape and Strick (EGIS) shipyard in Sunderland on the River Wear. She was launched on 17 July 1924 and completed that October.

She was 430.0 ft (131.1 m) long, had a beam of 55.1 ft (16.8 m) and draught of 27 ft 9 in (8.46 m). William Gray and Company's Central Marine Engine Works in West Hartlepool built her quadruple-expansion engine, which was rated at 728 NHP.

In 1933 Hall Line had a Bauer-Wach exhaust steam turbine added. Exhaust steam from the low-pressure cylinder of her piston engine drove the turbine. The turbine drove the same shaft as her piston engine by double-reduction gearing and a Föttinger fluid coupling.

The exhaust turbine increased City of Bedford's fuel efficiency. It also increased her total installed power to 844 NHP, which was a 16 per cent increase and gave her a speed of 12.5 knots (23 km/h).

By 1935 City of Bedford had been fitted with wireless direction finding and an echo sounding device.

== Second World War service ==
In the Second World War City of Bedford traded between India, Burma, Ceylon, and the east coast of Canada and the United States. She usually sailed unescorted.

On her trips between the Indian Ocean and North America, City of Bedford usually went via Port of Cape Town, except in February 1940 when she made an eastbound trip via the Mediterranean and the Suez Canal. In May, July and November 1940 she called in Trinidad.

In November and December 1940 City of Bedford also called at Montreal, New York, Philadelphia and Baltimore, before reaching Halifax, Nova Scotia on 16 December.

On 18 December 1940 City of Bedford left Halifax in Convoy HX 97, which was bound for Liverpool. It was the first time she had sailed in a convoy. According to one account her cargo included half a million ammunition cartridges.

On 30 December in fog 280 miles south of Iceland HX 97 ran into Convoy OB 265 coming in the opposite direction. City of Bedford collided with the Elder Dempster Lines cargo ship Bodnant, causing both ships to sink. All of Bodnant's crew survived, but 48 of City of Bedford's crew were killed.

== Bibliography ==
- Slader, John (1988). The Red Duster at War. London: William Kimber & Co Ltd. p. 102. ISBN 0-7183-0679-1.
