= SS Empire Cabot =

World War II merchant ship of the United Kingdom

History
- Name: Empire Cabot (1941-45); Clearpool (1945-55); Grelmarion (1955-59); Rachel (1959)
- Owner: Ministry of War Transport (1941-45); Pool Shipping Co Ltd (1945-55); Cardigan Shipping Co Ltd (1955-59); Bowring & Curry Ltd (1959)
- Operator: Glen & Co Ltd (1941-42); Sir R Ropner & Co Ltd (1942-48); Australian Shipping Board (1948) Sir R Ropner & Co LTd (1948-55); T Walter Gould & Co Ltd (1955-59); Robert M Sloman Jr (1959)
- Port of registry: (United Kingdom) West Hartlepool (1941-55); (United Kingdom) Cardiff (1955-59); (West Germany) Hamburg (1959)
- Builder: William Gray & Co. Ltd.
- Yard number: 1118
- Launched: 9 July 1941
- Completed: September 1941
- Identification: United Kingdom Official Number 168929 (1941-59); Code Letters BCPM; (1941-59)
- Fate: Scrapped 1959

General characteristics
- Tonnage: 6,715 gross register tons (GRT); 4,836 NRT
- Length: 419 ft 2 in (127.76 m)
- Beam: 56 ft 7 in (17.25 m)
- Depth: 33 ft 9 in (10.29 m)
- Installed power: Triple expansion steam engine
- Propulsion: Screw propeller
- Speed: 10 knots (19 km/h)

Empire Cabot was a 6,715 GRT cargo ship which was built in 1941 for the British Ministry of War Transport (MoWT). She was sold in 1945 and renamed Clearpool. In 1955 she was sold and renamed Grelmarion. A further change of name to Rachel happened in 1959 and she was scrapped later that year.

== Description ==
Empire Cabot was built by William Gray & Co. Ltd., West Hartlepool for the MoWT. Built as yard number 1118, she was launched on 9 July 1941 and completed in September.

The ship was 419 feet 2 inches (127.76 m) long, with a beam of 56 feet 7 inches (17.25 m) and a depth of 33 feet 9 inches (10.29 m). She had a GRT of 6,715 and a NRT of 4,836. She was propelled by a triple expansion steam engine which had cylinders of 22.5 inches (57 cm), 36 inches (91 cm) and 65 inches (170 cm) diameter by 48 inches (120 cm) stroke. The engine was built by the Central Marine Engineering Works, West Hartlepool. The engine drove a single screw propeller and could propel her at 10 knots (19 km/h).

== History ==
Empire Cabot was allocated the United Kingdom Official Number 168929. She used the Code Letters BCPM. She was owned by the MoWT and operated under the management of Glen & Co Ltd.

Empire Cabot was a member of a number of convoys during the Second World War.

ON 19

Convoy ON 19 departed from Liverpool on 21 September 1941 and from Loch Ewe on 23 September. It dispersed at sea on 7 October. Empire Cabot was in ballast and was bound for Tampa, Florida. She lost contact with the convoy at around 01:00 on 24 September off the Butt of Lewis. She returned to Loch Ewe to await the next convoy.

ON 21

Convoy ON 21 departed Loch Ewe on 30 September 1941. Empire Cabot was bound for Hampton Roads.

In 1942, management was transferred to Sir R Ropner & Co Ltd.

ON 79

Convoy ON 79 departed Reykjavík, Iceland on 22 March 1942.

ON 95

Convoy ON 95 departed Liverpool on 15 May 1942. Empire Cabot was bound for Tampa, Florida.

Convoy OG.89 On 28 August 1942 Empire Cabot loaded 28 Spitfire Vb aircraft and 24 Hurricanes for Gibraltar arriving 19 September. The Spitfire aircraft were serial numbers AB535, AR496, AR556, AR559, AR560, AR561, EP444, EP470, EP473, EP520, EP537, EP567, EP568, EP620, EP622, EP641, EP642, EP650, EP652, EP662, EP667, EP721, EP728, EP790, EP817, EP823, EP832 and EP843. The Empire Franklin delivered a further 27 Spitfires and the Empire Heath 17. 31 (or 32) of these aircraft were transferred to HMS Furious at Gibraltar and 29 flown off to Malta on 29 October as part of Operation Train.

SC 125

Convoy SC 125 departed from Halifax, Nova Scotia on 31 March 1943 and arrived at Liverpool on 15 April. Empire Cabot was carrying a cargo of grain.

In 1945, Empire Cabot was sold to Ropner's and renamed Clearpool. On 1 March 1948, she was chartered by the Australian Shipping Board, returning to Ropner's on 8 December. In 1955, Clearpool was sold to Cardigan Shipping Co Ltd, Cardiff and renamed Grelmarion. She was operated under the management of T Walter Gould Ltd. In 1959 she was sold to Bowring & Curry, Hamburg and renamed Rachel. She was operated under the management of Robert M Sloman Jr and was scrapped later that year in Hong Kong. Those lost on Empire Cabot are commemorated at the Tower Hill Memorial, London.
