= SS Prunelle =

British-owned cargo ship

History
- Name: 1874: Gota; 1878: Saturnus; 1911: Prunelle
- Owner: 1909: Bergenske Dampsskibselskab; 1911: Johnsen & Bergman; 1918: Shipping Controller
- Port of registry: 1874: (Sweden); 1878: (Norway) Bergen; 1918: (United Kingdom of Great Britain and Ireland) London
- Ordered: 1874
- Builder: Bergsund Mekaniske Verksted
- Yard number: 114
- Launched: September 1874
- In service: 1874
- Identification: 1918: UK official number 142461
- Fate: Sunk by torpedo, 22 August 1918

General characteristics
- Type: Cargo ship
- Tonnage: 577 GRT, 412 NRT
- Length: 155.9 ft (47.5 m)
- Beam: 26.7 ft (8.1 m)
- Depth: 12.9 feet (3.9 m)
- Decks: 1
- Installed power: 1 x compound engine; 65 NHP
- Propulsion: 1 × screw
- Speed: 8 knots (15 km/h)
- Crew: 16

SS Prunelle was a UK-owned cargo ship. She was built in Sweden in 1874 as Gota. In 1878 she was acquired by Norwegian owners, who renamed her Saturnus. In 1911 she changed owners again, and was renamed Prunelle. The UK Shipping Controller bought her in 1918.

Later in 1918, SM UB-112 sank her by torpedo in the North Sea 2 nautical miles (3.7 km) south east of Blyth, Northumberland. She was carrying a cargo of jute from London to Dundee.

== Building ==
The Bergsund Mekaniske Verksted shipyard in Stockholm, Sweden built the ship in 1874. Her registered length was 155.9 ft (47.5 m), her beam was 26.7 ft (8.1 m), and her depth was 12.9 feet (3.9 m). Her tonnages were 577 GRT and 412 NRT. She had a single screw, driven by a two-cylinder compound engine that was rated at 65 NHP and gave her a speed of 8 knots (15 km/h).

== Loss ==
Prunelle left London for Dundee on 22 August 1918 with a crew of 16 and a cargo of jute. Her Second Officer, Alfred Cheetham, had served on four Antarctic expeditions: Robert Falcon Scott's Discovery and Terra Nova expeditions, and on Ernest Shackleton's Nimrod and Imperial Trans-Antarctic expeditions.

At 13:40 hrs on the same day as she left London, Prunelle was targeted by SM UB-112 when she was 2 nautical miles (3.7 km) south east of Blyth. The U-boat fired a torpedo without warning, which hit the ship on her port side near her engine room. The explosion and rapid sinking of the ship killed 12 of her 16 crew members, including Captain Storm and Second Officer Cheetham. Four survivors were rescued soon after, having clung to wreckage, and were brought ashore at Blyth.

== Wreck ==
The wreck of Prunelle lies at a depth of 24 metres (79 ft).
