= SS Inkosi (1902) =

History

United Kingdom
- Name: SS Inkosi
- Builder: Hall, Russell & Company, Aberdeen
- Launched: 2 October 1902
- Fate: Sunk on 28 March 1918

General characteristics
- Type: Steam merchant ship
- Tonnage: 3,661 tons
- Length: 350 ft

SS Inkosi was a 3661-ton British steamship built in 1902. She measured 350.2′ x 43.3′ x 20.0′ and weighed 3,661 gross tons, 2,274 net tons. Her triple expansion steam engine built by Hall Russell delivered 483 nhp. In 1911 she was purchased by the Charente Steamship Company of Liverpool and began operating out of that port predominantly employed on the Irish Sea routes. She was torpedoed and sunk during the First World War by the German U-boat SM U-96 on 28 March 1918, while on passage from Liverpool for Lamlash and Pernambuco with a general cargo and coal. Two gunners, Lieutenant Corporal W. N. Griffiths and Private S. A. Mahugh, held back manning the aft gun in case the submarine should show herself on the surface. By the time they abandoned ship the decks aft were awash, and the engine room was full of water. However, the ship was to remain stubbornly afloat until a periscope appeared, and the German submarine surfaced, finally sinking the Inkosi with her deck gun. Three crew were lost with the vessel.

The wreck now lies 6½ miles south of Burrow Head in Scotland. (12½ miles NNW of Point of Ayr, Isle of Man, 34 miles west of Whitehaven, England). GPS position 54° 35.463N 004° 24.884W

Largely intact, other than a split about ½ way down (due to the torpedo blast) and considerable collapse of superstructure, she lies on her starboard side at approx 45° with her bow pointing to the SE. The wreck is occasionally dived on.
