= Tower Hill Memorial =

War memorial in Trinity Square Gardens, in London, England

- Commonwealth War Graves Commission
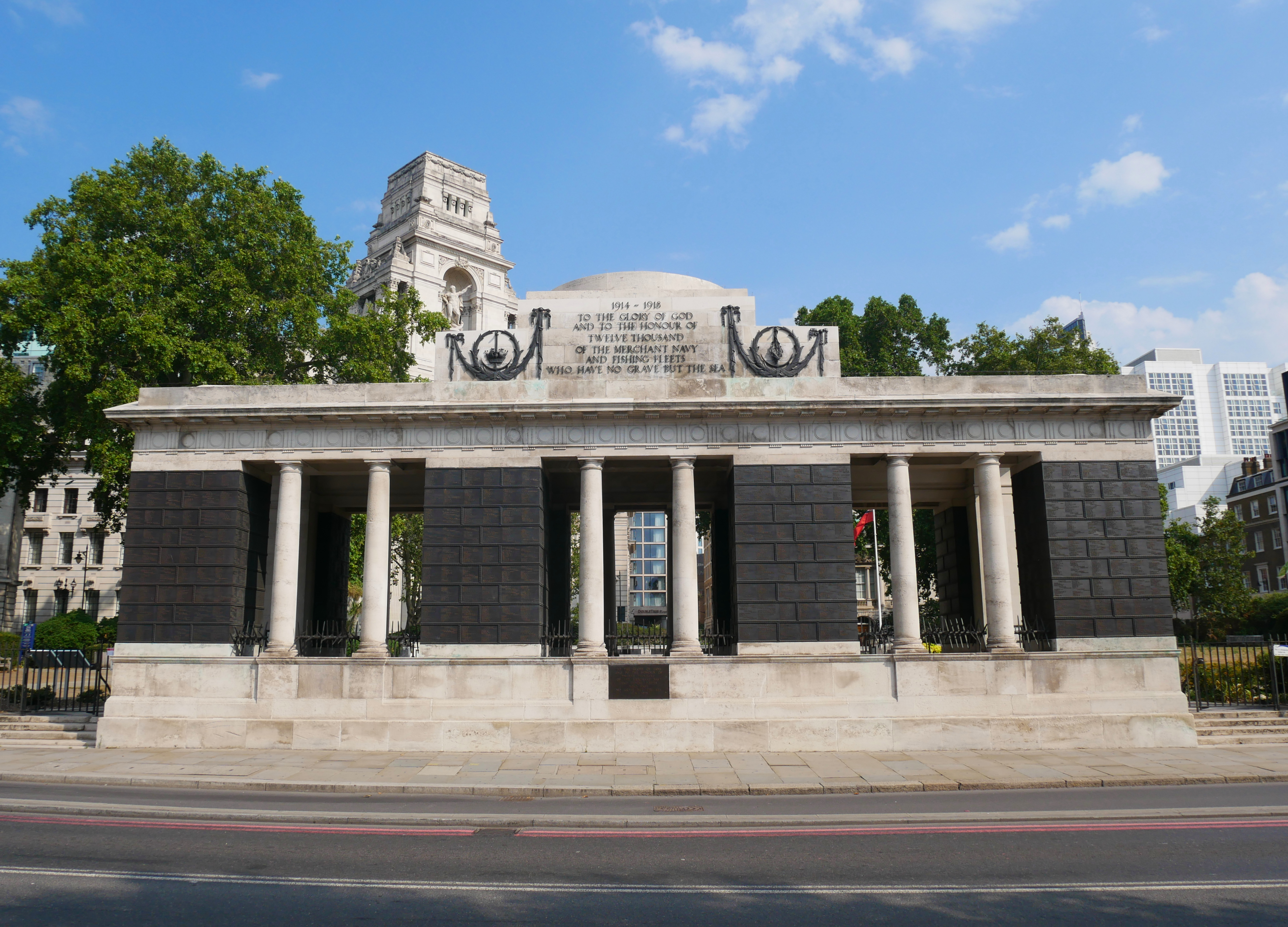
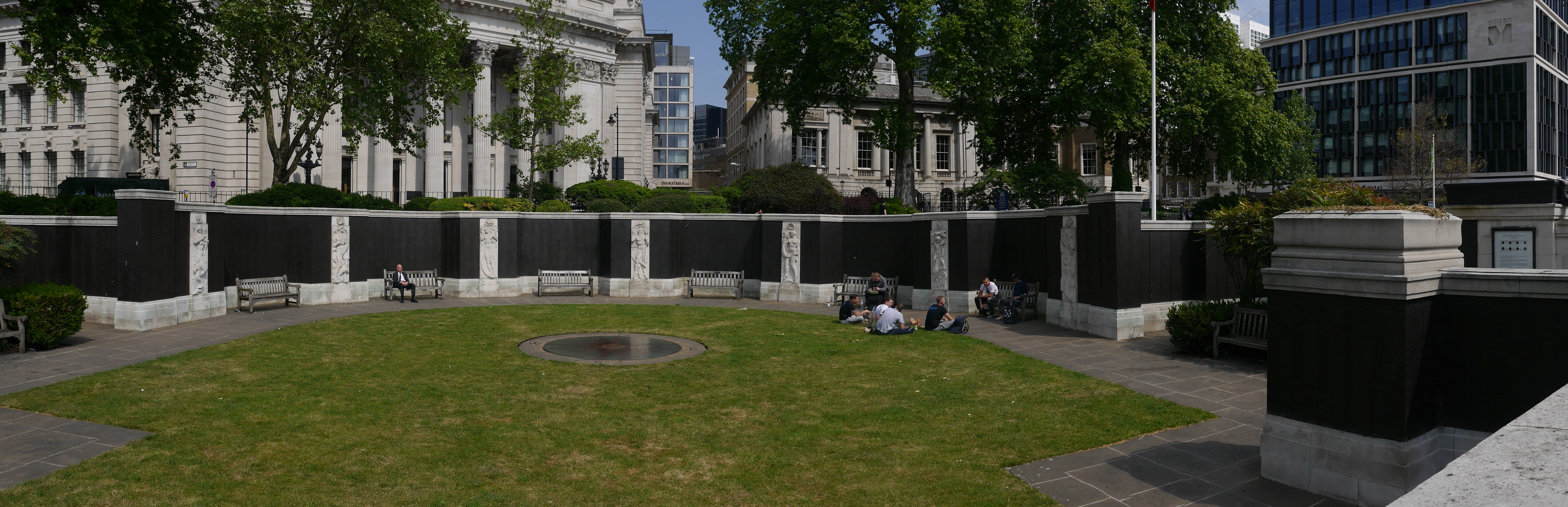
- The Mercantile Marine Memorial The Merchant Seamen's Memorial
- For men and women of the Merchant Navy and fishing fleets who died in both World Wars and who have no known grave
- Unveiled: 12 December 1928; 5 November 1955
- Location: 51.5097°N 0.0777°W; Trinity Square Gardens; London, EC3
- Designed by: Sir Edwin Lutyens; Sir Edward Maufe
- Commemorated: 36,087
- First World War; TO THE GLORY OF GOD AND TO THE HONOUR OF TWELVE THOUSAND OF THE MERCHANT NAVY AND FISHING FLEETS WHO HAVE NO GRAVE BUT THE SEA; Second World War; THE TWENTY FOUR THOUSAND OF THE MERCHANT NAVY AND FISHING FLEETS WHOSE NAMES ARE HONOURED ON THE WALLS OF THIS GARDEN GAVE THEIR LIVES FOR THEIR COUNTRY AND HAVE NO GRAVE BUT THE SEA

Listed Building – Grade I
- Official name: The Mercantile Marine First World War Memorial
- Designated: 27 September 1973
- Reference no.: 1260087

Listed Building – Grade II*
- Official name: Merchant Seamen's Memorial
- Designated: 15 April 1998
- Reference no.: 1031597

The Tower Hill Memorial is a pair of Commonwealth War Graves Commission memorials in Trinity Square Gardens, on Tower Hill in London, England. The memorials, one for the First World War and one for the Second, commemorate civilian, merchant seafarers and fishermen who were killed as a result of enemy action and have no known grave. The first, the Mercantile Marine War Memorial, was designed by Sir Edwin Lutyens and unveiled in 1928; the second, the Merchant Seamen's Memorial, was designed by Sir Edward Maufe and unveiled in 1955. A third memorial, commemorating merchant seamen who were killed in the 1982 Falklands War, was added to the site in 2005.

The first memorial was commissioned in light of the heavy losses sustained by merchant shipping in the First World War—more than 17,000 people died and some 3,300 British and Empire-registered commercial vessels sunk as a result of enemy action. The Imperial War Graves Commission (IWGC) commissioned Lutyens, who initially designed a massive arch on the banks of the River Thames, but this was rejected by the authorities, to Lutyens' disdain. A compromise was struck, as a result of which the memorial was constructed in Trinity Square Gardens on Tower Hill, a site further from the river but with a long maritime history. The site was Crown land, meaning a special Act of Parliament was required to allow the construction. Queen Mary unveiled the memorial on 12 December 1928 at a ceremony broadcast live on the radio, her first use of the medium. The memorial is a vaulted corridor reminiscent of a Doric temple and similar to Lutyens' structures in cemeteries on the Western Front. The walls are clad with bronze panels which bear the names of the missing.

Merchant shipping losses in the Second World War were significantly higher than in the first (4,786 ships, 32,000 lives) and the IWGC commissioned a second memorial on the same site, intended to complement the first. Maufe designed a sunken garden, accessed by steps behind the original memorial, the walls of which were again clad with bronze panels with the names of the missing. At regular intervals between the panels are relief sculptures (by Charles Wheeler) representing the seven seas. Wheeler also sculpted two sentries, a Merchant Navy sailor and officer, which stand at the top of the steps. The new memorial was unveiled by Queen Elizabeth II in November 1955, after which relatives of those named on it were invited to lay flowers.

The memorials to the world wars are both listed buildings—the Mercantile Marine Memorial is grade I and part of a national collection of Lutyens' war memorials, and Maufe's Merchant Seamen's Memorial is listed at grade II*. The Falklands War memorial is not listed.

== First World War memorial ==
=== Background ===
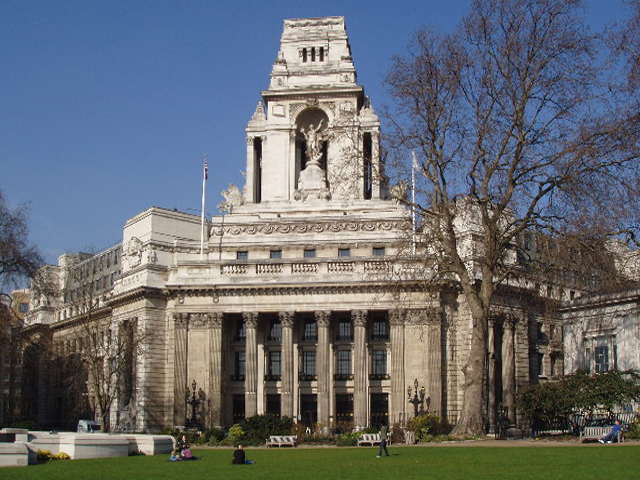
The Port of London Authority building at 10 Trinity Square is one of several nautical buildings in the area.

In the aftermath of the First World War and its unprecedented casualties, thousands of war memorials were built across Britain and other countries affected. In particular, the Imperial War Graves Commission (IWGC) assumed responsibility for commemorating all casualties from the British Empire. The commission was established in 1917, and one of its first principal architects was Sir Edwin Lutyens, an English architect who made his reputation building country houses and later designed much of New Delhi. Lutyens acted as an unpaid advisor to the IWGC during the war, in which capacity he made several visits to France to make initial plans for organised cemeteries. The war had a profound effect on Lutyens; following it, he devoted much of his time to memorialising its casualties. He designed The Cenotaph on Whitehall in central London (which became Britain's national memorial to the two world wars) and many other cemeteries and memorials for the IWGC, including the Thiepval Memorial (completed 1932).

The IWGC and its founder, Fabian Ware, were determined from the outset that all casualties should be individually and equally commemorated, regardless of military rank or social status. Where it was not possible to provide a headstone (for example because a body could not be recovered), a casualty's name was included on one of the commission's large memorials, such as Tower Hill. The Admiralty did not initially believe that the IWGC's remit extended to sailors lost at sea and planned its own commemorations, but after negotiation, it was agreed that the commission would take responsibility for commemorating maritime casualties as it did with those who died on land. The commission's charter defined its scope as "members of the military and naval forces of the Crown"; in 1921 the commissioners resolved that this extended to the Mercantile Marine and other civilian organisations who were engaged in the war effort.

Merchant shipping and fishing fleets played a vital role in supporting the British war effort throughout the First World War, both by resupplying the Royal Navy at sea and by delivering food, products, and raw materials to the United Kingdom. Merchant ships were regularly sunk by the Imperial German Navy from the outset of the war, particularly after Germany commenced unrestricted submarine warfare. By the end of the war, more than 3,300 British- and empire-registered merchant ships had been sunk, with the loss of more than 17,000 lives.

=== History ===
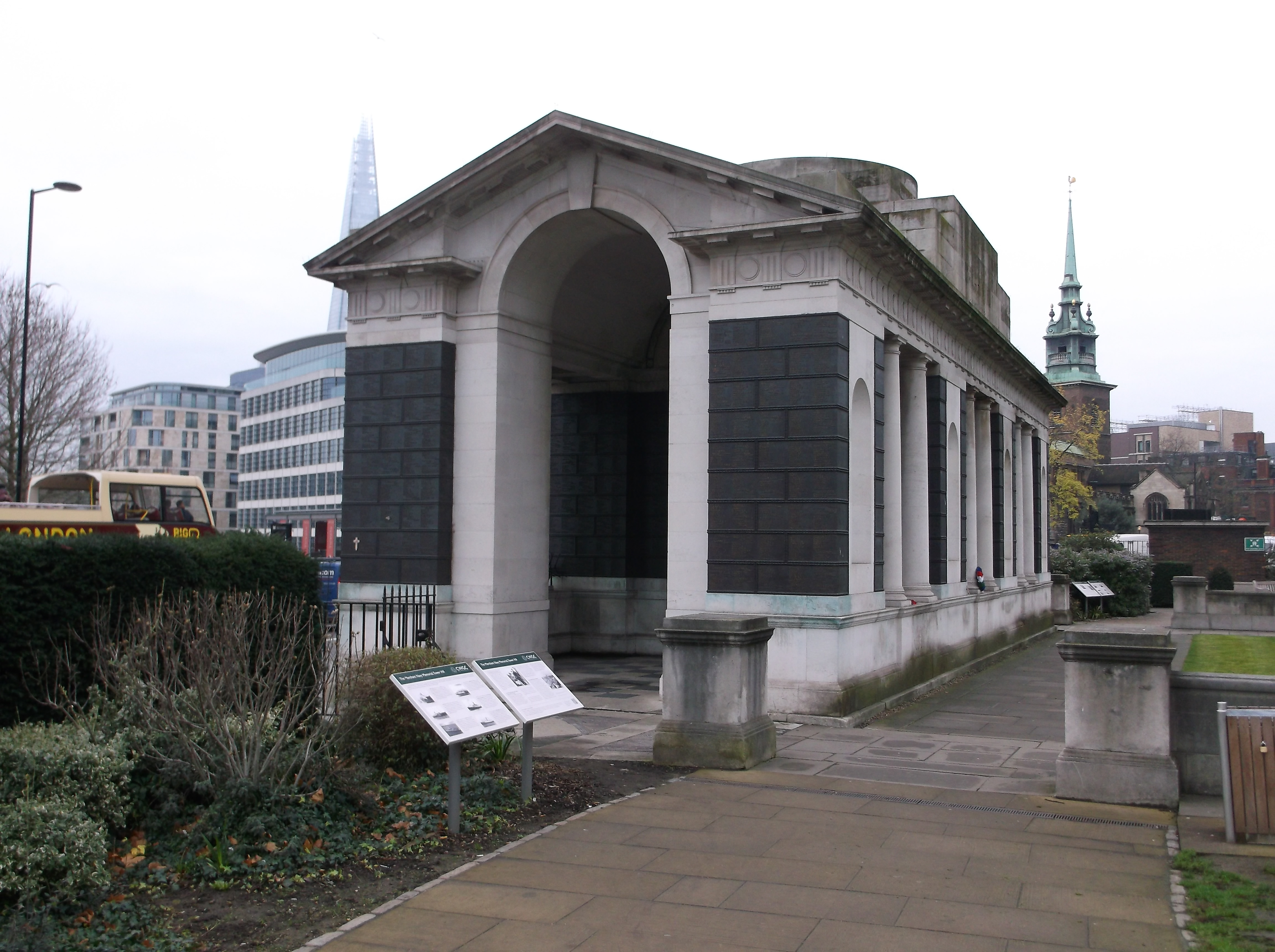
The colonnade viewed from the east entrance to Trinity Square Gardens

The IWGC sought advice on the form of the memorial from the seafarers' unions, who consistently requested a memorial in the form of a home for aged seamen or similar, but the commission was set against functional memorials in the belief that they became associated more with their function than with commemoration. It rejected the request, overruling its own advisory committee in doing so, on the grounds that its charter did not allow it to fund the ongoing costs of an institution. It insisted that merchant seamen would be commemorated on a monument.

The commission first intended to site the memorial at Temple Steps, on the bank of the River Thames, for which it commissioned Lutyens. The architect designed a massive arch. The proposed structure would have consisted of two 54-foot (16-metre) stone piers of linked, alternating arches (reminiscent of the Thiepval Memorial, which he was designing for the IWGC at around the same time) joined by a large beam, itself supported by two Doric columns between the arches. This was approved by London County Council, but the Office of Works rejected it on the advice of the Royal Fine Arts Commission (RFAC), which objected on two grounds: first, that Lutyens' proposal would involve the demolition of an arch built when the Thames Embankment was constructed; and second, that the memorial would be better suited to a site further downstream, east of Tower Bridge, where it would be seen by ocean-going vessels which could not travel west of the bridge. Both Lutyens and Ware attempted to persuade the RFAC to reconsider but to no avail. Lutyens was furious, feeling the merchant seamen had been relegated to "some hole in the corner because they happened to be low in social status" and that Sir Reginald Blomfield (a member of the RFAC and a rival of Lutyens) was acting out of spite.

Lutyens described the RFAC's opinion as "bosh", and suggested to Ware that they should continue regardless and force a confrontation. Ware was more diplomatic, and the IWGC chose a new site in Trinity Square Gardens on Tower Hill, still west of Tower Bridge but further from the river. This site was considered appropriate because it was within sight of the Thames, albeit not on the riverbank, and the area already had maritime connections, including the headquarters of the Port of London Authority at 10 Trinity Square, Trinity House, and the church of All Hallows-by-the-Tower (itself home to many nautically themed memorials). Philip Longworth, in a history of the IWGC, remarked that the location meant the commission's only memorial in London "would never be seen by most Londoners, still less find a place in the national consciousness as did Lutyens' stark monument on Whitehall". (The Cenotaph was not commissioned by the IWGC.)

Mercantile Marine Memorial Act 1927
- Act of Parliament
- Parliament of the United Kingdom
- Long title: An Act to confer powers on the Imperial War Graves Commission with respect to the erection of a memorial to the officers and men of the Mercantile Marine who perished in the late war.
- Citation: 17 & 18 Geo. 5. c.xxvi

Dates
- Royal assent: 29 June 1927

Text of statute as originally enacted

Trinity Square Gardens was Crown land administered by trustees. Although the trustees suggested they would not object to the memorial, they did not have the power to give full consent and a special act of Parliament was required. The bill was laid before Parliament in December 1926 and received royal assent in June 1927, becoming the Mercantile Marine Memorial Act 1927 (17 & 18 Geo. 5. c.xxvi). The building work was undertaken by Holloway Brothers (London) and the memorial was unveiled by Queen Mary (deputising for her husband, King George V) on 12 December 1928, her first solo engagement of the sort. The unveiling ceremony was broadcast live on the radio in the Queen's first use of the medium. Despite taking place in torrential rain, the unveiling ceremony was attended by a large crowd, who cheered the Queen as she was driven away.

=== Design ===
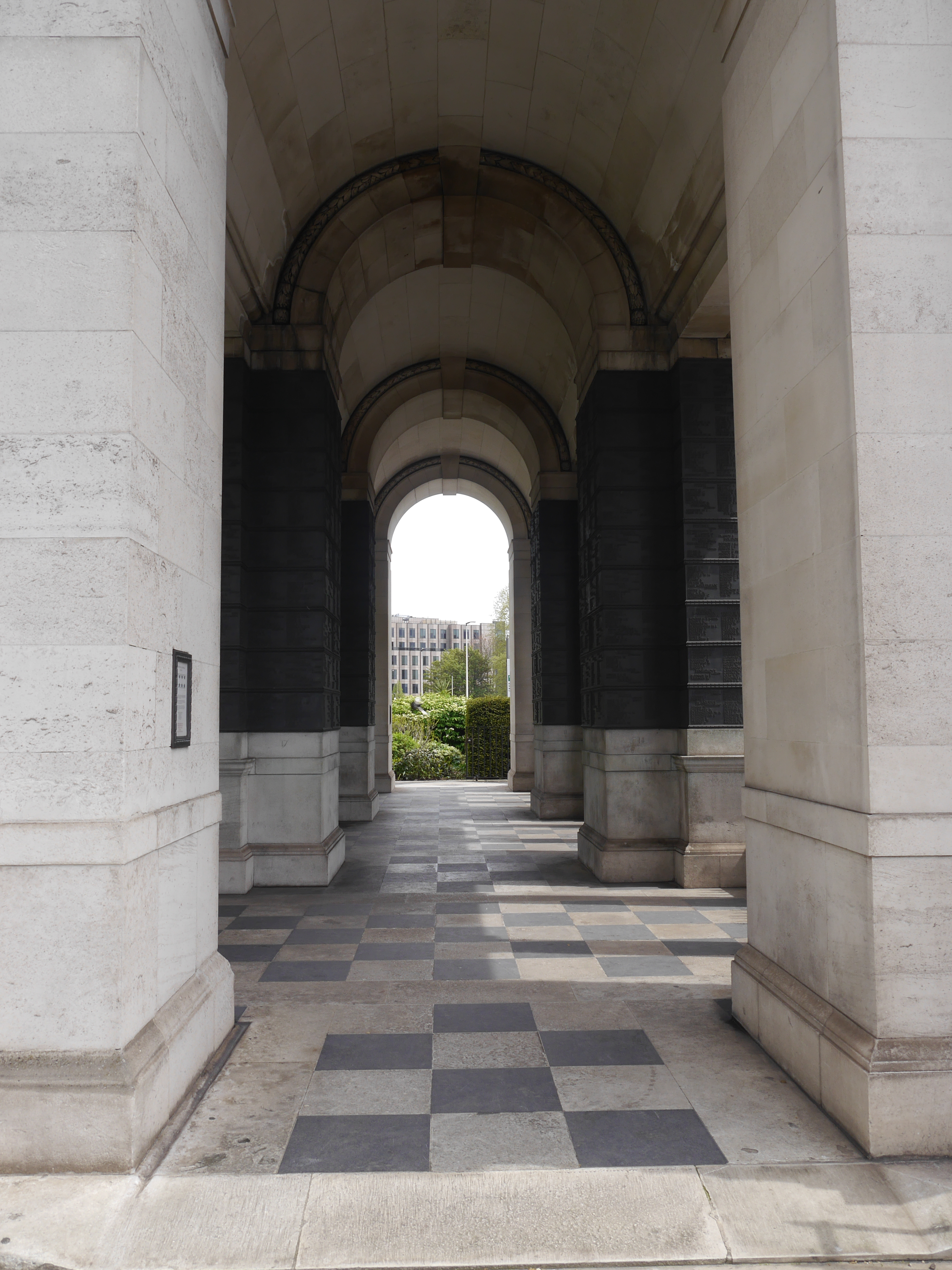
Interior of the colonnade, showing the vaulted ceiling, rusticated walls, and chequerboard-patterned floor

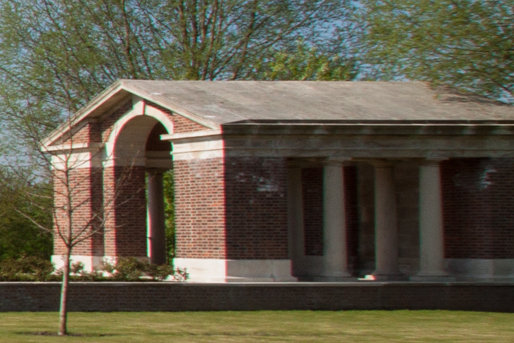
A shelter building at Hooge Crater Cemetery, which Lutyens also designed for the IWGC, has been compared to the Mercantile Marine Memorial.

The main structure is in Portland stone. It takes the form of a vaulted colonnade or pavilion reminiscent of a Doric temple but open at both ends. After the Arch of Remembrance in Leicester, it is Lutyens' second-largest war memorial in the United Kingdom, and is the only British First World War memorial dedicated exclusively to merchant seamen. It is raised on a platform slightly above street level, oriented east to west and accessed from the street by a set of five stone steps at each end. The structure is 21.5 metres (71 feet) long by 7 metres (23 ft) wide and up to 10 metres (33 ft) tall. It consists of three bays on either side, created by eight alternating square piers and six pairs of round columns. The eight piers are clad in rectangular bronze panels to give the impression of rustication. The panels (divided into 24 numbered sections) contain the names of missing mariners, ordered by ship name and then alphabetically following the name of the captain or master. The vessels of the Merchant Navy and Fishing Fleets are listed separately. Above the bays is a Doric entablature. The low, pitched roof has shallow parapets on either side and gabled ends; on top, in the centre, is a large square attic which supports a large stone drum. The attic is similar to Lutyens' original design for the York City War Memorial, which featured a Stone of Remembrance rather than a drum. The sculptural element is the work of William Reid Dick, who worked on several other war memorials, including the Menin Gate in Ypres, Belgium.

The memorial's main dedication is in bronze letters to the front (south) of the attic: TO THE GLORY OF GOD AND TO THE HONOUR OF TWELVE THOUSAND OF THE MERCHANT NAVY AND FISHING FLEETS WHO HAVE NO GRAVE BUT THE SEA; above it are the dates of the First World War (1914–1918), which are also carved into the stone on north side. To either side are decorative bronze wreaths. On the inside, the floor is in black and white stone in a chequerboard pattern. On the north side, bronze spikes occupy the otherwise-open bays.

The largest single loss of life commemorated on the memorial is from the sinking of the RMS Lusitania on 7 May 1915. Of the 1,200 dead, more than 350 British crew members are commemorated on the Mercantile Marine memorial. In total, the First World War memorial records the names of some 12,000 casualties.

In his biography of Lutyens, Michael Barker described the design as "dignified classicism"; another Lutyens biographer, Christopher Hussey, described it as a "classical shrine". Tim Skelton, author of Lutyens and the Great War, notes the similarity of the colonnade to the shelter buildings in Lutyens' cemeteries in France and Belgium and suggests that the memorial would be "equally well at home on the Western Front as in the heart of London". The resemblance to the cemetery buildings is also noted by the Dutch architect Jeroen Geurst, who compares it in particular to those at Hooge Crater in Belgium and Serre Road Cemetery No. 2 in France. In the opinion of the historian David Crane, the memorial never recovered from its "miserable start" and is consequently the least well-known of the IWGC's major works following the First World War.

Plaques bearing the names of the dead from the RMS Lusitania, the largest single loss of life to be commemorated on the Mercantile Marine Memorial

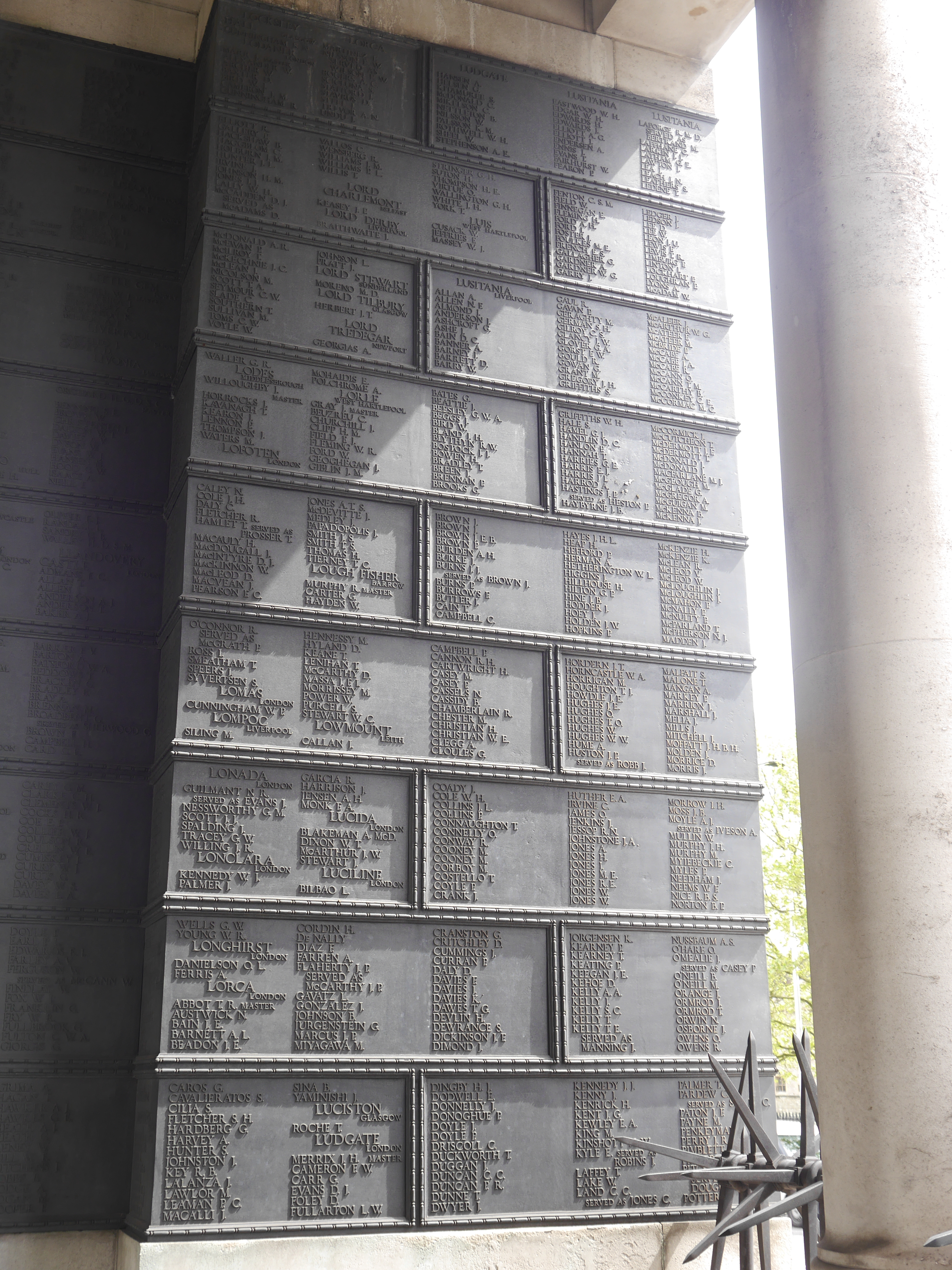

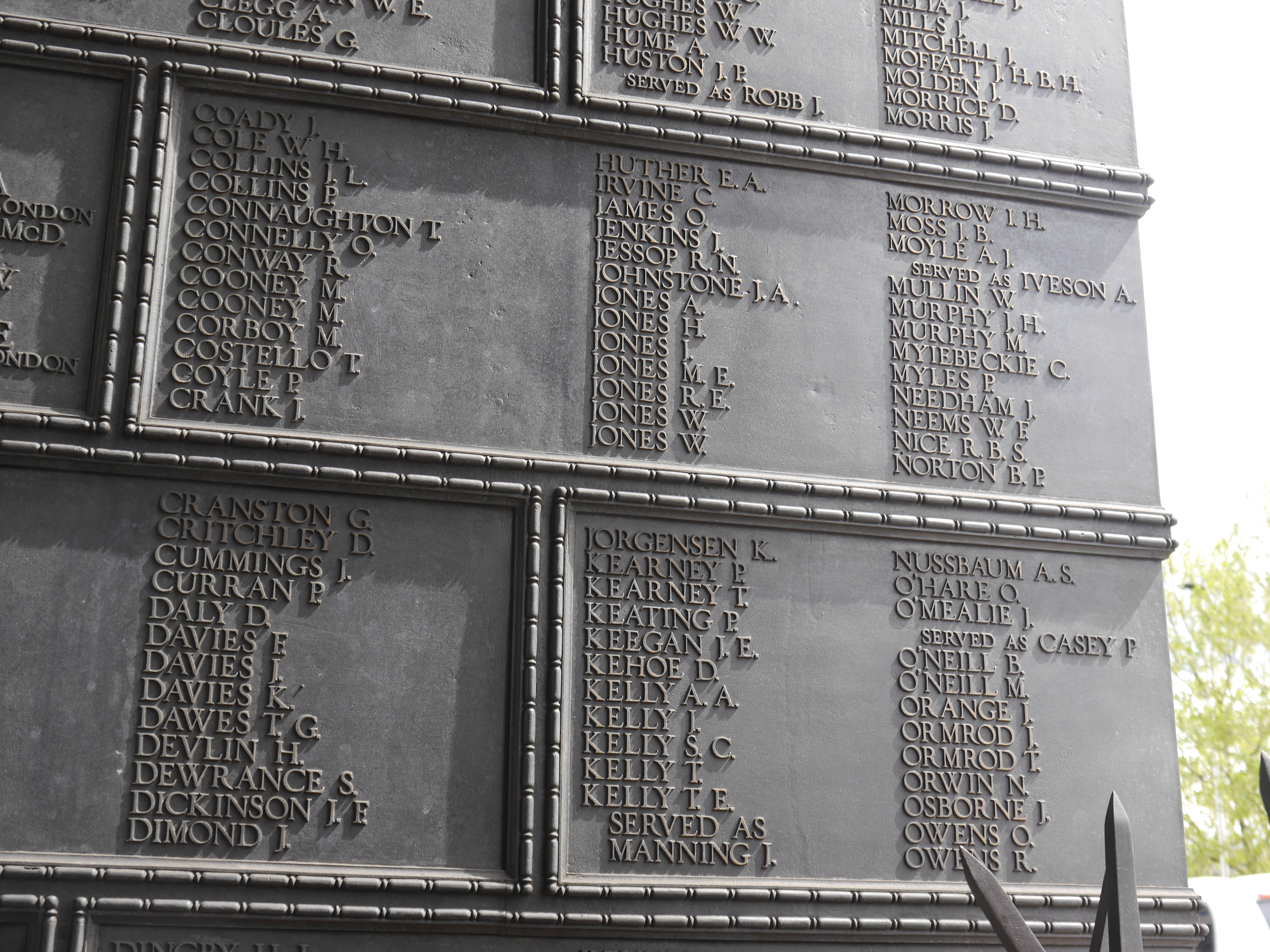

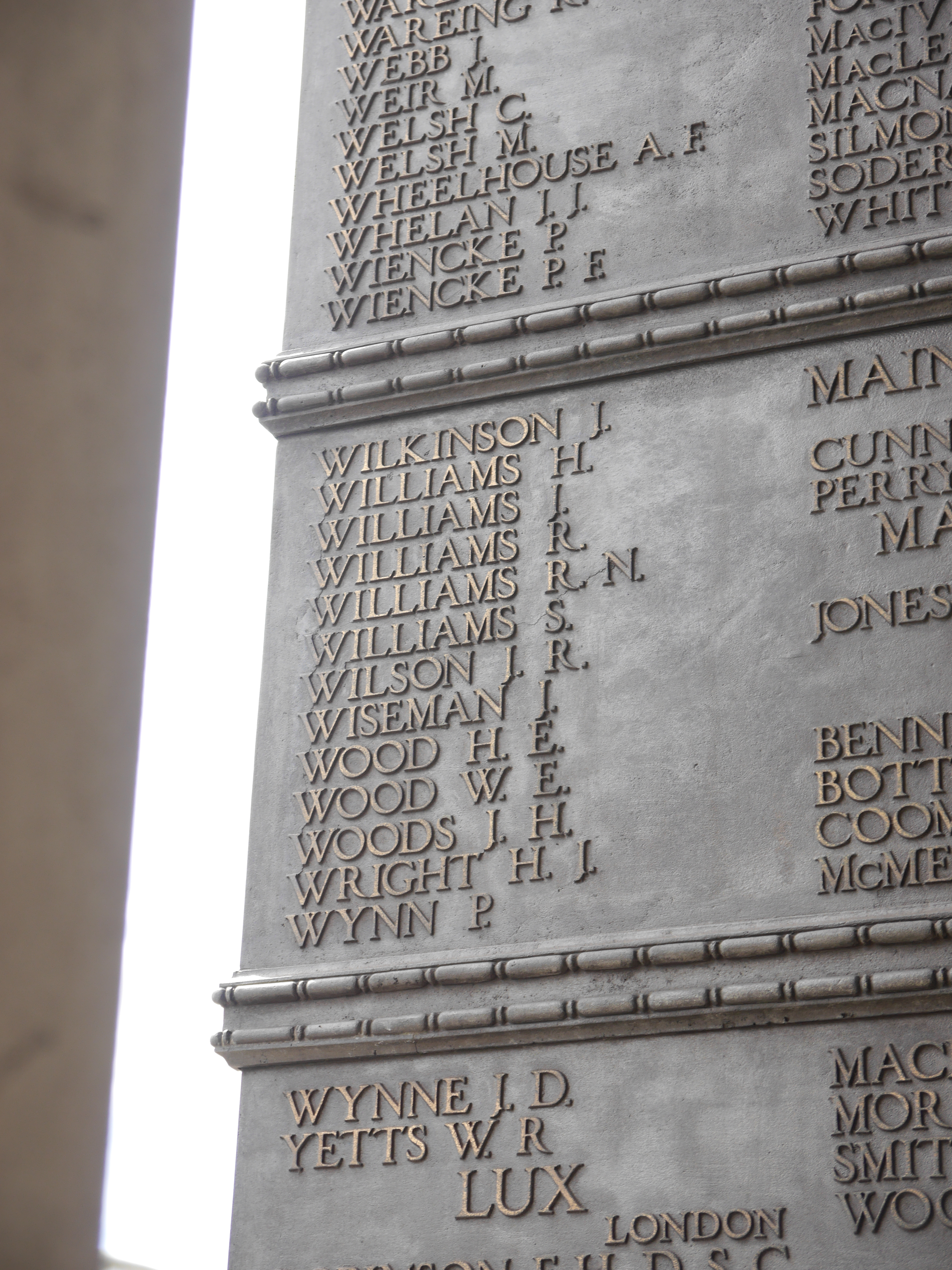

== Second World War memorial ==
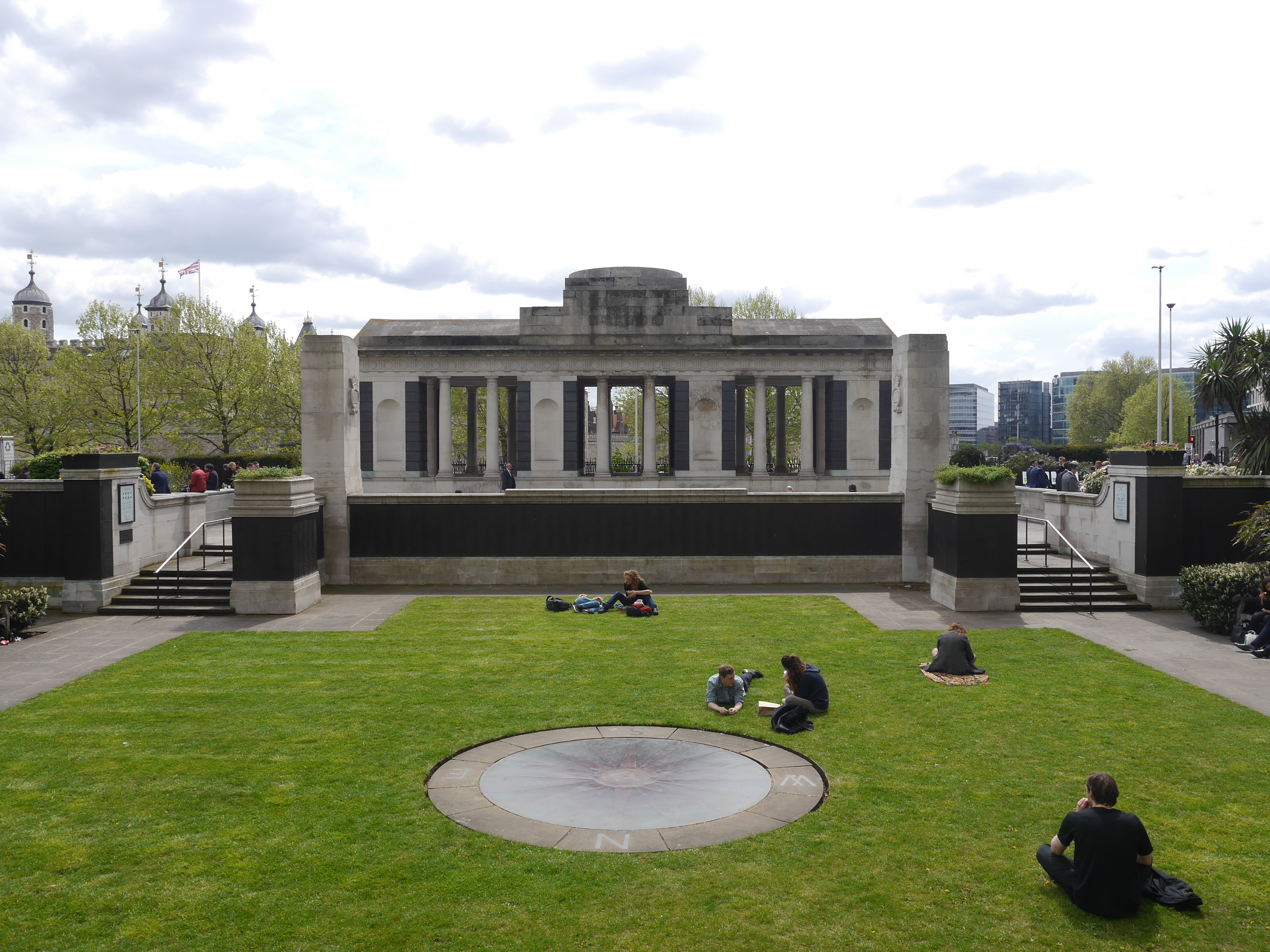
The north side of the colonnade and the entrance to the sunken garden. The bronze "pool and compass" is in the foreground.

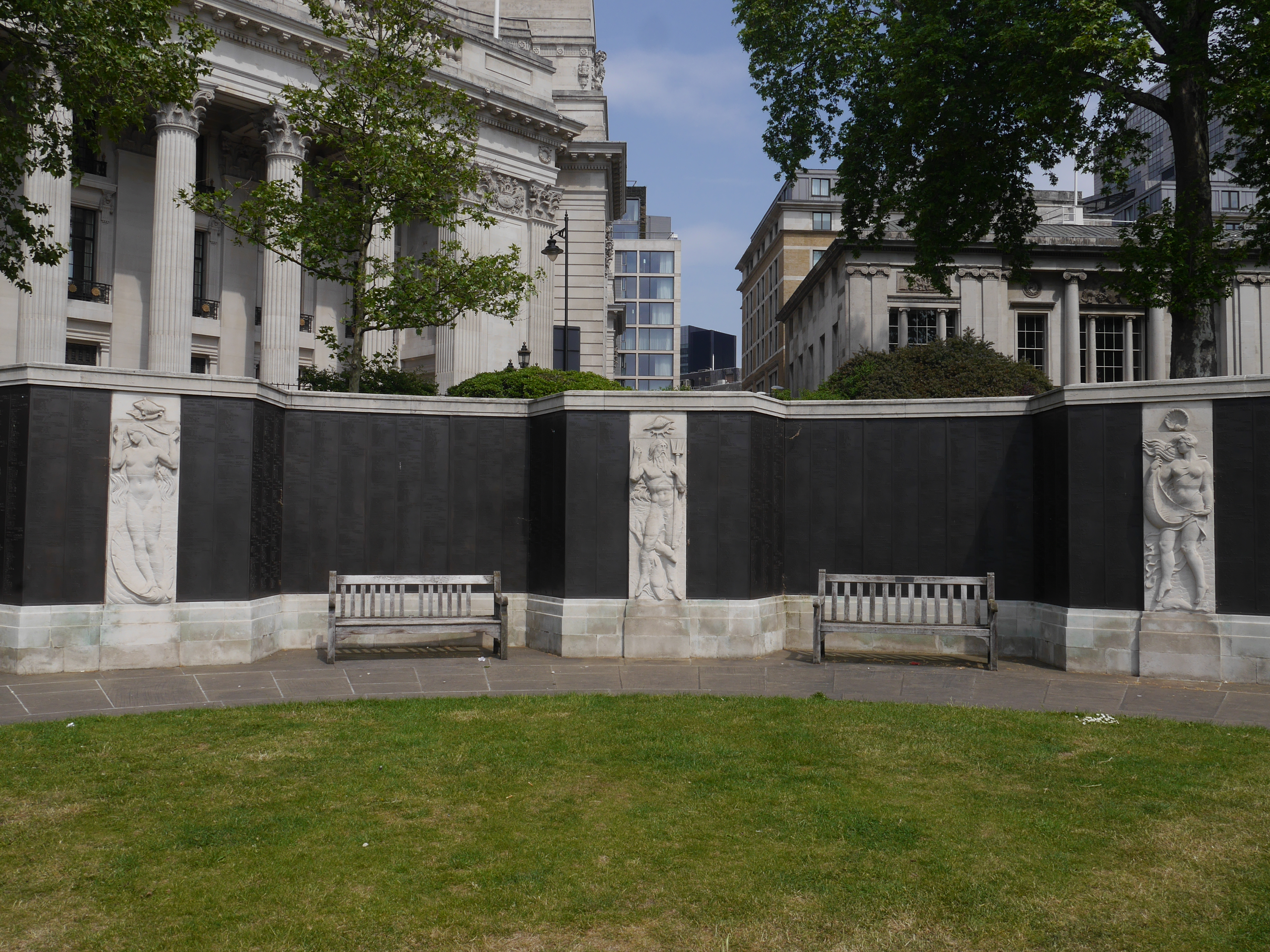
The walls at the north end of the sunken garden; the bronze panels contain the names of the dead. Three of Charles Wheeler's sculptures of the Seven Seas are visible.

=== Background ===
From the outbreak of the Second World War, shipping losses were again high and a similar convoy system was used in an effort to protect merchant vessels. By the war's end, 4,786 ships had been sunk, with the loss of some 32,000 lives (of which almost 24,000 are commemorated at Tower Hill); almost a quarter of the losses were in British waters. Although military casualties were lower in the Second World War than in the First, civilian casualties were higher and there was widespread destruction of British cities. By the end of the second war there was little appetite or money for another wave of large memorials. Instead, many memorials from the first war were adapted or expanded to commemorate the new casualties—an approach the IWGC took at Tower Hill and elsewhere. Generally, it only built new memorials to the missing in places which had not been touched by the First World War. The IWGC was by this time a much more established and well-respected institution and thus found it easier to obtain the agreements and public support necessary for its work.

The architect was Edward Maufe, who began his career designing churches and by the 1950s was the IWGC's principal architect for the United Kingdom for the Second World War commemorations. Maufe was also responsible for the Air Forces Memorial in Surrey and extensions to the Plymouth, Portsmouth, and Chatham naval memorials.

=== History ===
Merchant Navy Memorial Act 1952
- Act of Parliament
- Parliament of the United Kingdom
- Long title: An Act to confer further powers on the Imperial War Graves Commission with respect to the construction of a memorial at Tower Hill to officers and men of the Merchant Navy who perished in the recent world war and for other purposes.
- Citation: 15 & 16 Geo. 6 & 1 Eliz. 2. c. xv

Dates
- Royal assent: 9 July 1952

Text of statute as originally enacted

Following the Second World War, the IWGC considered various sites for a memorial to the new casualties but, after consultation with the relevant public bodies, decided Tower Hill was the most appropriate location. The commission briefed Maufe that the new memorial should complement Lutyens' design and fit in with the existing architecture in the area, including the Port of London Authority building. Maufe first proposed extending Lutyens' structure with a further colonnade, but this was rejected. His next design, for a sunken garden, was accepted. Another act of Parliament was required, which was passed in July 1952 as the Merchant Navy Memorial Act 1952 (15 & 16 Geo. 6 & 1 Eliz. 2. c. xv). Work began later in 1952 and was completed in 1955. Some modifications to Maufe's design were necessary. Maufe initially planned a larger grassy area between Lutyens' colonnade and the sunken garden with a Stone of Remembrance at the centre. The stone was eliminated and the grass scaled back to reduce the overall size of the memorial and assuage the concerns of local people. The depth of the garden had to be reduced at the south end because of a London Underground tunnel.

The memorial commemorates merchant seamen from ships registered in Britain or its Empire or on loan to the governments of those countries, and who were lost at sea as a result of enemy action in the Second World War; it lists 23,765 men, of whom 832 were fishermen and 80 maritime pilots and lighthousemen. The much larger casualty figures and corresponding scale of the memorial reflect the vital contribution of the Merchant Navy to the British war effort in the Second World War. The memorial was unveiled by Queen Elizabeth II at a modest ceremony on 5 November 1955, two days before Remembrance Sunday. The ceremony, described by The Sunday Times as "all as modest and anonymous as the Merchant Navy itself", concluded with the sounding of the "Last Post" by buglers from the Royal Marines, answered by a single ship's horn on the River Thames. After the unveiling, 16,000 relatives of those commemorated on the memorial laid flowers around it, a process which lasted until late in the evening.

=== Design ===
The Second World War memorial takes the form of a semi-circular sunken garden located behind the First World War Memorial, to its north in Trinity Square Gardens. The idea of a sunken garden appears to have originated from discussions immediately following the end of the war. There was a feeling among the new generation of artists and architects that the elaborate and artistic memorials to the First World War did not capture the national mood of mourning for the new wave of casualties and that spaces such as gardens, which provided a location for individual mourning and reflection, were more suitable. According to the architectural historian Philip Ward-Jackson, Maufe's memorial gives the impression of being a wing of an imaginary ruined church, complete with provided seats—an image which would have had "powerful resonance in the bombed City" (much of the surrounding area, including the Port of London Authority building, was severely damaged by German bombing). The architectural historian Nikolaus Pevsner described Maufe's extension as "less assertive" than the original memorial; he praised the idea of a memorial to the missing in the form of a void (the sunken garden), but felt it was let down by Wheeler's "strangely jaunty" reliefs between the lists of names.

Sculptures at the entrance to the sunken garden

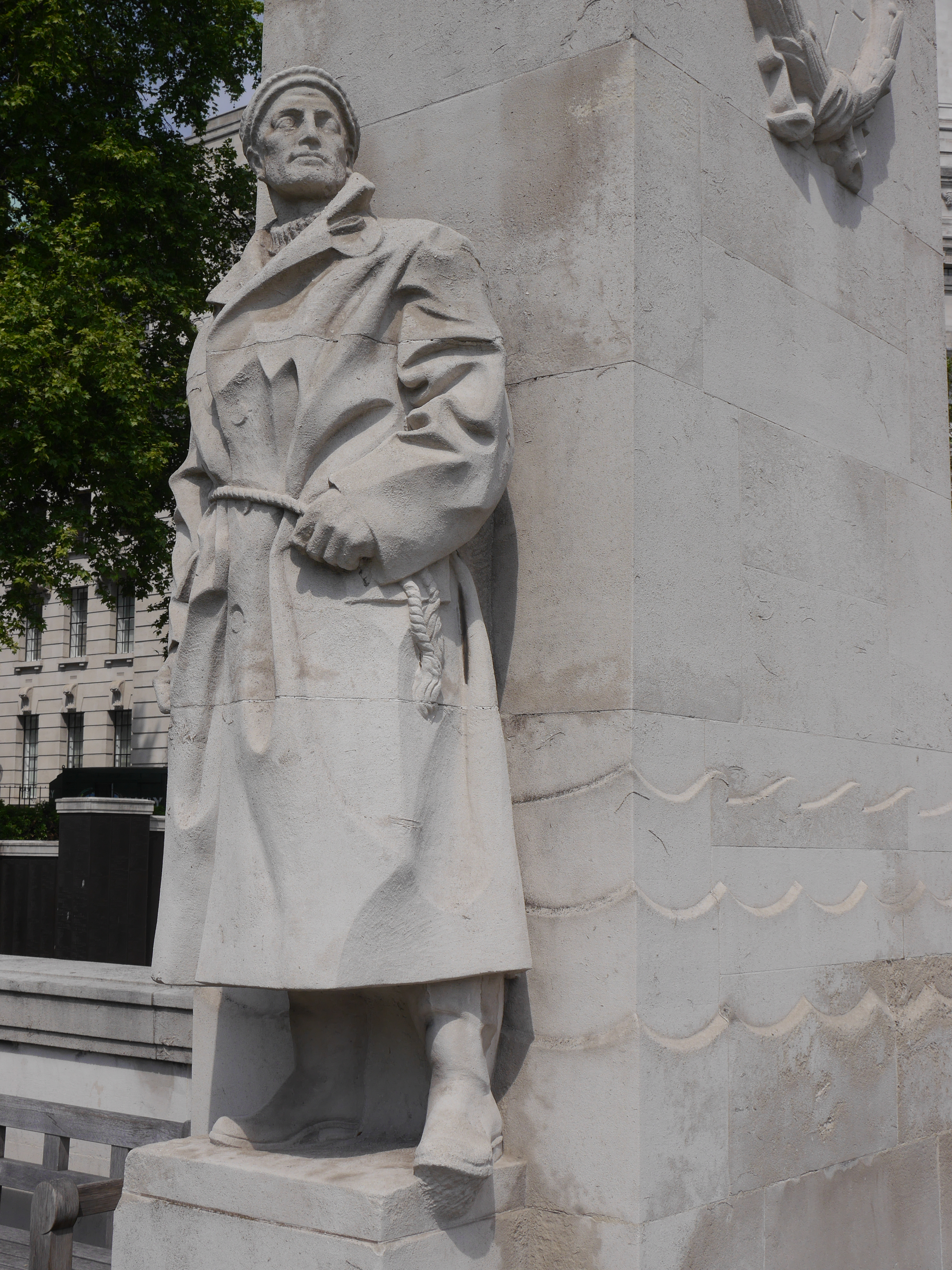
The eastern sentry, a Merchant Navy seaman

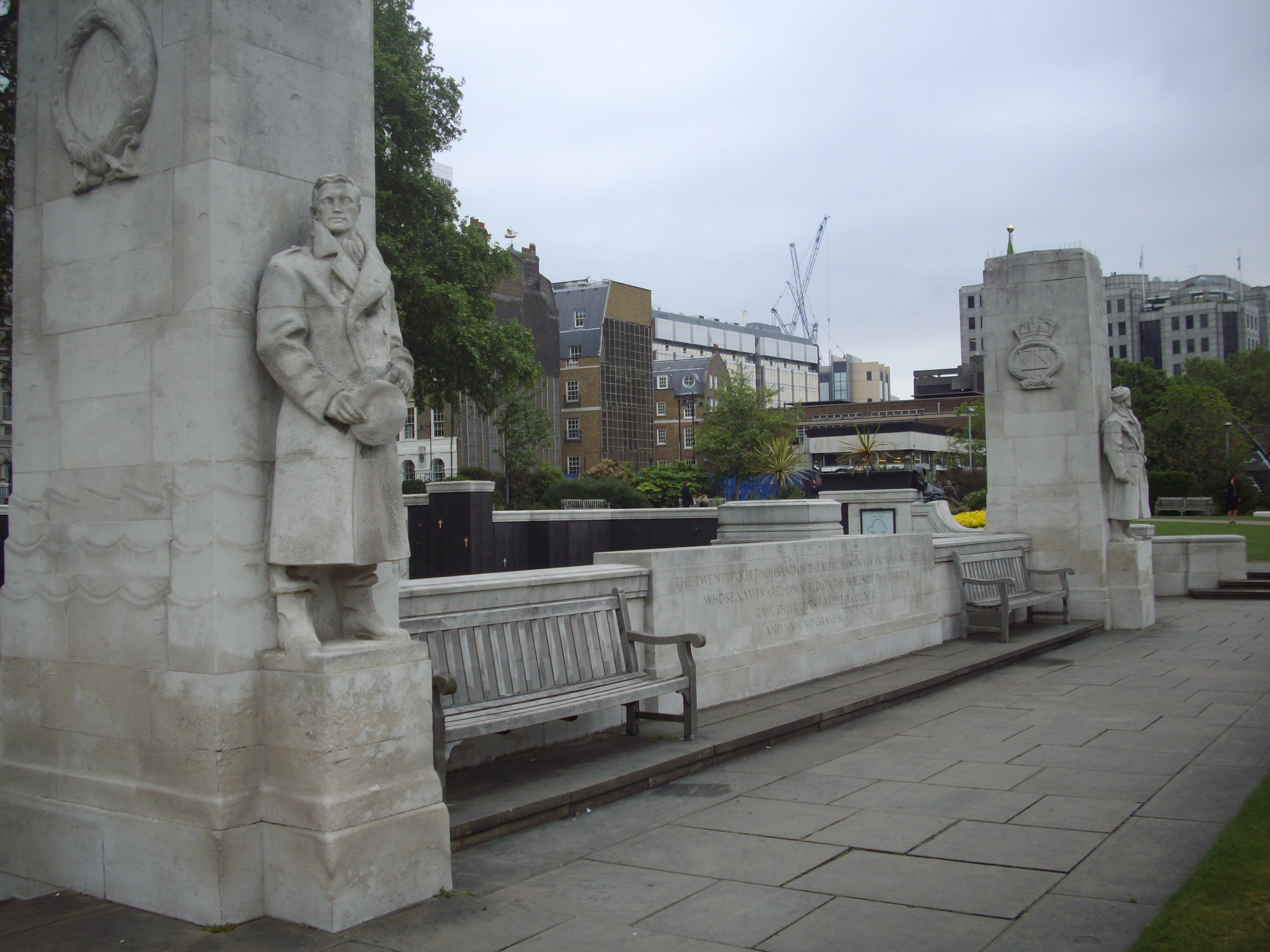
The two sentries flanking the stone bearing the main dedication

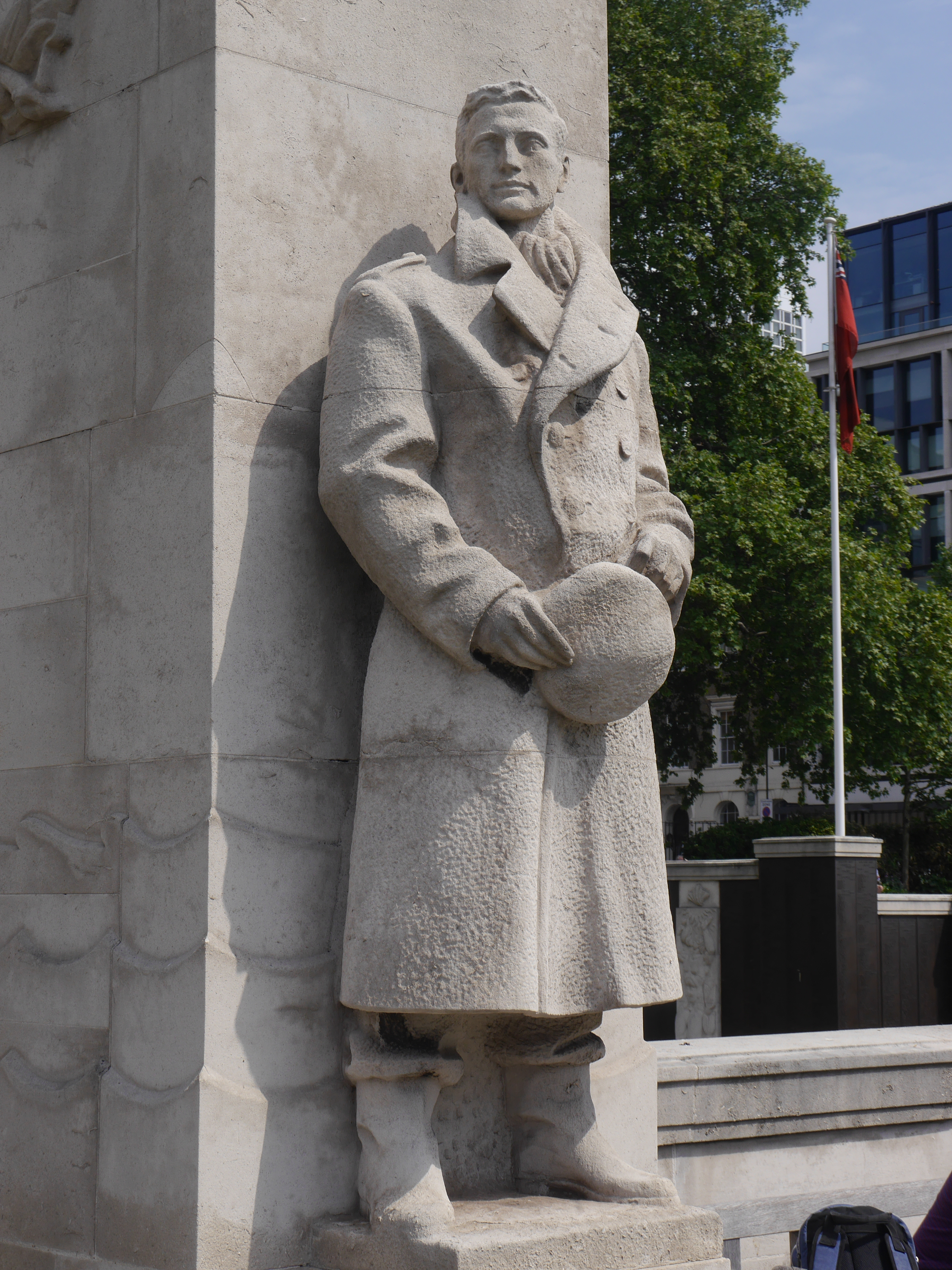
The western sentry, a Merchant Navy officer

The ground-level entrance area to the Second World War memorial is on the southern side of the sunken garden and consists of two pylons flanking a low wall that faces the First World War memorial. Built into the low wall is a stone similar to Lutyens' Stone of Remembrance, which is inscribed with the years of the war (1939–1945) and carries the memorial's dedication: THE TWENTY FOUR THOUSAND OF THE MERCHANT NAVY AND FISHING FLEETS WHOSE NAMES ARE HONOURED ON THE WALLS OF THIS GARDEN GAVE THEIR LIVES FOR THEIR COUNTRY AND HAVE NO GRAVE BUT THE SEA. Each of the flanking pylons supports an over-life-sized statue, representing a Merchant Navy sailor (on the east side) and officer (on the west). The entrance steps either side of the pylons descend to the sunken garden which contains the name panels. The walls of the garden are eight feet (2.4 m) high in Portland stone, to match the original memorial, with the names of the missing from the Second World War listed on 132 bronze panels fixed to the walls. The name panels circle the entire sunken garden, lining both the northern and the southern walls, and the eastern and western walls. Spaced at regular intervals along the semi-circular (northern) part of the memorial are seven allegorical sculptures representing the Seven Seas. These are the work of Charles Wheeler, who also executed the sculptures for Maufe's extensions of the Royal Navy memorials. The garden is mainly grass, with a sculpture of a compass in a 'pool' of bronze, set to magnetic north, in the centre. The Red Ensign (the flag flown by British-registered civilian vessels) flies over the site.

Wheeler's allegorical sculptures representing the Seven Seas

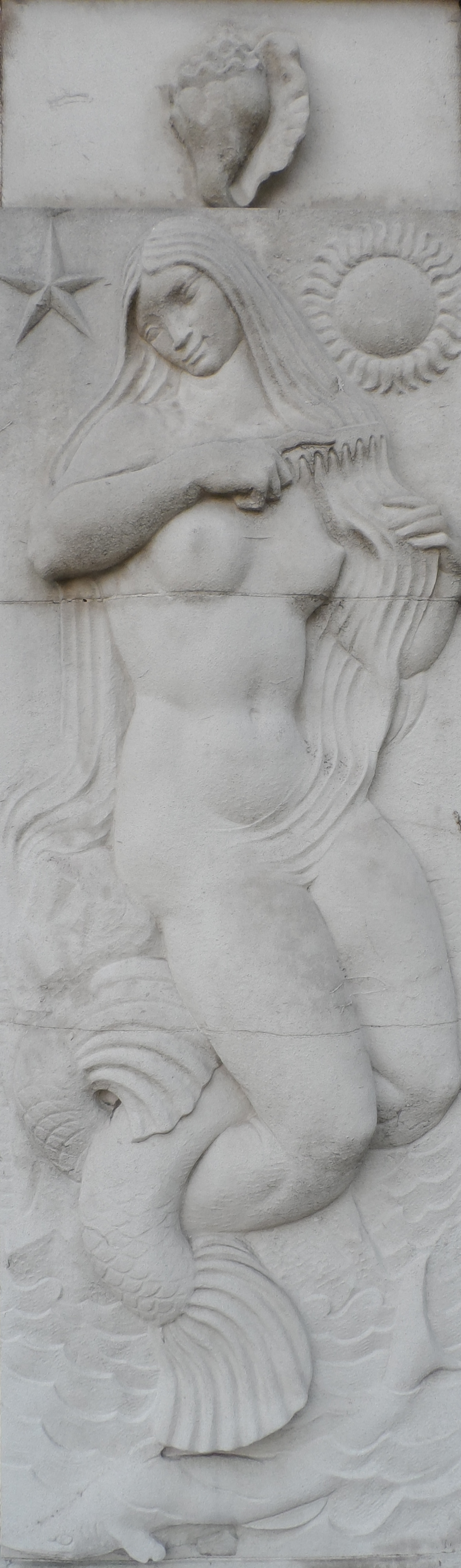

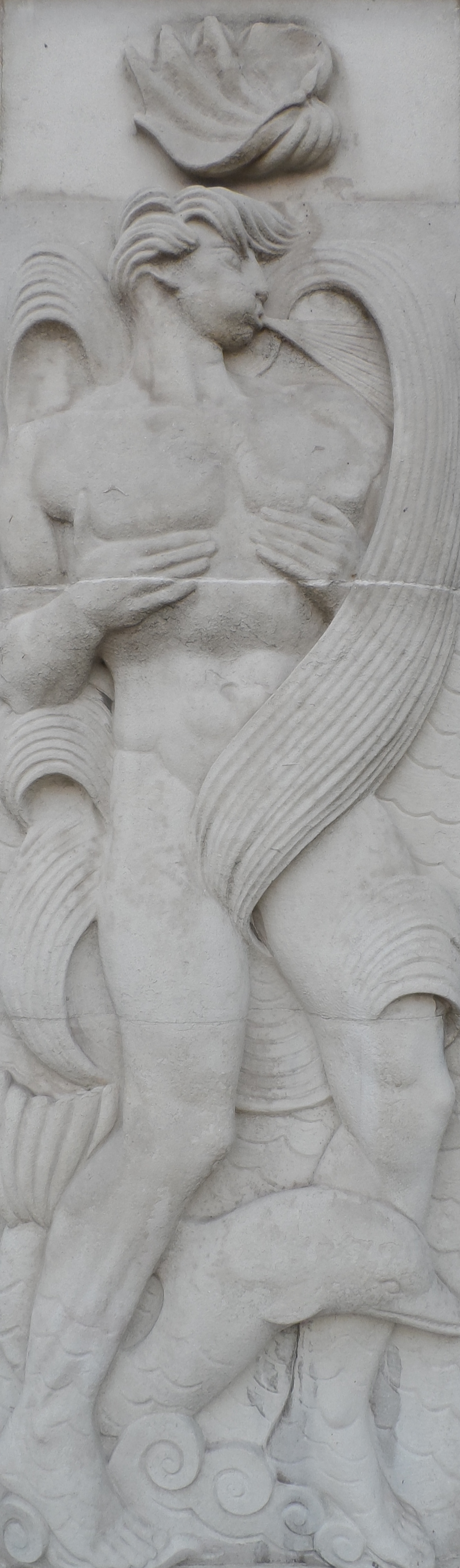

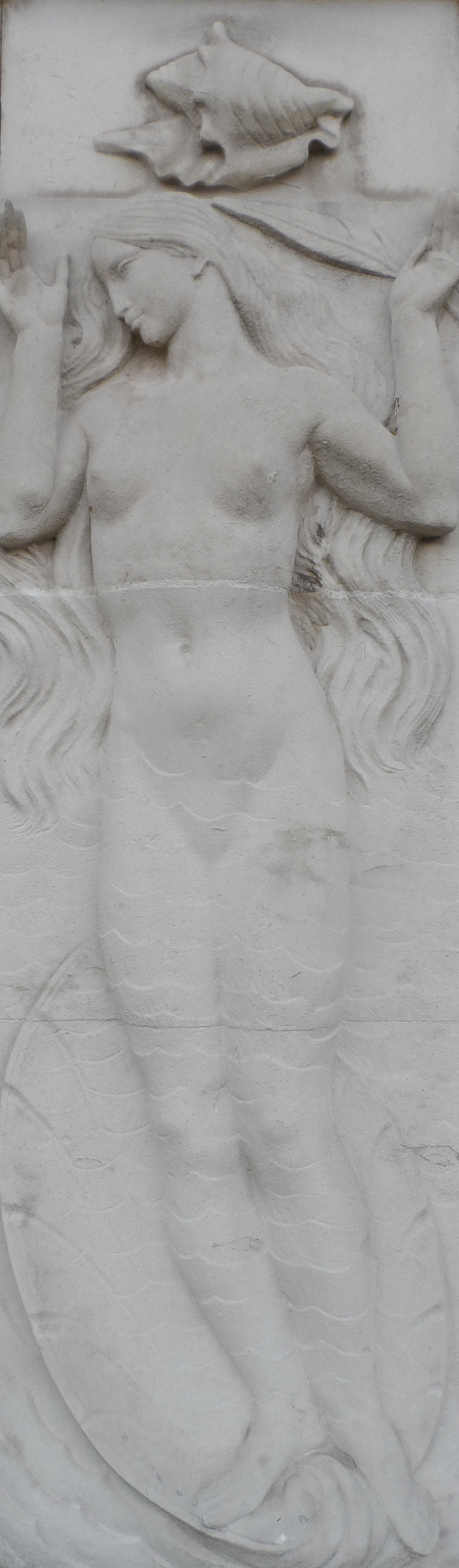

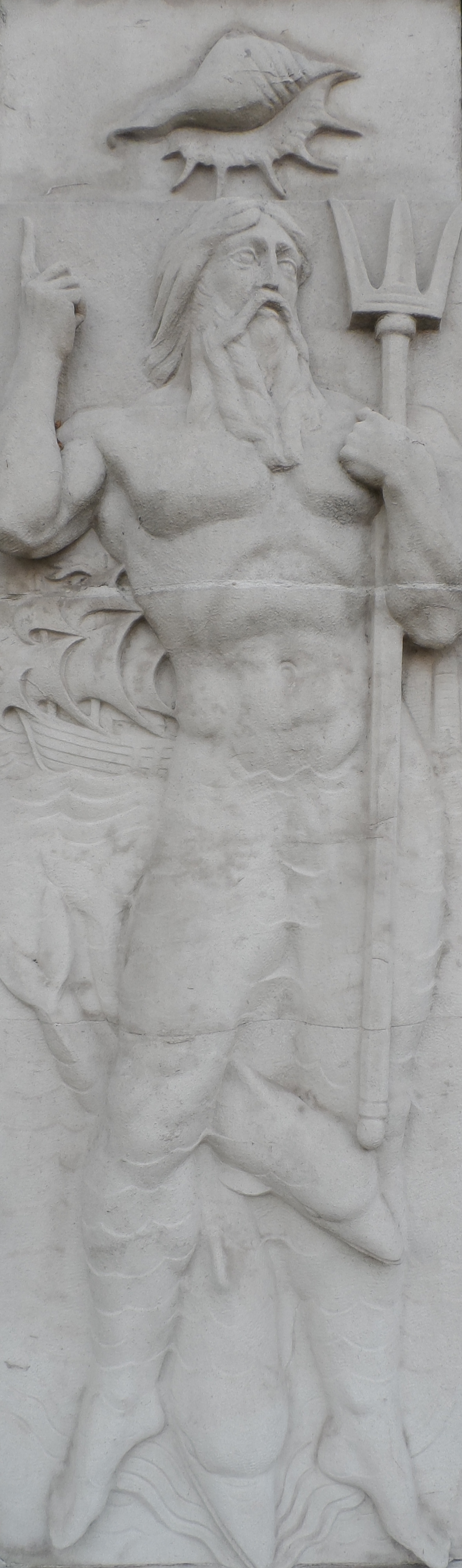

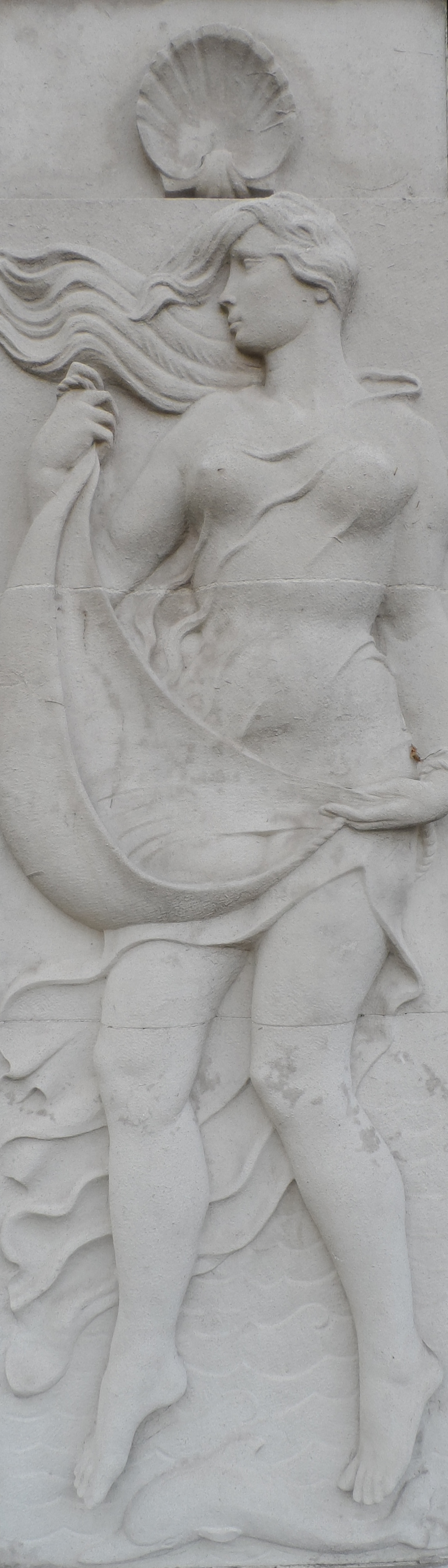

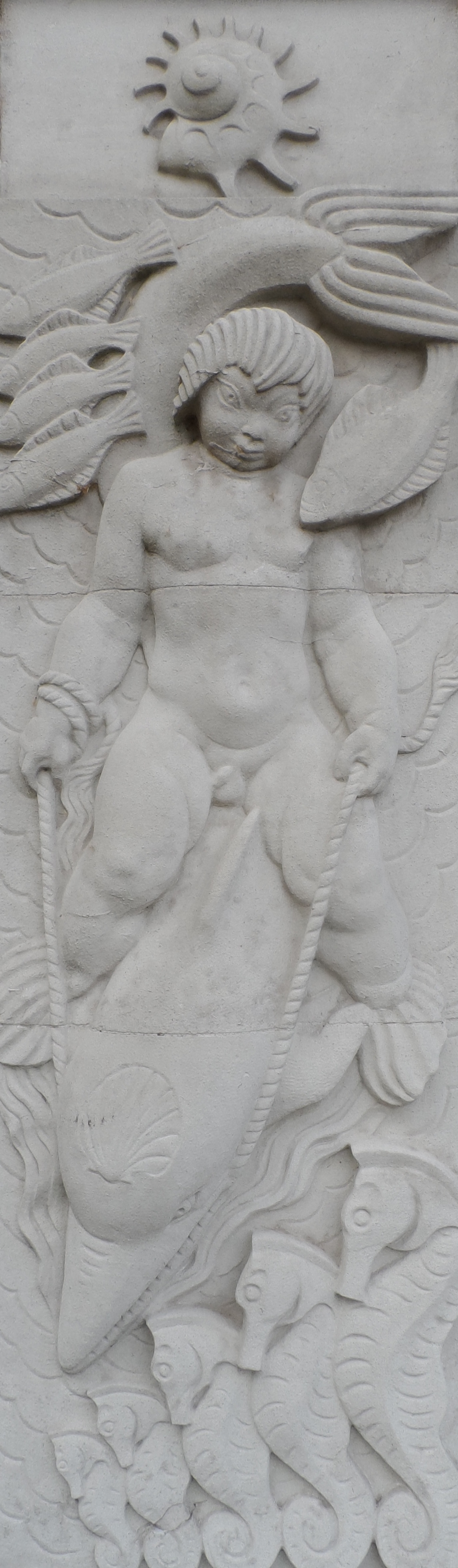

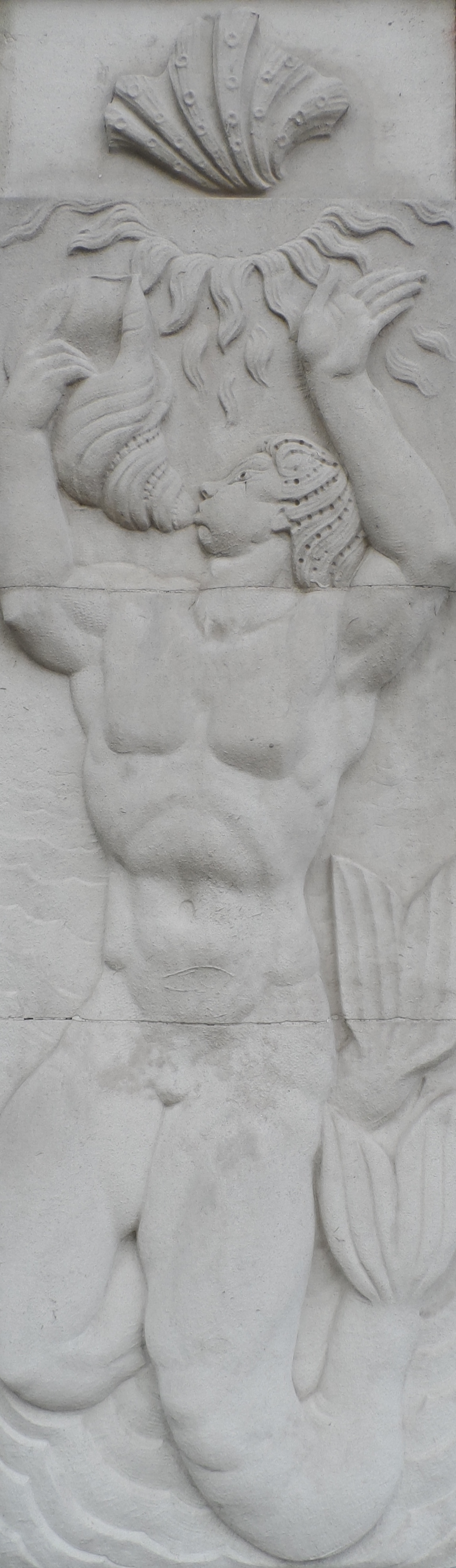

== Later history ==
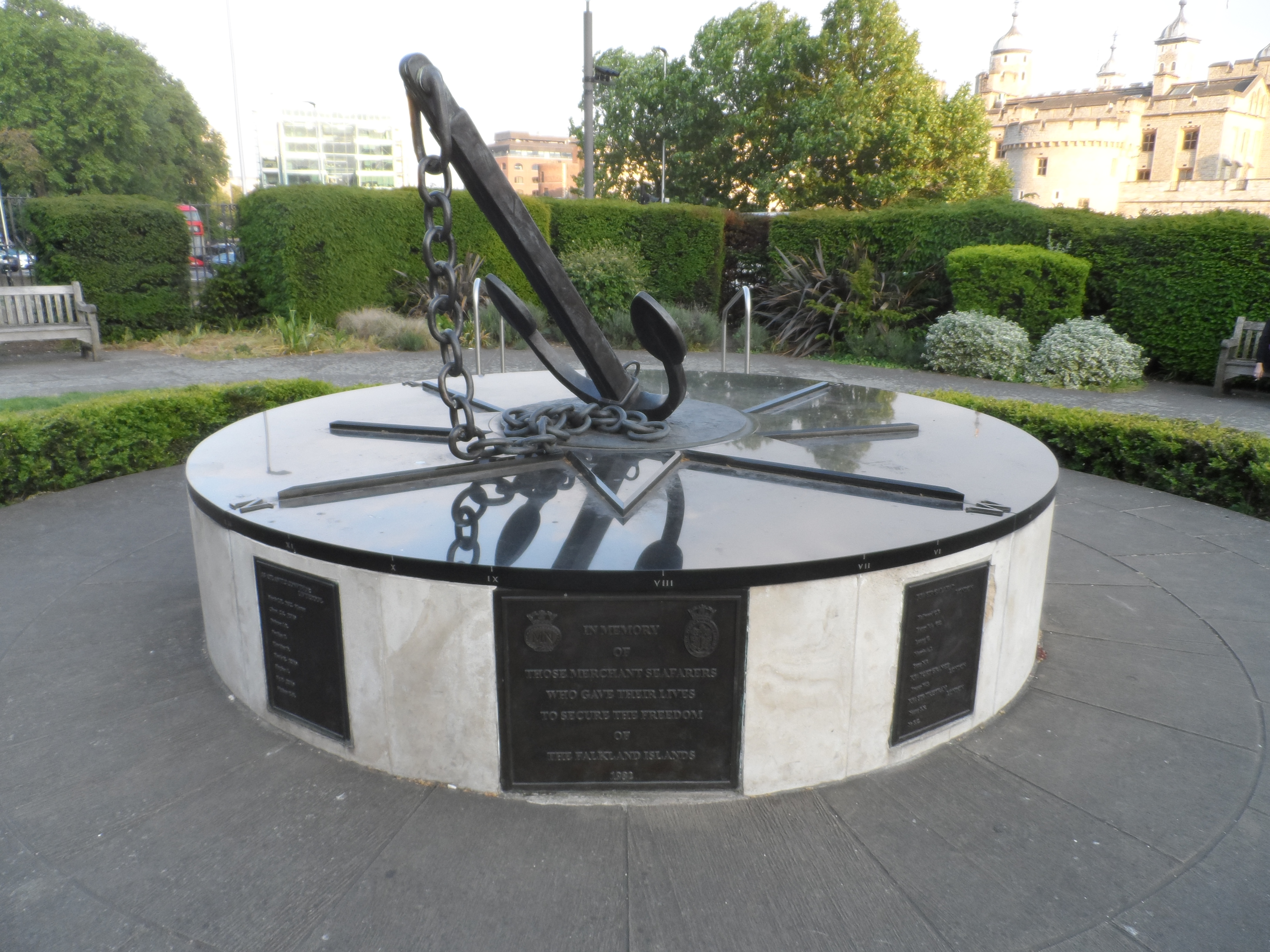
The Falklands War memorial was installed next to the world war memorials in 2005.

The Tower Hill memorial commemorates 36,087 seafarers from both world wars. Only merchant seamen who have no known grave are listed at Tower Hill. Those whose bodies were recovered or who served with other organisations (such as the Indian Merchant Navy) are commemorated elsewhere—for example, 1,200 merchant seamen who served with the Royal Navy during the Second World War are commemorated on the Liverpool Naval Memorial. The memorial register for the Mercantile Marine Memorial was originally published by the IWGC in nine volumes in 1928. After the Second World War, a three-volume Roll of Honour of the Merchant Navy and Fishing Fleets 1939–1945 was produced in 1958 by the Ministry of Transport and Civil Aviation and distributed to a range of organisations in the UK and abroad. The first two volumes of this roll of honour contain the names listed on the Merchant Seamen's Memorial at Tower Hill. The registers for the Tower Hill memorials are held at the nearby Trinity House on the north side of Trinity Square Gardens.

Since 2000, 3 September has been celebrated annually as Merchant Navy Day; a memorial service is held close to that date at the Tower Hill Memorial. In 2005, the Merchant Navy Association unveiled another memorial on the site. The work of Gordon Newton, it is dedicated to the Merchant Navy and Royal Fleet Auxiliary casualties of the 1982 Falklands War. It consists of a 3-metre (9.8-foot) bronze sundial, raised on a granite base; at the dial's centre is a large bronze anchor. Around the base are bronze plaques, one of which contains the inscription IN MEMORY OF THOSE MERCHANT SEAFARERS WHO GAVE THEIR LIVES TO SECURE THE FREEDOM OF THE FALKLAND ISLANDS 1982. The others record the names of the 17 dead, ordered by ship. The Falklands memorial, which is not listed, was unveiled on 4 September 2005 by the First Sea Lord, Admiral Sir Alan West and is maintained by the Commonwealth War Graves Commission (the IWGC having changed its name in 1960).

Liverpool marked the 70th anniversary of the Battle of the Atlantic, the longest continuous military campaign in World War II, by having twenty-five warships sail through the port to mark the milestone. Ceremonies were also held at the Tower Hill Memorial on 11 May 2013, along with other events elsewhere in London and Britain. (Note: According to The Times, a further service was planned for 17 October 2017, organised by several maritime organisations and due to be attended by 400 people, including foreign diplomats and Anne, Princess Royal, to mark 100 years since the introduction of the convoy system. The service was cancelled at short notice as the organisers were unable to obtain permission for a road closure which was required for the event.)

Lutyens' First World War Memorial became a grade II* listed building in 1973. Listed status offers legal protection from demolition or modification; grade II* is reserved for "particularly important buildings of more than special interest" and is applied to about 5.5% of listings. It was upgraded to grade I status (which is applied to around 2.5% of listed buildings, those of "the greatest historic interest") in November 2015 when Lutyens' war memorials were declared a national collection. Maufe's Merchant Seamen's Memorial has separately been a grade II* listed building since 1998. The CWGC began a major restoration project of the colonnade in 2019.

== See also ==
- List of ships named on the Tower Hill Memorial
- Grade I listed war memorials in England
- Grade II* listed war memorials in England
- Grade I and II* listed buildings in the London Borough of Tower Hamlets
- List of Commonwealth War Graves Commission World War I memorials to the missing
- List of Commonwealth War Graves Commission World War II memorials to the missing
