= Counties Ship Management =

British ocean-going merchant company

Counties Ship Management Co Ltd
- Industry: Ship transport
- Founded: 1934
- Founder: Manuel Kulukundis, Basil Mavroleon
- Successor: London & Overseas Freighters
- Headquarters: London

Counties Ship Management Co. Ltd. (CSM) was an ocean-going merchant shipping company based in the United Kingdom. During the Second World War CSM merchant ships made a substantial contribution to supplying the British war effort, at a cost of 13 ships lost and 163 officers and men killed.

== Founding of Rethymnis & Kulukundis ==
In 1920 Manuel Kulukundis (1898–1988) from the Aegean island of Kasos moved to London, England and started work in a shipping office. In 1921 he and his cousin Minas Rethymnis founded the Rethymnis & Kulukundis shipbroking business in London. R&K was nominally a ship management company, but through a network of family and business relationships this was increasingly intertwined with actual ownership by members of the Kulukundis and related families.

== Royal Mail Case ==
The Royal Mail Case criminal prosecution of Lord Kylsant, director of the Royal Mail Steam Packet Company (RMSP), in 1931 led to the liquidation of that company in 1932. RMSP was restructured as Royal Mail Lines and companies connected with it also had to restructure. One of these was Elder Dempster Lines, whose fleet included 24 First World War standard cargo ships that it had to sell quickly and at low cost in order to survive. R&K and its Greek associates bought many of the Elder Dempster ships, and with Greek banks and British shipping companies created a new company called Tramp Ship Development Co Ltd to facilitate this.

R&K also started owning ships in its own right. At first they were registered in Greece, but from 1934 some R&K ships were registered in the UK. R&K gave the ships a "house" image by giving each one a name beginning with "Mount". Their funnels were black with a white band above a blue band, and a five-pointed red star straddling the boundary between the two bands. The white and blue bands denoted R&K's Greek heritage. Other shipping companies had previously used a red star as a badge, notably Robert Kermit Red Star Line (1818–67) and Red Star Line (1871 onwards).

== Growth of Rethymnis & Kulukundis ==
Kulukundis had a Greek ship-owning company, Kulukundis Shipping Co SA, whose ships were managed by R&K. Its ships included the Illinois which it bought from Compagnie Générale Transatlantique in 1934, renamed Mount Pentelikon and registered in Piraeus.

R&K bought old second-hand vessels and established a nominally separate British company to own each ship. Surrey Steamship Co. Ltd. was created to own Box Hill, which Hawthorn Leslie at Hebburn on the River Tyne had built in 1920 as the Glentworth. Sussex Steamship Co. Ltd. was created to own Bury Hill, which had been built by Richardson, Duck and Company at Thornaby-on-Tees in 1917 as the Cardigan. They were followed in 1935 by the First World War standard cargo ship Hampton Hill which had been built in 1919 as War Jasper. Acquisitions in 1936 included two more First World War standard ships: the Campden Hill and the Muneric. Other 1936 acquisitions included Inverleith which had been built as a tanker but converted to a dry cargo ship.

R&K also bought new ships. William Hamilton & Co built Mount Ida for R&K in 1938, who created Atlanticos Steam Ship Co to own her and registered her in Piraeus, Greece. On 9 October 1939 she ran aground on Ower Bank in the North Sea off Norfolk, England. The Cromer Lifeboat HF Bailey rescued all hands but one later died of his injuries.

In 1934 R&K created Counties Ship Management Ltd (CSM) to manage ships owned by both its own companies and others. CSM ships had a buff funnel with a black top, and a red letter "C" inside a red circle on the buff part.

Between 1936 and 1939 CSM companies bought ten second hand dry cargo steamships. Some were old. African Prince was a First World War B type standard merchant ship built in 1917 and became Pentridge Hill under CSM's Dorset Steamship Company in 1936. Clan Macvicar had been built in 1918 and became Dover Hill under CSM in 1936. Others were more modern, such as the 4,318 ton Peebles which had been built by William Doxford & Sons in Sunderland in 1930 and launched as Gracechurch.

CSM continued to create single-ship companies for some of its new acquisitions. Brockley Hill Steamship Co Ltd. was created in 1939 to buy the 5,297 ton Penteli, which had been built by Caird & Co. in Greenock in 1919 as the War Burman. Ernels Shipping Co Ltd. seems to have been created in 1939 to buy the 7,178 ton Canadian Constructor, which had been built for Canadian National Steamships by Halifax Shipyards in Nova Scotia in 1922 and was renamed Argos Hill. Other CSM companies were expanded to own more than one ship.

The majority of CSM's early ships were resold at a profit by 1939. Pentridge Hill, for example, was sold to Sir Wm. Reardon Smith & Sons who renamed her Botlea. Exceptions included Sussex Steamships Co's 4,542 ton Bury Hill which was wrecked off the coast of West Africa in 1936 and Pearlstone which reverted to her owners in 1938. The remaining few ships continued with CSM into the Second World War.

Ship-naming policies varied between the CSM companies. Many had entirely English names, but Akri Hill (built in 1924) referred to the family's Greek background. Argos Hill sounds half-Greek but is in fact a hill in Mayfield, East Sussex, England. All Tower Steamship Co. ship names began with "Tower", such as Tower Bridge and Tower Field. Michael E and Marietta E (see below) were Kulukundis family names.

== CSM's Second World War fleet ==
In 1940 several Kulukundis brothers moved to the safety of the USA, leaving John Kulukundis and his cousin Basil Mavroleon to manage the CSM fleet. From 1940 onwards CSM in turn was controlled by the Ministry of War Transport.

British Government support enabled CSM to acquire new ships instead of second hand ones. Six were completed for CSM in 1940. Kingston Hill, Lulworth Hill, Marietta E and Richmond Hill (II) were new steamships while Putney Hill and Tower Grange were new motor ships. By 1943 all except Richmond Hill had been lost, along with the pre-war second-hand steamships Dover Hill, Mill Hill and Brockley Hill (I).

Three more new steamships were completed for CSM in 1941: Pentridge Hill (II) and the catapult armed merchantmen (CAM ships) Michael E and Primrose Hill (I). Only Pentridge Hill survived the War.

In 1942 William Doxford & Sons in Sunderland built two motor ships for Putney Hill Steamships: Coombe Hill and Tower Hill (II). Both survived the War. CSM made no more acquisitions until 1946.

== War losses ==
CSM sustained heavy war losses in the Second World War, starting with Surrey Steamships Co's 5,677 ton Box Hill which struck a mine on 31 December 1939.

The 4,318 ton Mill Hill was built in 1930 and acquired by CSM in 1936. On 16 August 1940 a U-boat torpedoed her in the North Atlantic. She was laden with pig iron and scrap steel, and quickly sank with the loss of all hands.

The 7,628 ton Kingston Hill was built in December 1940. She was damaged by Luftwaffe bombing in February 1941 but was repaired. She was torpedoed and sunk in June 1941.

The 5,216 ton Putney Hill was completed in 1940. In June 1942 a U-boat sank her with one torpedo and fired 53 rounds from its deck gun.

The 5,226 ton Tower Grange was completed in 1940. A U-boat torpedoed and sank her in November 1942.

The 5,297 ton Brockley Hill was built in 1918. In 1939 CSM set up a one-ship company, Brockley Hill Steamship Co Ltd, to buy her. On 29 June 1941 U-651 torpedoed and sank her. All hands were rescued by another British cargo steamer in the same convoy.

The 4,241 ton Tower Field ran aground and broke in two in 1941. She was salvaged and rebuilt, and the British Ministry of War Transport (MoWT) took her over as Empire Tower. on 5 March 1943 she was torpedoed and sunk.

The 7,628 ton Lulworth Hill was completed in 1940. She was torpedoed by an Italian submarine in March 1943. 14 men had survived the sinking but after 50 days adrift in a liferaft only two were rescued alive.

Two of CSM's 7,628 ton cargo steamers were equipped as CAM ships, each having a catapult on her bow to launch a Hawker Sea Hurricane. Michael E was the UK's first CAM ship, completed in May 1941. She was torpedoed and sunk on her maiden voyage on 2 June 1941. Primrose Hill was completed in September 1941. In October 1942 a German submarine sank her with torpedo and shellfire.

The 7,628 ton Marietta E was completed in June 1940. In March 1943 a U-boat torpedoed and sank her in the Indian Ocean off the coast of South Africa.

The 5,818 ton Clan Macvicar had been completed in 1918. CSM had acquired her in 1936 and renamed her Dover Hill. In February 1943 she was at anchor in northern Russia when a Luftwaffe 500 kg bomb crashed through her decks and buried itself in coal in her bunkers without exploding. Volunteers from her crew took two days and nights to dig 22 feet (6.7 m) down into the coal to reach the bomb, which a Soviet bomb disposal specialist then defused. All 19 volunteers were afterwards decorated for bravery. Dover Hill was salvaged and taken over by the Ministry of War Transport. On 9 June 1944 during the Normandy landings she was scuttled as a Corn Cob block ship for a Gooseberry Harbour.

CSM's final wartime loss was the 7,178 ton refrigerated steamer Argos Hill. She was built in 1922 as Canadian Constructor. Ernels Shipping Co of London bought her in 1939, renamed her Argos Hill and placed her under CSM management. She was damaged in an air raid on Convoy OA 178 on 4 July 1940 but survived and remained in service until after the surrender of Germany. She caught fire on 7 August 1945, just a week before the surrender of Japan, off St. John's, Newfoundland (41°35′N 54°54′W). She was towed into Bay Bulls on 13 August and considered a constructive total loss.

By the end of hostilities CSM had lost 13 ships totalling 81,111 tons, with the deaths of 163 officers and men.

== Post-war development ==
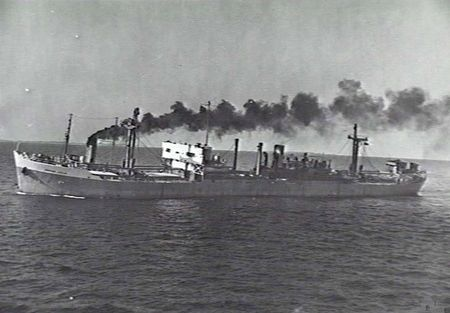
Putney Hill (Formerly Empire Celia) in 1948

In 1946 a CSM company bought Empire Nairobi, a standard Empire ship that had been built by Short Brothers in February 1945. CSM renamed her Dover Hill, after the earlier ship that had survived an unexploded bomb and then been scuttled in the Normandy landings. CSM sold her in 1951 to new owners who renamed her Basil. She changed owners and names several more times before being scrapped in Istanbul in 1968.

Also in 1946 the MoWT placed the Empire Ship Empire Celia under CSM management. In 1948 the MoWT sold her to Putney Hill Steamships who renamed her SS Putney Hill after MV Putney Hill that was sunk in 1942.

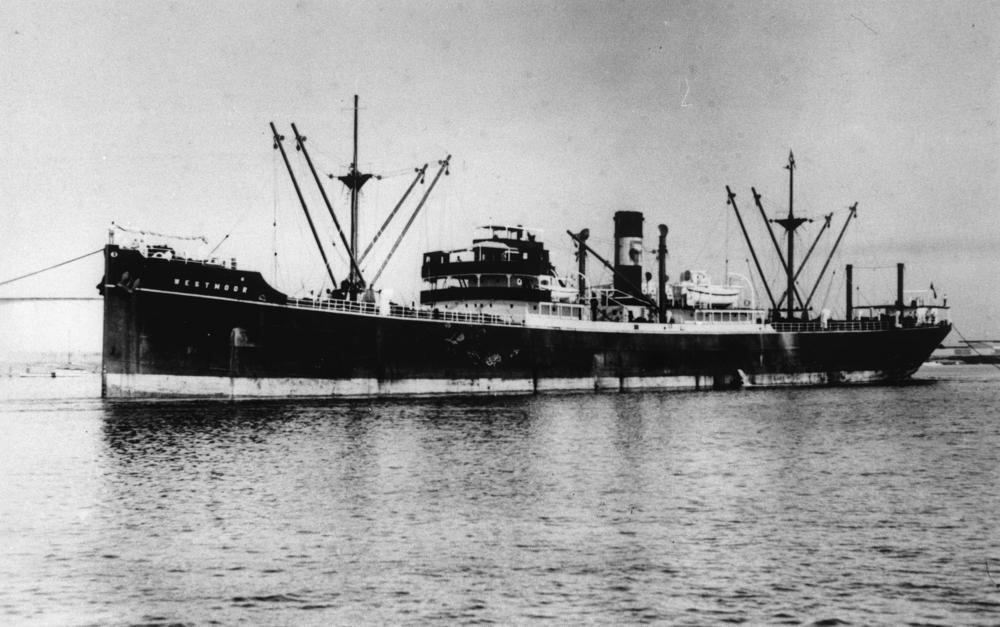
Westmoor, which became Akri Hill

In 1947 Dorset Steamships acquired the Empire ship Empire Mandarin, which the Shipbuilding Corporation Ltd. in Newcastle-upon-Tyne had completed in 1942. Dorset Steamships renamed her Lulworth Hill, replacing an earlier ship of the same name. Also in 1947, Akri Steamships bought Westmoor from Moor Line and renamed her Akri Hill.

In about 1947–48 CSM companies bought seven Liberty ships from the UK Government. None remained under CSM control for very long.

In 1948 seven oil tankers joined the fleet. Cardium, a 1931-built 8,300 ton motor tanker bought from Anglo-Saxon Petroleum, was renamed Hawthorn Hill but the other six tankers were not renamed.

In 1950 the CSM fleet was radically expanded with 34 Canadian "Fort and Park" ships.

== London & Overseas Freighters ==
In 1948 the cousins founded a new company, London & Overseas Freighters Ltd. They intended it to be a tanker company but in 1949–50 it took over ten dry cargo ships from three R&K companies: Dorset Steamship Co Ltd, Putney Hill Steamships Co Ltd and Tower Steamship Co Ltd. In order to give the merged fleets a single "house" identity, in 1950 LOF renamed all of its ships, giving each one a name beginning with "London".

Dorset Steamships' freighter Lulworth Hill (II) became London Builder.

Richmond Hill (II), built in 1940 by Bartram & Sons in Sunderland for Putney Hill Steamships became the London Craftsman. The Pentridge Hill (II), built in 1941 by Bartram & Sons for Dorset Steamships, became the London Dealer.

The freighters Coombe Hill and Tower Hill (II) became LOF's London Artisan and London Banker respectively.

Another Dorset Steamships' vessel, Charmouth Hill, which became LOF's London Mariner in 1950, had been completed in Hartlepool in 1943 as the Empire Peak. Tower Steamships' Tower Grange, which became LOF's London Trader, had been completed by the Shipbuilding Corporation Ltd. in 1945 as the Empire Morley.

Putney Hill Steamships' Putney Hill (II) was transferred to LOF but confusingly was at first renamed Castle Hill. In 1950 LOF renamed her again as London Statesman. In 1951 LOF sold her to Panamanian owners who renamed her Morella.

Three Liberty ships were transferred to LOF. Samflora, which CSM had renamed Primrose Hill (II), was built in 1943. When transferred to LOF she was renamed London Vendor. LOF sold her in 1952 and she was subsequently renamed several more times. She was scrapped at Onomichi, Japan in 1968. Samdon, also built in 1943, had become the Mill Hill with CSM, and unlike other transferred ships retained her CSM name with LOF. LOF sold her in 1951 and her subsequent owners renamed her Educator. Samleven had been built in 1944 and sold in 1947 to a CSM company, Tramp Shipping Development Co, which renamed her Bisham Hill. She was transferred to LOF in October 1951 and sold in January 1952 to Liberian owners wno renamed her Nausica.

== CSM after 1950 ==
In 1950 the CSM fleet was radically expanded with 34 Canadian "Fort and Park" ships. However, during the 1950s LOF became the Kulukundis family's main shipping company and the CSM fleet was reduced in size. Dover Hill (II) was sold in 1951. CSM's last wartime standard cargo ship was Denmark Hill, which had been built as the "Fort" ship Fort Mattagami and was sold for scrap in 1968.

In 1966 CSM took over a modern dry cargo ship. Clarkspey had been built in 1960, but had been bareboat chartered to Port Line who renamed her Port Campbell. When her charter expired CSM bought her and renamed her Kings Reach. CSM sold her in 1970.

== Sources & further reading ==
- Sedgwick, Stanley; Kinnaird, Mark; O'Donoghue, K.J. (1993) [1992]. London & Overseas Freighters, 1948–92: A Short History. World Ship Society. ISBN 0-905617-68-1.
- Sedgwick, Stanley; Sprake, R.F. (1977). London & Overseas Freighters Limited 1949–1977. World Ship Society. ISBN 0905617037.
- Slader, John (1988). The Red Duster at War. London: William Kimber & Co Ltd. pp. 55, 63, 143–144, 241, 278. ISBN 0-7183-0679-1.
- Talbot-Booth, E.C. (1942) [1936]. Ships and the Sea (7th ed.). London: Sampson Low, Marston & Co Ltd.
