= SS Gracechurch =

British cargo ship built by William Doxford & Sons in 1930

Coordinates: 58.48°N 06.49°W

History

United Kingdom
- Name: Gracechurch
- Owner: Gracechurch Shipping Co.
- Operator: James, Muers & Co.
- Port of registry: (United Kingdom) London
- Builder: William Doxford & Sons, Sunderland
- Launched: 25 February 1930
- Completed: April 1930
- Out of service: 1933
- Identification: Code Letters LFSR; UK official number 161390
- Fate: Sold
- Name: Peebles
- Owner: B.J. Sutherland & Co
- Operator: B.J. Sutherland & Co
- Port of registry: (United Kingdom) Newcastle-upon-Tyne
- Acquired: 1933
- Out of service: 1936
- Fate: Sold
- Name: Mill Hill
- Namesake: Mill Hill, north London
- Owner: Mill Hill Steam Ship Co, Ltd.
- Operator: Counties Ship Management Co Ltd, London
- Port of registry: (United Kingdom) Newcastle-upon-Tyne
- Acquired: 1936
- Identification: Call sign GTJL; UK official number 161390
- Fate: Sunk by torpedo 30 August 1940

General characteristics
- Type: Cargo ship
- Tonnage: 4,318 GRT; tonnage under deck 4,025; 2,600 NRT
- Length: 320.4 ft (97.7 m)
- Beam: 52.9 ft (16.1 m)
- Height: 24.9 ft (7.6 m)
- Installed power: 368 NHP
- Propulsion: 3-cylinder triple expansion steam engine; single screw
- Crew: 34

SS Gracechurch was a United Kingdom 4,318 GRT cargo ship built by William Doxford & Sons at Pallion on Wearside in 1930. She twice changed owners and names, becoming SS Peebles in 1933 and SS Mill Hill in 1936. She was sunk by a German submarine in August 1940.

== Engines ==
The ship had nine corrugated furnaces with a combined grate area of 187 square feet (17 m^{2}) feeding three 180 psi (1,200 kPa) single-ended boilers with a combined heating surface of 6,105 square feet (567 m^{2}).

== Names and owners ==
Gracechurch was first owned by Gracechurch Shipping Co of Newcastle and managed by James, Muers & Co of Cardiff. In 1933 she was sold to B.J. Sutherland & Co who renamed her Peebles.

In 1936 she was sold to the Mill Hill Steam Ship Co Ltd, which was controlled by Counties Ship Management (an offshoot of the Rethymnis & Kulukundis shipbroking company of London) who renamed her Mill Hill.

== Loss ==
Approximate position of Gracechurch's wreck

On 16 August 1940 Mill Hill left Halifax, Nova Scotia as a member of convoy HX 66A laden with pig iron and scrap steel for Middlesbrough, England. Between 0220 and 0248 hrs on 30 August 58 miles off Cape Wrath in the north of Scotland U-32 torpedoed the convoy, sinking three ships. One was Mill Hill, which sank within a few minutes with the loss of all hands.

== Replacement ships ==
Gracechurch was the third of four ships that B.J. Sutherland & Co named Peebles. When Sutherland sold her in 1936, William Doxford & Sons completed a new 4,982-ton cargo ship MV Peebles for Sutherland. She survived the Second World War and in 1951 Sutherland sold her to Westralian Farmers Transport who renamed her Swanstream. In 1957 Westralian sold to J. Manners & Co. of Hong Kong who renamed her San Fernando. In 1965 Manners sold to her to Yong & Lee Timber who renamed her Phoenician Star. She was scrapped at Hong Kong in 1967.

Gracechurch was the first of two ships that Counties Ship Management named Mill Hill. In 1947 CSM bought the 7,219-ton Liberty ship SS Samdon and renamed her SS Mill Hill. Samdon had been built by New England Shipbuilding Corporation of Portland, Maine in 1943. In 1949 she was transferred from CSM to a new Rethymnis and Kulukundis company, London and Overseas Freighters, retaining the name Mill Hill. In 1951 LOF sold her to new owners who renamed her Educator. She was scrapped in Philadelphia, Pennsylvania in 1961.

== Sources & further reading ==
- Sedgwick, Stanley (1993) [1992]. Kinnaird, Mark; O'Donoghue, K.J. (eds.). London & Overseas Freighters, 1948-92: A Short History. World Ship Society. ISBN 0-905617-68-1.
- Sedgwick, Stanley; Sprake, R.F. (1977). London & Overseas Freighters Limited 1949-1977. World Ship Society. ISBN 0905617037.
- Slader, John (1988). The Red Duster at War. London: William Kimber & Co Ltd. p. 63. ISBN 0-7183-0679-1.
