= Putney Hill =

Putney Hill may refer to:

== Places ==
- Putney Hill, a district of Putney in southwest London, England

== Ships ==
- MV Putney Hill, a British cargo ship built in 1940 and sunk that same year
- SS Putney Hill, a British cargo ship in service 1948-49
