= London Statesman =

London Statesman has been the name of two cargo ships owned by London and Overseas Freighters:

- SS London Statesman – built in 1943, acquired to LOF and renamed London Statesman in 1950, sold and renamed in 1951 and scrapped in 1966.
- MV London Statesman – built in 1963, sold and renamed in 1979, hit by an Iraqi Exocet missile in 1984 and subsequently scrapped.
