= MV Tower Grange =

Cargo ship built in 1940

Coordinates: 06.20°N 49.10°W

History

United Kingdom
- Name: MV Tower Grange
- Owner: Tower Steamships Co Ltd
- Operator: Counties Ship Management Co Ltd, London
- Builder: William Doxford & Sons, Sunderland
- Launched: 22 June 1940
- Completed: July 1940
- Homeport: London
- Identification: UK official number 167617; Call sign GMJW
- Fate: Sunk by torpedo 18 November 1942

General characteristics
- Type: Cargo ship
- Tonnage: 5,226 GRT; tonnage under deck 4,685; 3,072 NRT
- Length: 427.6 ft (130.3 m)
- Beam: 56.5 ft (17.2 m)
- Draught: 26 ft 10 3/4 in (8.20 m)
- Depth: 26.5 ft (8.1 m)
- Installed power: 516 NHP
- Propulsion: 3-cylinder single-acting two-stroke diesel engine driving a single screw
- Crew: 47
- Notes: sister ship: Putney Hill

MV Tower Grange was a cargo ship completed by William Doxford & Sons Ltd in Sunderland in 1940. She was owned by Tower Steamships Co Ltd and managed by Counties Ship Management Co Ltd of London (CSM), both of which were offshoots of the Rethymnis & Kulukundis shipbroking company. Tower Grange was a sister ship of MV Putney Hill, which Doxford built in the same year for another CSM company, Putney Hill Steamships Co Ltd.

== Sinking ==
In 1942 Tower Grange under Captain William Henry Williamson had sailed from Calcutta bound for Trinidad and the UK with a mixed cargo of 8,332 tons including 1,800 tons of manganese ore. She called at Cape Town on 27 October. At 0834 hrs on 17 November the German submarine U-154 sighted her sailing unescorted in the western Atlantic, but Tower Grange steered a zigzag course that prevented attack. At 0639 hrs the next morning U-154 fired a spread of three torpedoes but Tower Grange evaded them. At 0701 hrs U-154 fired a second spread, two of which hit Tower Grange, killing four crew and two DEMS gunners and sinking her about 250 miles northeast of Cayenne, French Guiana.

Approximate position of Putney Hill's wreck

Tower Grange's survivors abandoned ship but the lifeboats became separated. After six days the Anchor Line cargo steamship Castalia rescued Captain Williamson and 29 crew on 23 November and landed them on Trinidad four days later. Two days later the Scottish cargo steamship Baron Belhaven rescued the First Officer and ten other survivors on 25 November and took them to Trinidad.

== Replacement ship ==
In 1947 Tower Steamships bought the 1944-built Empire ship Empire Morley and renamed her Tower Grange. In 1959 she was transferred to a new Rethymnis & Kulukundis Company, London & Overseas Freighters, who renamed her London Trader. In 1950 LOF sold her to new owners who registered her under the Panamanian flag of convenience as Nico. She was scrapped in Etajima, Japan in 1969.

== Sources & further reading ==
- Sedgwick, Stanley (1993) [1992]. Kinnaird, Mark; O'Donoghue, K.J. (eds.). London & Overseas Freighters, 1948–92: A Short History. Kendal: World Ship Society. ISBN 0-905617-68-1.
- Sedgwick, Stanley; Sprake, R.F. (1977). London & Overseas Freighters Limited 1949–1977. Kendal: World Ship Society. ISBN 0905617037.
