= SS Glentworth =

1920 Cargo steam engine ship

History

United Kingdom
- Name: SS Glentworth
- Owner: Dalgliesh Steam Shipping Co. Ltd., Newcastle-upon-Tyne
- Port of registry: (United Kingdom) Newcastle-upon-Tyne
- Builder: Hawthorn Leslie & Co, Newcastle-upon-Tyne
- Yard number: 490
- Launched: 15 July 1920
- Completed: November 1920
- Out of service: 1934
- Identification: UK official number 144931; code letters KHCD
- Fate: Sold
- Name: SS Box Hill
- Namesake: Box Hill, Surrey
- Owner: Surrey Hill Steamship Co. Ltd.
- Operator: Counties Ship Management Co Ltd, London
- Port of registry: (United Kingdom) London
- Acquired: 1934
- Out of service: 31 December 1939
- Identification: UK official number 144931; Call sign GDWN
- Fate: Sunk by mine

General characteristics
- Class & type: Cargo ship
- Tonnage: 5,677 GRT; tonnage under deck 5,310; 3,510 NRT
- Length: 450.0 ft (137.2 m) p/p
- Beam: 55.0 ft (16.8 m)
- Draught: 25 feet 6 1/4 inches (7.78 m)
- Depth: 26.4 ft (8.0 m)
- Installed power: 620 NHP (as built); 586 NHP (after 1934)
- Propulsion: Hawthorn Leslie reduction-geared turbine (as built); Hawthorn Leslie 3-cylinder triple expansion steam engine (after 1934)
- Speed: 11 knots (20 km/h)
- Crew: 20 or 22

SS Glentworth was a shelter deck cargo steamship built in 1920 by Hawthorn Leslie & Co. in Newcastle-upon-Tyne, England for R.S. Dalgliesh and Dalgliesh Steam Shipping Co. Ltd., also of Newcastle-upon-Tyne. After the Great Depression affected UK merchant shipping in the first years of the 1930s, Dalgliesh sold Glentworth to a company controlled by Counties Ship Management (an offshoot of the Rethymnis & Kulukundis shipbroking company of London) who renamed her SS Box Hill.

== Details ==
The ship's stokehold had 12 corrugated furnaces with a combined grate area of 214 square feet (20 m^{2}). They heated three 200 lb_{f}/in^{2} single-ended boilers with a combined heating surface of 8,655 square feet (804 m^{2}). She was built as a turbine steamer: two steam turbines with a combined power output of 620 NHP drove the shaft to the single propeller by reduction gearing. However, when she changed hands in 1934 she was re-engined with a Hawthorn Leslie 586 NHP three-cylinder triple expansion steam engine. The conversion retained her original boilers, but her furnaces were converted to oil burning.

The ship was equipped with direction finding equipment and radio.

== Loss ==
Late in 1939 Box Hill sailed from Saint John, New Brunswick bound for Hull with a cargo of 8,452 tons wheat. On New Year's Eve she was in the North Sea 9 nautical miles (17 km) off the Humber lightship when she struck a German mine. The explosion broke her back and she sank almost immediately with the loss of over half its crew.

Box Hill was Counties Ship Management's first loss of the Second World War. CSM's losses continued until just a week before the surrender of Japan in August 1945, by which time the company had lost a total of 13 ships.

Both sections of Box Hill's wreck were a hazard to shipping and showed above the water. In 1952 the Royal Navy dispersed her remains with high explosive and Admiralty charts now mark her position as a "foul" ground.

== Sources & further reading ==
- Sedgwick, Stanley (1993) [1992]. Kinnaird, Mark; O'Donoghue, K.J (eds.). London & Overseas Freighters, 1948–92: A Short History. World Ship Society. ISBN 0-905617-68-1.
- Sedgwick, Stanley; Sprake, R.F. (1977). London & Overseas Freighters Limited 1949–1977. World Ship Society. ISBN 0905617037.
