= Statesman (disambiguation) =

A statesman is someone who practices statecraft.

Statesman or statesmen may also refer to:

== Newspapers ==
=== United States ===
- The Statesman (Denver, Colorado), early name of the Denver Star, a defunct African American weekly newspaper published in Denver, Colorado
- The Statesman (Oregon), a newspaper in Salem, Oregon, merged into the Statesman Journal
- The Statesman (Pittsburgh), a 19th-century newspaper in Pittsburgh, Pennsylvania
- The Statesman (Stony Brook), the student newspaper of Stony Brook University, New York
- The Colorado Statesman, a now defunct weekly newspaper published in Denver, Colorado
- Idaho Statesman, a newspaper in Boise, Idaho
- Michigan Statesman, an early name of the Kalamazoo Gazette, Kalamazoo, Michigan
- Mountain Statesman, Grafton, West Virginia
- The Statesman (Georgia), newspaper published in Georgia from 1932 to 1956

=== Elsewhere ===
- The Canadian Statesman, newspaper published in Bowmanville, Ontario, Canada from 1894 to 2008
- The Statesman Newspaper, the oldest mainstream newspaper in Ghana
- The Statesman (India), an Indian English newspaper
- Dainik Statesman, an Indian Bengali newspaper
- The Statesman (Pakistan), a Pakistani newspaper

== Arts and entertainment ==
- Statesman (novel), a 1986 novel by Piers Anthony
- Statesman (Marvel Cinematic Universe), a spaceship in the Marvel Cinematic Universe
- The Statesmen, aka The Statesmen Quartet, a gospel music group
- Statesman, the American counterpart to the Kingsman organization in the film Kingsman: The Golden Circle

== Automobiles ==
- Statesman (automobile), produced by Australian General Motors subsidiary Holden from 1971 to 1985
- Nash Statesman, produced by Nash, Nash-Kelvinator Corporation, and American Motors

== Other uses ==
- HMS Statesman, a British Royal Navy submarine
- Statesman (dialogue), a Socratic dialogue written by Plato
- Packard Bell Statesman, an economy line of notebook computers introduced in 1993
- Statesmen (conspiracy theory), a conspiracy theory in Lithuania
- The Statesman, an 1836 essay by Henry Taylor
- Statesman, a man who lives on a landed estate, in the dialect of the British Lake District

== See also ==
- Statesman-Examiner, a weekly newspaper in Colville, Washington
- Austin American-Statesman, a newspaper in Austin, Texas
- London Statesman, two merchant ships
- New Statesman (disambiguation)
