= SS London Valour =

Coordinates: 43°02′N 08°06′E

History

United Kingdom
- Name: London Valour
- Owner: London & Overseas Freighters
- Operator: London & Overseas Freighters
- Port of registry: London
- Builder: Furness Shipbuilding Co Ltd, Haverton Hill-on-Tees
- Cost: £1,879,000
- Yard number: 476
- Launched: 12 June 1956
- Completed: 6 December 1956
- Identification: UK official number 187505; call sign MXGC; IMO number: 5211393
- Fate: Sank off Genoa 9 April 1970

General characteristics
- Type: oil tanker (1956–66); bulk carrier (1966–70)
- Tonnage: as tanker: 16,268 GRT; 9,497 NT; 24,900 LT DWT; as bulk carrier: 15,875 GRT; 9,102 NT; 24,700 LT DWT
- Length: 180.8 m (593 ft)
- Beam: 24.49 m (80.3 ft)
- Draught: 9.82 m (32.2 ft)
- Installed power: 8,200 shp
- Propulsion: two steam turbines double reduction-geared onto a single shaft; single screw
- Speed: 14 knots (26 km/h)
- Crew: 56
- Notes: sister ships: London Tradition; London Resolution; Overseas Pioneer; Overseas Explorer

SS London Valour was a British merchant ship belonging to London & Overseas Freighters (LOF). She was built as an oil tanker in England in 1956 and converted into a bulk carrier in Italy in 1966. She was wrecked in a gale just outside the Port of Genoa in 1970, resulting in the deaths of 20 of the 58 people aboard.

== Tanker ==
Furness Shipbuilding Co Ltd of Haverton Hill-on-Tees built London Valour in 1956 as an oil tanker. She was launched on 12 June and completed on 6 December. She was LOF's first steam turbine-driven tanker. She had twin steam turbines producing a total of 8,200 shaft horsepower (6,100 kW) between them. They were double reduction-geared onto a single shaft to drive a single screw. The turbines were built by Richardsons Westgarth & Company of Hartlepool, which was part of the same group as Furness Shipbuilding.

London Valour was a typical tanker of her era, with an accommodation block and her single funnel aft and her bridge on a larger accommodation block amidships. As built, she had two goalpost masts: one forward, just aft of her bow, and the other astern of her midship accommodation block.

London Valour was the first of five 24,900 long tons deadweight (DWT) sister ships ordered from Furness. The next two, London Tradition and London Resolution, were launched and completed in 1957. The final two were built for London and Overseas Tankers: a company in which LOF held a 50% share. Overseas Pioneer was launched and completed in 1958; Overseas Explorer was launched in 1958 and completed in 1959.

For several years the five sisters traded profitably, but in the early 1960s LOF's competitors started to operate new supertankers of about 150,000 long tons deadweight (DWT): six times the size of London Valour or her sisters, and with much lower operating costs per ton. LOF continued to get cargoes on the spot market for its tanker fleet, but at a scant profit.

== Bulk carrier ==
LOF and LOT therefore had the sisters converted into bulk carriers, and awarded the work to Industria Navali Meccaniche Affini (INMA) of La Spezia, Italy. London Resolution was converted first, in October – December 1965. Work on London Harmony started on 18 December 1966 and was completed on 23 April 1967. London Tradition followed in March – July 1967, then Overseas Explorer in April – October 1967 and Overseas Pioneer in April – August 1968.

The conversion changed the appearance of the ships. London Valour and her sisters each now had four goalpost masts – two forward of the bridge and two abaft. Each goalpost mast carried four derricks for handling cargo. Another effect of the conversions was that the tonnage of each ship was reduced by a few hundred tons.

== Shipwreck ==
Genoa in Liguria, where London Valour ran aground

The USSR had chartered LOF ships since 1960, starting with oil tankers. On 2 April 1970 London Valour left the Soviet port of Novorossiysk in the Black Sea with a cargo of 23,606 tons of iron ore for Genoa in northern Italy. On 7 April she arrived off the Port of Genoa and she anchored in the roads about 1,300 metres (4,300 ft) south of the Duca di Galliera harbour mole to await a berth.

As the bulk carrier waited at anchor the chief engineer, Sam Mitchell, used the time to carry out maintenance work on the ship's auxiliary engines. His men completed this work on the morning of 9 April.

A few hours later, at about 1200 hrs, the atmospheric pressure had fallen to 748 mmHg (997 hPa). At first the wind remained low, about Force 2 or 3, blowing from the southeast. Then at about 1300 hrs the wind backed to southwest and grew stronger. London Valour's Master, Captain Donald Muir, held a meeting on the bridge but considered the ship was not in particular danger.

In particular, Muir did not tell his deck officers that as the auxiliary engines had been down for maintenance, the engine room would need to be ordered to have the main engines on standby if a need arose to move the ship. Muir then rejoined his wife in his cabin, leaving Second Officer Donald Allan MacIsaac on watch.

The wind intensified, causing London Valour to drag her anchor and driving her towards the shore. At about 1330 hrs the first officer, Robert Kitchener, saw from his cabin that the ship was getting closer to the mole. He raised a general alarm, and Second Officer MacIsaac alerted Captain Muir and the engineer on watch.

Chief Engineer Mitchell tried to start the steam turbines to enable the ship to move away from the mole. At 1350 hrs atmospheric pressure had fallen to 742 mm of mercury and the wind had risen to a Force 8 gale. At 1422 hrs the waves and wind drove London Valour aground. At 1430 hrs London Valour transmitted a Mayday radio message.

== Rescue attempts ==
Two pilots were on duty at Genoa's pilot station: Captains Giovanni Santagata and Aldo Baffo. At about 1435 hrs they saw London Valour was within 200 to 300 metres (660 to 980 ft) of the mole and notified the harbour master's office. Santagata also alerted the tugboat station, which ordered the tug Forte to sea to assist. At about 1440 hrs Santagata and Baffo joined the crew of the pilot boat Teti and put to sea. At about 1445 hrs Teti called London Valour by VHF radio but got no reply. The ship was now about 100 metres (330 ft) from the mole and her crew had donned lifejackets. At about 1455 hrs 100 kilometres per hour (62 miles per hour) winds and 6-to-7-metre (20 to 23 ft) waves drove the ship broadside onto the rocks alongside the mole.

At 1500 hrs the Harbour Master's office put Captain Santagata in charge of the rescue operation and ordered him to keep Teti's radio on channel 16, the internationally recognised distress channel. 58 people were trapped aboard London Valour: her British officers, Indian and Filipino crew, and the wives of two of the British officers. They were in two groups, one on each accommodation block, separated by waves now breaking over the deck. Teti's helmsman, Barone, positioned the pilot boat south of the ship, between her two accommodation blocks and within 50 metres (160 ft) of her and the pilot boat now made VHF contact with London Valour.

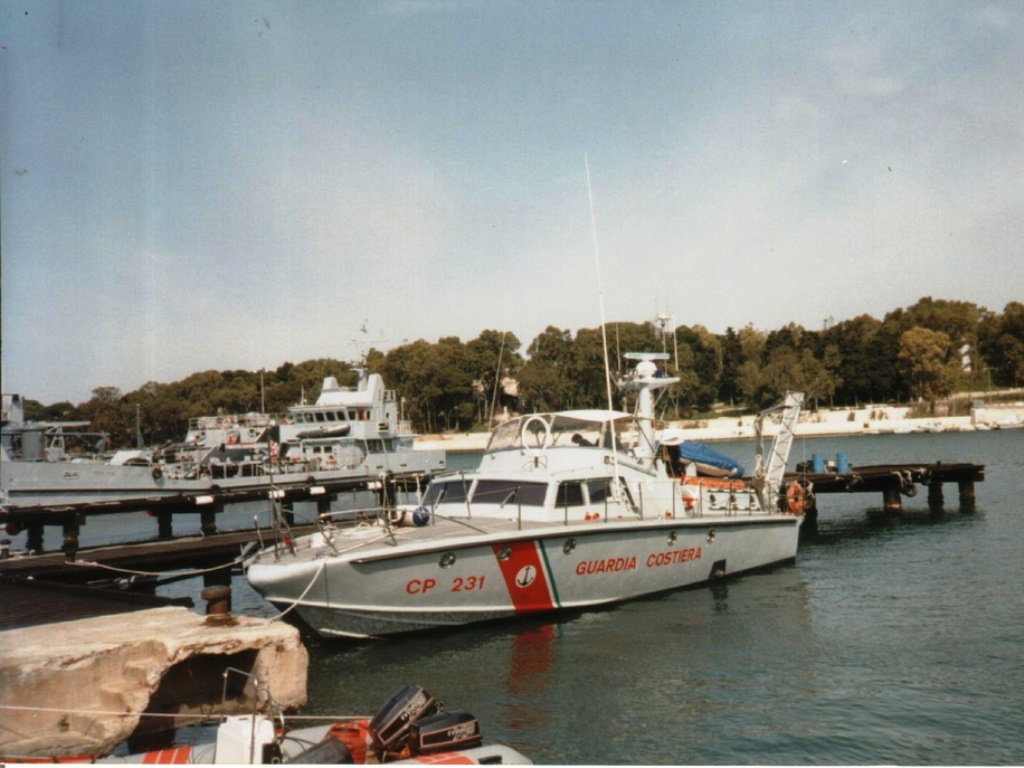
A coastguard boat of the same Super Speranza class and year (1968) as CP 233

A Guardia Costiera ("Coast Guard") boat now put to sea to join the rescue. CP 233 was a Classe Super Speranza ("Super Hope Class") coastguard boat, 14.3 metres (47 ft) long and just over 14 tonnes (15 tons), commanded by Captain Giuliano Telmon. Within the next two hours Telmon and his crew succeeded in rescuing 25 or 26 survivors.

At 1545 Captain Baffo had to pilot the cruise ship MV Canguro Verde to her berth. Teti put to sea to meet Canguro Verde, but Santagata continued to direct the rescue operation from the pilot boat.

The gale and waves continued to drive the ship on shore. London Valour's double bottom, which contained her bunker fuel, had ruptured and was leaking thick black oil into the sea.

Chief Engineer Mitchell tried to prepare one of the lifeboats for launch but he was thrown into the rough sea. The sea was covered with oil and débris and it was 90 minutes before Mitchell was rescued. Nevertheless, the only injury he sustained was to his arm as he was pulled to safety.

Second Officer MacIsaac took command of the after part of the ship. He got a covered inflatable life raft launched and ordered Third Officer Meurig Caffery and two other men into it. Teti cast a line to the raft, towed it to safety and transferred two of the men to another pilot boat. Third Officer Caffery asked Santagata to let him remain aboard Teti to help with the rescue. Caffery looked to be in good condition so Santagata agreed.

The forward and midships part of the ship was against the mole, but her stern was clear of it. The ship broke her back abaft her bridge, further separating the two groups aboard. MacIsaac remained in command of the after part, acted with courage and initiative and saved many of his shipmates, but became exhausted by his efforts and did not himself survive. As the after part was not on the rocks, the braver men were able to jump from the stern into the sea and be rescued by the craft that were standing by.

At 1615 hrs Teti returned to sea and sighted an exhausted man in the water and covered with fuel oil. Caffery dived into the sea and supported the man, and Teti's crew threw them a lifebuoy on a line. The sea was tossing Teti so violently that her crew could not haul the two men aboard, so she towed them to calmer water inside the mole. Teti's engineer, Fanciulli, tried to haul the men aboard but because of the oil they kept slipping from his grasp. The tug India came to assist. Her captain, Ragone, passed a rope around the two men, and Teti took the rope and towed the two men ashore.

At 1640 hrs Teti put to sea a third time. She found another survivor in the water, threw him a lifebelt and towed him to sheltered water behind the mole, where the tug Aleghro under Captain Fanciulli recovered him from the water and took him ashore. Teti then went back out to sea and recovered two corpses from the water.

At 1745 another pilot boat, the Preve, approached Teti and signalled her back to within the shelter of the mole. There the two boats came alongside each other and exchanged crews. Captain Tanlongo and his crew of two pilots, a helmsman and an engineer from Preve took over Teti and took her back out to sea.

At 1815 Santagata, Baffo and their crew took Preve to sea. Tanlongo radioed from Teti that he had seen three survivors on the rocks. Preve searched all along the rocks but found no-one.

The Vigili del Fuoco di Genova ("Genovese Fire Service") ashore fired a breeches buoy from the mole to the midships accommodation block. This was made fast on the ship, and the firemen hauled three Indian crewmen to safety. Captain Muir persuaded his wife Dorothy to go next, but the buoy jammed and flung Dorothy Muir from the harness to her death on the rocks below. Some sources suggest that the breaking of the ship into two coincided with the fire service's attempt to winch Dorothy Muir to safety, that this caused the breeches buoy's 220-metre (720-foot) nylon rope to flex and this was what caused it first to jam and then to fling Dorothy Muir onto the rocks. A fireman, Giuliano Macchi, tried several times to reach her but without success. Captain Muir leapt after his wife into the sea. He was later seen in the water with one leg seriously injured, and then was not seen again.

A huge wave swept the midships accommodation block, washing away the chief officer, third engineer, radio officer and his wife. The crew of a fire service helicopter threw a lifebelt to the third engineer, Arthur Carey, who managed to catch it and was rescued. The chief officer landed on the monkey island on top of London Valour's bridge, and was later rescued by the harbour master's boat. The radio officer and his wife, Eric and Nan Hill, died in the heavy sea.

All of those who survived were rescued before 1800 hrs. By that time 34 men were in hospital, four were in an hotel, eight were known to be dead and 12 were still missing. By 0930 hrs the next morning 12 bodies had been recovered and eight people remained missing.

== Inspection, salvage and disposal ==
Approximate position of the wreck of the after part of London Valour

After the disaster, divers submerged to inspect London Valour's hull. They found her anchor chain intact and paid out to a length of 175 metres (574 ft). The anchor rested on the sea floor at a depth of about 25 metres (82 ft). However, a steel cable had snagged its flukes, causing them to point upwards and preventing them from embedding themselves in the mud. This was what had prevented the anchor from holding the ship.

Salvage work started in November 1970 with the safe removal of much of the ship's cargo. As the ship's back was broken she was cut in two through her number two hold. On 11 October 1971 the Dutch company Smit Tak International Bergingsbedriff ("Smit Tak International Salvage Service") refloated the after part by filling its holds with styrofoam balls. Permission was given to sink the wreck on the Balearic Abyssal Plain east of Menorca, as it is 3.5 km (2.175 mi) below the surface of the Mediterranean and the depth would minimise risk of pollution from the wreck. Smit Tak's plan was to tow the after part to its destination and then scuttle it with dynamite.

On 12 October the tug Oceanic Vortex slowly towed the after part clear of the mole and handed it over to two Italian tugs, Torregrande and Genua. Torregrande was carrying the Dutch salvage crew and was in charge of the remainder of the operation. The hulk was low in the water, drawing 22 metres (72 ft), and showing little more than its goalpost masts above the water. For all these reasons, plus the lack of its bow, the hulk had very poor hydrodynamics. Torregrande and Genua between them developed 4,500 horsepower but managed to make only 3 knots (6 km/h) headway.

On 12 October the weather was good but on 13 October it deteriorated, with strong squalls making it harder for the tug crews to see the hulk. The hulk sank lower in the water and the tugs struggled to maintain any headway. At about 0130 hrs on 14 October Captain Negro of the Genua radioed his concerns to Captain Gatti of the Torregrande. Gatti asked the Dutch party to authorise the tugs to recover as much as possible of the towing cables and then cast the hulk loose before it sank. At about 0230 hrs Torregrande hauled in its 250-metre (820 ft) steel cable and began to recover its 220-metre (720 ft) nylon towing rope. Gatti then cut the nylon rope and cast the hulk adrift.

The hulk sank again on 14 October at 0258 hrs. The tugs had managed to tow it only about 90 miles (140 km) from Genoa. It sank, after 20 minutes, about 40 miles (64 km) south of Imperia and 50 miles (80 km) west of Cap Corse, and lies at a depth of 2,640 metres (8,660 ft). The forward part remained on the rocks at the mole in Genoa. It was broken up in situ, starting in May 1972.

== Investigations and findings ==
On 23 June 1970 Paolo Cavezzali, Italy's Under-secretary of State for the Merchant Marine made a statement to the Italian Senate. Cavezzali stated that an initial investigation found that errors by three of London Valour's officers "could not be ruled out".

1. The initial investigation suggested that Captain Muir may not have made sufficient arrangements for watchkeeping while at anchor and may not have checked whether his arrangements were effective.
2. The initial investigation suggested that Second Officer MacIsaac may have not have observed the ship's barometer and monitor the VHF radio, may have not have observed the ship's position in relation to the land and may have failed to signal the engine room in time to start the main engines.
3. The initial investigation suggested that Radio Officer Hill may not have monitored radio traffic with due diligence and may not have taken account of weather warnings of the impending storm.

Cavezzali cited the initial investigation as alleging that the officers were not always on the bridge and had not remarked on the falling atmospheric pressure. They had neither established the ship's position in relation to fixed points on the shore nor used the radar to monitor the ship's distance from the shore. More seriously, no-one aboard was monitoring the VHF radio and no-one took account of a weather report received from Malta. The initial investigation also alleged that no-one raised the alarm at 1400 hrs when the storm developed (This is contradicted by another source that states the Chief Officer raised the general alarm at 1330 hrs when he saw the ship was getting closer to the shore.) The initial investigation also alleged that the radio officer did not listen to the VHF radio at the scheduled times.

Two years later in Britain the Royal Courts of Justice considered the shipwreck under the Merchant Shipping Act 1894 (57 & 58 Vict. c. 60). The Court sat in Westminster in 1972 on 19, 20, 21, 24 and 25 April and issued its judgement on 17 May, which attributed the stranding and loss to "the wrongful act or default" of the late Captain Muir.

== Honours and monuments ==
Italy awarded the Medaglia di benemerenza marinara ("Marine Medal of Merit") to participants in the rescue. Harbour master Giuliano Telmon and fire service helicopter pilot Captain Rinaldo Enrico received gold medals. The pilots Giovanni Santagata and Aldo Baffo received silver medals. A third pilot, Giuseppe Fioretti, received a bronze medal. Two Genovese Fire Service divers (Vigili del Fuoco di Genova), Severino Ferrazzin and Luigi Neni, also received bronze metals. In 1977 Ferrazzin was made a Knight of the Italian Republic for his intervention in rescue, at sea, the steamship.

In April 1973 Britain awarded the Medal for Saving Life at Sea to two of London Valour's officers. Meurig Caffery received the bronze medal for diving from Teti and saving a man in the water. Donald MacIsaac was posthumously awarded the silver medal for his command of the after part of the ship, which "undoubtedly saved many lives" from the "ferocious seas sweeping across the vessel's decks".

LOF presented London Valour's wheel to Genoa's Ospedale San Martino ("St Martin's Hospital") in gratitude for its treatment of the injured. The company presented her Red Ensign and small bell to the harbour master of the Port of Genoa. LOF presented her main bell to the Church of England Church of the Holy Ghost in Genoa, where it is now the Sanctus bell.

== In popular culture ==
The Italian singer and songwriter Fabrizio De André wrote and sang a song Parlando del naufragio della London Valour ("Talking about the sinking of London Valour"). His studio recording of the song is included on his album Rimini released in 1978.

== Sources and further reading ==
- "Presidenza del Vice Presidente Caleffi" (PDF). 296a Seduta Pubblica, Resoconto Stenografico (in Italian). Senato della Republica: 15602–15616. 23 June 1970.
- Sedgwick, Stanley; Kinnaird, Mark; O'Donoghue, K.J. (1993) [1992]. London & Overseas Freighters, 1948–92: A Short History. World Ship Society. ISBN 0-905617-68-1.
- Sedgwick, Stanley; Sprake, RF (1977). London & Overseas Freighters Limited 1949–1977. World Ship Society. ISBN 0905617037.
