= SS Dover Hill =

UK shelter deck cargo steamship

History

United Kingdom
- Name: Maenwen (1917–18); Clan Macvicar (1918–36); Dover Hill (1936–44)
- Owner: W & CT Jones SS Co (1917–18); Clan Line (1918–36); Dover Hill SS Co (1936–43); Ministry of War Transport (1943–44)
- Operator: Counties Ship Mgt (1936–43); J & J Denholm (1943–44)
- Port of registry: Cardiff (1917–18); Glasgow (1918–44)
- Builder: Northumberland Shipbuilding Co
- Yard number: 244
- Launched: 15 December 1917
- Completed: March 1918
- Identification: UK official number 141878; Code Letters JSTP (until 1933); Call sign GQMN (1934 onward)
- Fate: Scuttled as a Corn Cob block ship

General characteristics
- Class & type: Shipping Controller standard design F1
- Type: Cargo ship
- Tonnage: 5,818 GRT, 3,621 NRT
- Length: 400.1 ft (122.0 m)
- Beam: 53.0 ft (16.2 m)
- Draught: 32.8 ft (10.0 m)
- Decks: 1
- Installed power: 569 NHP; 3,400 IHP
- Propulsion: triple expansion steam engine
- Speed: 12 knots (22 km/h)
- Sensors & processing systems: wireless direction finding
- Armament: by 1943: Bofors 40 mm gun; Oerlikon 20 mm cannon

SS Dover Hill was a United Kingdom shelter deck cargo steamship. She was launched as Maenwen but before she was completed Clan Line bought her and renamed her Clan Macvicar. She spent most of her career under this name, but is noted for her Second World War service under her later name Dover Hill.

In 1936 Counties Ship Management Ltd bought Clan Macvicar and renamed her Dover Hill. In the Second World War Dover Hill served with distinction on Arctic convoy duty. In the Normandy landings she was scuttled as a Corn Cob block ship for a Gooseberry Harbour.

== Building ==
The Northumberland Shipbuilding Company in Howdon on the River Tyne built Dover Hill to the First World War Shipping Controller's standard design F1. She was launched on 15 December 1917 and completed in March 1918.

She had nine corrugated furnaces with a combined grate area of 193 square feet (18 m^{2}) that heated three 180 lb_{f}/in^{2} single-ended boilers with a combined heating surface of 8,478 square feet (788 m^{2}). Her boilers fed a 569 NHP triple expansion steam engine built by North Eastern Marine Engineering Co. Ltd. of Newcastle.

By 1930 Dover Hill was equipped with wireless direction finding equipment.

== Peacetime career ==
Before Maenwen was completed in March 1918 Clan Line bought her for £243,000 and renamed her Clan Macvicar. In 1922 Clan Line laid her up in Colombo in Ceylon.

In December 1936 the Dover Hill Steamship Co bought Clan Macvicar for £29,000, renamed her Dover Hill and placed her under the management of Counties Ship Management Ltd. Dover Hill SS Co was a one-ship company established under CSM control to own the ship.

== Spanish Civil War ==
In 1938 during the Spanish Civil War General Franco's nationalist insurgents issued a statement alleging that more than 200 British-registered merchant ships had been used to supply the Spanish Republic with matériel banned by the international non-intervention agreement. One of the ships accused was Dover Hill, which the statement claimed had carried a cargo of 200 lorries and 400 tons of matériel from a USSR Black Sea port to Alicante, passing through the Bosphorus on 20 April.

The insurgents' statement contained inaccuracies about many of the British ships to which it referred, to the extent that some of the companies and ships that it accused did not even exist. In reality every ship serving a Republican port had to carry a Non-Intervention Officer representing the Non-Intervention Committee, and the Royal Navy detained any ship suspected of carrying matériel and inspected her cargo, in many cases by having it all unloaded for inspection at Gibraltar or Malta. It is highly unlikely that Dover Hill supplied Spain with any goods banned by the Non-Intervention Agreement.

== The Americas, Africa and Iceland ==
Dover Hill's first voyage in the Second World War was in September 1939 to Rio de Janeiro, Buenos Aires, Rosario and Montevideo. She returned in December 1939 with a cargo of wheat.

From January 1940 until February 1941 Dover Hill took part in North Atlantic convoys between North America and Great Britain. In Convoy HX 23 she brought general cargo from Canada, but in Convoys HX 75 and HX 106 she carried scrap iron from the USA. She joined HX 106 in mid-atlantic, having sailed via Bermuda and Convoy BHX 106.

Between March and May 1941 Dover Hill sailed via Gibraltar to Melilla in North Africa and returned with a cargo of iron ore.

From July to September 1941 she sailed via South Africa to Egypt. She spent seven weeks in Suez and then began her return voyage in November 1941. She made calls in Port Sudan, Aden, Dar es Salaam, Beira, Durban, Cape Town, Lobito and Freetown, and reached Liverpool in April 1942.

In September 1942 Dover Hill sailed to Iceland. She spent nearly seven weeks in Reykjavík and then returned to the Firth of Clyde in December.

== Convoy JW 53 ==
On 22 December 1942 Dover Hill left Loch Ewe in Convoy JW 51B. Five days later bad weather damaged her and forced her to turn back.

By late January 1943 Dover Hill's DEMS armament included Bofors 40 mm guns and Oerlikon 20 mm cannons. In that month she loaded a cargo of fighter aircraft, guns and munitions, plus a deck cargo of Matilda II tanks, lorries in cases and drums of lubricating oil protected by sandbags. On 23 January she sailed from her anchorage off Gourock in the Firth of Clyde and on 25 January she anchored in Loch Ewe. On 15 February she sailed for the USSR as one of 28 merchant ships in Arctic convoy JW 53. The flagship was the cruiser HMS Belfast and the convoy's other escorts included the cruisers Cumberland and Sheffield, escort carrier Dasher and 15 destroyers.

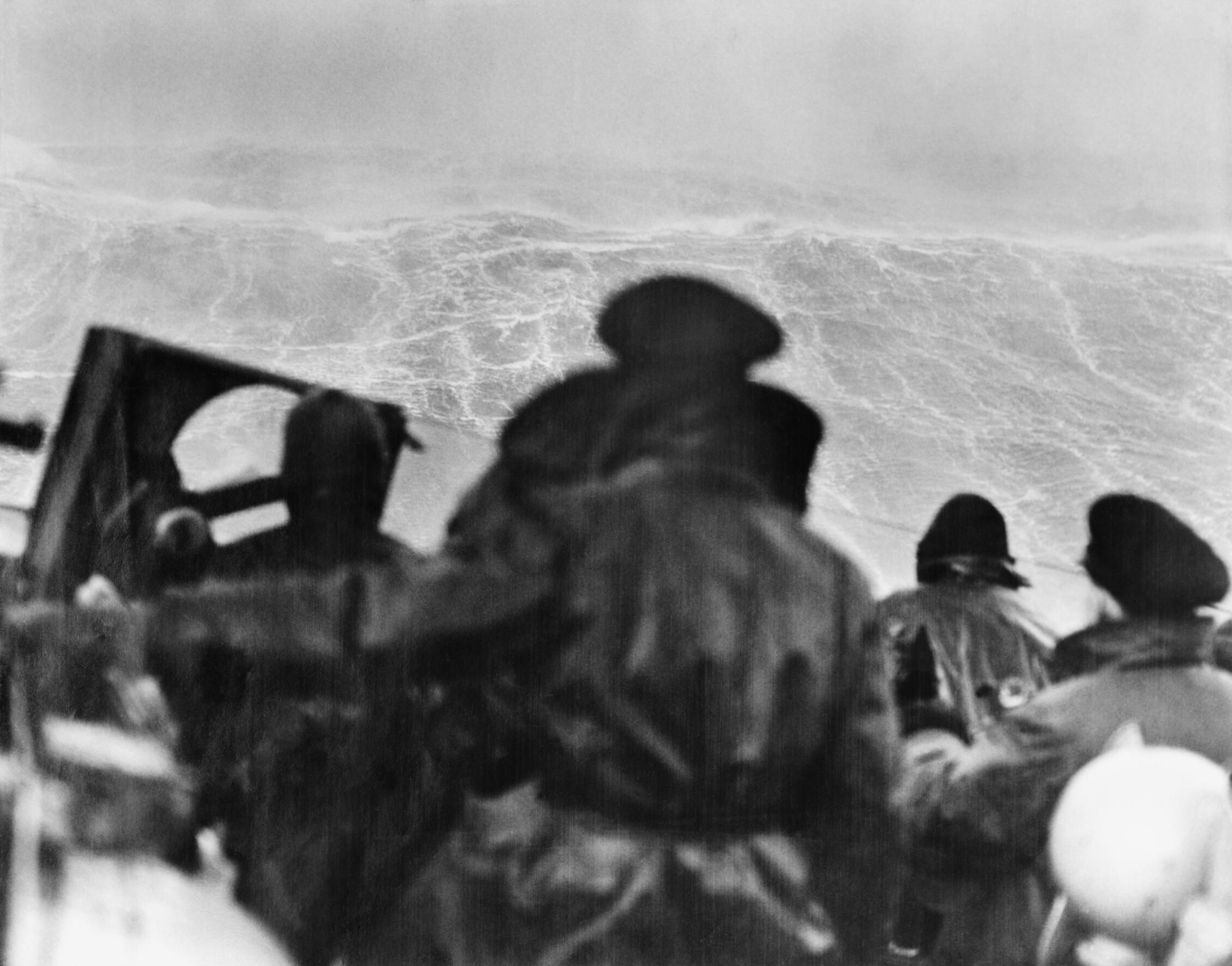
The storm that hit Convoy JW 53, pictured from the bridge of the cruiser HMS Sheffield

JW 53 has been referred to as "The Forgotten Convoy". As it sailed northward it encountered heavy winds. Six merchant ships were damaged and diverted to Iceland along with the cruiser Sheffield and the armed trawler HMT Lord Middleton. A Royal Navy flotilla led by the cruiser Scylla relieved the original escorts off Iceland. However, during the storm the aircraft carrier Dasher was damaged and returned to the Firth of Clyde, leaving JW 53 without air cover.

In the storm Dover Hill's drums of oil were lost overboard, the lorries were damaged and then they too were lost overboard. Her crew managed to save the Matilda II tanks. The poor weather scattered the ships but the weather moderated and by 20 February its Royal Navy escorts reformed the remaining 22 merchant ships into the convoy.

By now the convoy was sailing through pancake ice, which along with the naval escort ensured there were no U-boat attacks. However, on 24 February a Luftwaffe patrol aircraft shadowed the convoy and the next day Junkers Ju 88 aircraft bombed the convoy. Dover Hill was damaged and one of her gunners was wounded. The convoy reached the Kola Inlet on the northern coast of Russia on 27 February. 15 cargo ships from the convoy docked in Murmansk while seven others continued south to Archangel. Despite air attacks and adverse weather, JW 53 had lost no merchant ships en route.

== Air raids in Russia ==
Dover Hill unloaded at Murmansk. The Luftwaffe bombed the port, sinking the cargo ship Ocean Freedom at her moorings. After discharging her cargo Dover Hill moved to an anchorage in the Kola inlet. Messerschmitt Bf 109 fighters armed with bomb racks repeatedly made low-level attacks on the ships at anchor, during which Dover Hill was damaged and some of her gunners wounded. However, she shot down one Bf 109 and damaged another, which was then shot down by a ship astern of her at the anchorage.

On 4 April Dover Hill was at Misukovo Anchorage north of Murmansk when two Ju 88 bombers attacked her. Five 500 kg (1,100 lb) bombs exploded in the sea around the ship. A sixth hit her and went through her main and tween decks but failed to explode. The minesweeper HMS Jason anchored astern of Dover Hill, ready to rescue any survivors if the bomb exploded. The bomb buried itself in coal in the ship's bunkers and a team of 19 volunteers dug out the coal to find it. The Luftwaffe made further air raids, and bombs exploding in the sea around the ship repeatedly caused coal to fall back into the hole that the volunteers were digging.

The bomb was 22 feet (6.7 m) deep in the coal and it took the volunteers two days and nights to reach it. A Soviet bomb disposal specialist then defused it by unscrewing the primer and detonator. After a few turns it stuck, so the bomb disposal man tapped it with a punch and a small hammer to move it. Dover Hill's radio officer, David Craig, recalls "every time he hit it I could feel the hairs on the back of my neck standing against my duffle coat hood". The volunteers then disposed of the bomb over the side of the ship.

On 17 May Dover Hill and three other ships left the Kola Inlet and went via the White Sea to Economia on the Northern Dvina River. On 18 July Dover Hill moved again to Molotovsk. On 26 November she and eight other ships sailed for London, where they arrived on 14 December.

In October 1943, two months before Dover Hill reached London, the London Gazette had published the names of all 19 volunteers who dug out the bomb. 14 were awarded the King's Commendation for Brave Conduct. Her chief officer, third officer and second engineer were made MBEs. Her master, WG Perrin, and chief engineer, RB Baillie, were made OBEs. Perrin also awarded Lloyd's War Medal for Bravery at Sea.

== Block ship ==
Dover Hill reached London in December 1943. She was repaired and taken over by the Ministry of War Transport, who placed her under the management of J & J Denholm Ltd of Sunderland.

By April 1944 Dover Hill was in Scotland. On D-Day, 6 June 1944, she was in Poole Harbour. She crossed the English Channel and on 9 June 1944 was scuttled off Ouistreham on the Normandy coast as a Corn Cob block ship to protect the Gooseberry 5 Harbour for the Sword landing area.

== Replacement ship ==
In 1946 CSM bought Empire Nairobi, a standard Empire ship that Short Brothers in Sunderland had built in February 1945, and renamed her Dover Hill. In 1951 CSM sold her to Italian owners who registered her under the Panamanian flag of convenience as Basil. In 1954 the British Steamship Co Ltd bought her and registered her in Cardiff as Ravenshoe. She was managed by John Cory & Sons Ltd, Newport Monmouthshire. In 1960 she was sold again and registered in Piraeus as Plate Shipper. She was managed by PB Pandelis Ltd based in London. In 1961 she was sold again to Riza ve Aslan Sadikoglu Ortaklari Komandit Sirketi who renamed her Umran and registered her in Istanbul. In 1966 she was sold to Lutfi Yelkenci Evlatlari Donatma Istiraki who renamed her Tan 2. She was scrapped in Istanbul in September 1968.

== Bibliography ==
- Clarkson, John; Fenton, Roy; Munro, Archie (2007). Clan Line Illustrated Fleet History. Preston: Ships in Focus. ISBN 978-1-901703-47-4.
- Heaton, Paul M (2006). Spanish Civil War Blockade Runners. Abergavenny: PM Heaton Publishing. p. 95. ISBN 1-872006-21-3.
- Roskill, SW (1956). "XVI, Home Waters and the Arctic, 1st January – 31st May, 1943". The War at Sea 1939–45. Vol. II: The Period of Balance. London: HMSO. pp. 398–400.
- Sedgwick, Stanley; Kinnaird, Mark; O'Donoghue, KJ (1993) [1992]. London & Overseas Freighters, 1948–92: A Short History. Kendal: World Ship Society. ISBN 0-905617-68-1.
- Sedgwick, Stanley; Sprake, RF (1977). London & Overseas Freighters Limited 1949–1977. Kendal: World Ship Society. ISBN 0905617037.
