= SS Bury Hill =

British steamship

Coordinates: 14.45°N 17.33°W

History
- Name: Cardigan
- Owner: 1917–1921: Cardigan Steamship Co Ltd, Cardiff; 1921–1924: Henry W Renny, Dundee
- Operator: 1917–1921: Jenkins Brothers, Cardiff; 1921–1924: E J Leslie, Dundee
- Port of registry: (United Kingdom) Cardiff (1917–21); (United Kingdom) Dundee (1921–)
- Builder: Richardson, Duck & Co, Thornaby-on-Tees, England
- Yard number: 653
- Launched: 16 August 1917
- Completed: October 1917
- Identification: UK Official Number 139622

History
- Name: Pensylvanie
- Namesake: Commonwealth of Pennsylvania, USA
- Owner: 1924–1926: Harlem Steamship Co Ltd, London; 1926–1934: Compagnie Générale Transatlantique, Paris
- Operator: 1924–1926: Brown, Jenkinson & Co Ltd, London; 1926–1934: Compagnie Générale Transatlantique, Paris
- Port of registry: 1924–1926: (United Kingdom) Dundee; 1926–1934: (France) Le Havre
- Route: France-North America
- Launched: October 1917

History
- Name: Bury Hill
- Namesake: Bury Hill, Hampshire, England
- Owner: Sussex Steamship Co Ltd
- Operator: Counties Ship Management Ltd, London
- Port of registry: (United Kingdom) London
- Identification: UK official number 139622; Call sign GWXT; (from 1934)
- Fate: ran aground 7 December 1936

General characteristics
- Type: cargo ship
- Tonnage: 4,521 GRT; tonnage under deck 4,233; 2,767 NRT
- Length: 400.0 ft (121.9 m)
- Beam: 52.0 ft (15.8 m)
- Draught: 24 ft 3 in (7.39 m) laden
- Depth: 24.3 ft (7.4 m)
- Installed power: 425 NHP, 2,600 IHP
- Propulsion: Blair & Co 3-cylinder triple expansion steam engine; single screw
- Speed: 10 knots
- Crew: 31

SS Bury Hill was a cargo ship built in England during the First World War as Cardigan, later becoming Pensylvanie of Compagnie Générale Transatlantique (CGT). In 1934 she returned to the British register as Bury Hill but was wrecked on the coast of Senegal in 1936.

== Trading career ==
The ship was built by Richardson, Duck and Company of Thornaby-on-Tees in northeast England. She had nine corrugated furnaces with a combined grate area of 192 square feet (18 m^{2}) heating three 180 lb_{f}/in^{2} single-ended boilers with a combined heating surface of 7,171 square feet (666 m^{2}). The boilers fed a three-cylinder triple expansion steam engine that was built by Blair & Co, Stockton-on-Tees and rated at 425 NHP (2,600 IHP).

== Trading career ==
The ship was launched in 1917 as Cardigan for the Cardigan Steamship Co of Cardiff, who placed her under the management of Jenkins Brothers, also of Cardiff. In 1921 Cardigan sold her to Henry W Renny of Dundee, who placed her under the management of EJ Leslie, also of Dundee. In 1924 Renny sold her to Harlem Steamship Co Ltd, a British subsidiary of CGT (known internationally as "French Line"), who renamed her Pensylvanie and placed her under the management of Brown, Jenkinson & Co Ltd. In 1926 she was transferred to the parent company's ownership and French register. She worked on CGT's regular cargo service between France and North America until 1932, when she was laid up.

CGT sold Pensylvanie in 1934 for £8,500 to the Sussex Steamship Company Ltd, a British company managed by Counties Ship Management, under the control of Basil Mavroleon. She was reconditioned at Newport, Monmouthshire for a gross cost of £13,007, renamed Bury Hill and returned to the British flag.

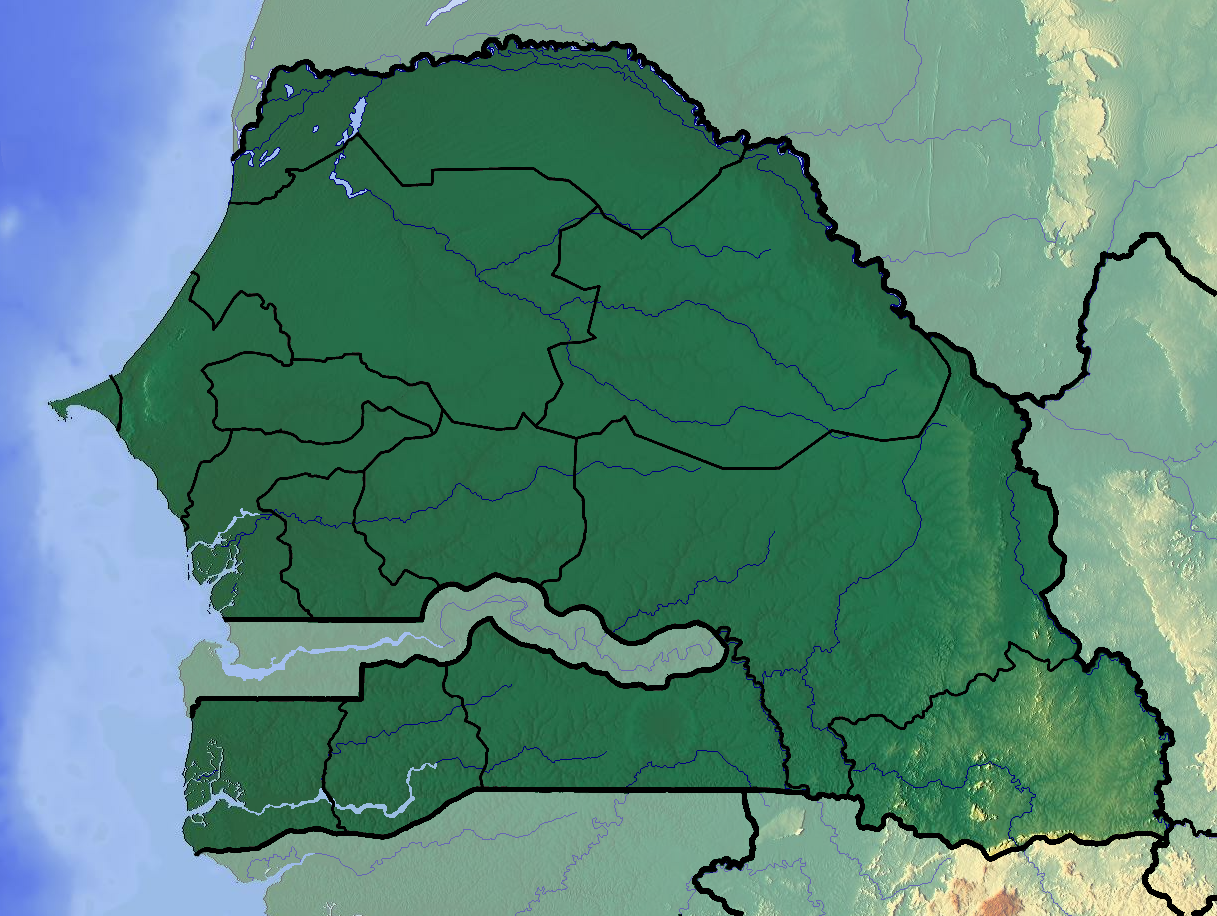
Approximate position of the sinking of Bury Hill off Senegal.

== Wreck ==
On 20 October 1936 Bury Hill sailed from Bunbury, Western Australia with a cargo of wheat. On 13 November she bunkered (refuelled) at Durban, South Africa. On 5 December she entered the port of Dakar, Senegal, and at 21.27 hrs on 7 December she sailed from Dakar without a pilot. At 23.43 hrs she stranded on the Almadi Reef, which was a known navigational hazard near Dakar port, marked by a fixed white light with a range of 10 miles. At the time of the incident the wrecks of four other ships already lay on the reef, including SS Beryl whose position was found to have contributed to the Bury Hill's grounding. Bury Hill was not refloated and became a total loss.

Allowing for 10% per annum depreciation, her book value at the time of the loss was £10,828 0s 2d. She was insured for £21,500 and her cargo was insured with both a time policy for £4,000 and a voyage policy for £5,400. At the time of her loss, her owners valued Bury Hill at £29,000.

== Board of Trade investigation ==
On 4–7 May 1937 the UK's Board of Trade held an investigation hearing into the accident and on 17 June the Court published its report. It found that Bury Hill's Master, Captain Walter V. Smith, had failed:

...to navigate his vessel with that degree of care which is to be expected from a prudent seaman in that he did not give the coast, of which he had no previous knowledge and for the navigation of which his aids were insufficient, a safe and proper offing; did not take proper steps to provide himself with sufficient aids to navigation for the voyage upon which he was engaged; failed to make proper use of such aids to navigation as he had on board his vessel; and assumed too readily that the Almadi light, of whose existence he was wholly unaware, was the light of another vessel.

Bury Hill had no chart of the approaches to Dakar, so when in Durban, Captain Smith had tried without success to obtain one. He was therefore limited to large-scale charts of the area and was completely unaware of the Almadi light. The third officer, Mr. Walter, was on watch at the time of the grounding, and both Walter and Smith sighted the light. However, the wreck of Beryl lay on the reef behind the light in their line of sight. Smith and Walter saw Beryl, failed to realise she was a wreck and mistook the Almadi light to be one of her navigation lights. They accordingly set the wrong course and struck the reef.

The Court considered suspending Smith's Master's Certificate. However, the Court made allowance for what it called Smith's "sheer ill fortune" that the necessary chart was out of stock when he sought to buy a copy in Durban. The Court also made allowance for the conjunction of the Almadi light and Beryl's wreck in Smith and Walter's line of sight contributing to their error. The Court therefore allowed Smith to retain his certificate but charged him £50 court costs.

=== Logbook alterations ===
The Court found that a number of entries in Bury Hill's "scrap log" had been erased and rewritten, and observed that inquiries into incidents on other vessels had found similar cases of alteration. The court therefore recommended:

that it should be a standing order on all British sea-going vessels that all entries in log books should be made either in ink or, if pencils are used, in indelible pencil; and that no erasure should be permitted, any alteration necessary being made by drawing a line through the original entry, the alteration being initialled by the officer making it.
