= The New Statesman (1984 TV series) =

1984–1985 British TV series

- Genre: Sitcom
- Written by: Douglas Watkinson
- Directed by: David Askey
- Starring: Windsor Davies; Anna Dawson; Sean Chapman
- Country of origin: United Kingdom
- Original language: English
- No. of series: 1
- No. of episodes: 6 + 1 pilot

Production
- Producer: David Askey
- Running time: 30 minutes
- Production company: BBC

Original release
- Network: BBC 2
- Release: 3 December 1984 – 17 October 1985

The New Statesman is a British television sitcom which first aired on BBC 2. It consists of seven episodes, including the original pilot. It is unrelated to the ITV series of the same name which began three years later.

The life of the pompous, grandiose curator of a small agricultural museum near Aylesbury is turned upside down when he inherits a Welsh Earldom. However, his inheritance turns out to be far less grandiose than he expects.

== Main cast ==
- Windsor Davies as George Vance
- Anna Dawson as Enid Vance
- Sean Chapman as Robert Vance
- Madeline Adams as Clementine Vance
- Ivor Roberts as Phillip Thomas
- Eilian Wyn as Owen Thomas
- Victoria Plucknett as Leonora Thomas
- Julian Curry as Lecturer
- Paul Beech as Butler
- Derek Benfield as Mr. Walmsley

== Bibliography ==
- Perry, Christopher (2015), The British Television Pilot Episodes Research Guide 1936–2015
