= German submarine U-122 (1939) =

Missing German World War II submarine

History

Nazi Germany
- Name: U-122
- Ordered: 15 December 1937
- Builder: DeSchiMAG AG Weser, Bremen
- Yard number: 954
- Laid down: 5 March 1939
- Launched: 20 December 1939
- Commissioned: 30 March 1940
- Fate: Missing since 22 June 1940

General characteristics
- Class & type: Type IXB submarine
- Displacement: 1,051 t (1,034 long tons) surfaced; 1,178 t (1,159 long tons) submerged
- Length: 76.50 m (251 ft) o/a; 58.75 m (192 ft 9 in) pressure hull
- Beam: 6.76 m (22 ft 2 in) o/a; 4.40 m (14 ft 5 in) pressure hull
- Draught: 4.70 m (15 ft 5 in)
- Installed power: 4,400 PS (3,200 kW; 4,300 bhp) (diesels); 1,000 PS (740 kW; 990 shp) (electric)
- Propulsion: 2 shafts; 2 × diesel engines; 2 × electric motors double-acting electric motors, 1,000 PS (990 shp; 740 kW)
- Speed: 18.2 knots (33.7 km/h; 20.9 mph) surfaced; 7.3 knots (13.5 km/h; 8.4 mph) submerged
- Range: 12,000 nmi (22,000 km; 14,000 mi) at 10 knots (19 km/h; 12 mph) surfaced; 64 nmi (119 km; 74 mi) at 4 knots (7.4 km/h; 4.6 mph) submerged
- Test depth: 230 m (750 ft)
- Complement: 48 to 56 officers and ratings
- Armament: 6 × torpedo tubes (4 bow, 2 stern); 22 × 53.3 cm (21 in) torpedoes; 1 × 10.5 cm (4.1 in) SK C/32 deck gun (180 rounds); 1 × 3.7 cm (1.5 in) SK C/30 AA gun; 1 × 2 cm FlaK 30 AA guns

Service record
- Part of: 2nd U-boat Flotilla; 30 March – 22 June 1940
- Identification codes: M 12 650
- Commanders: K.Kapt. Hans-Günther Looff; 30 March – 22 June 1940
- Operations: 2 patrols: 1st patrol: a. 16 – 19 May 1940; b. 21 – 24 May 1940; c. 24 – 25 May 1940; 2nd patrol: 13 – 22 June 1940
- Victories: 1 merchant ship sunk (5,911 GRT)

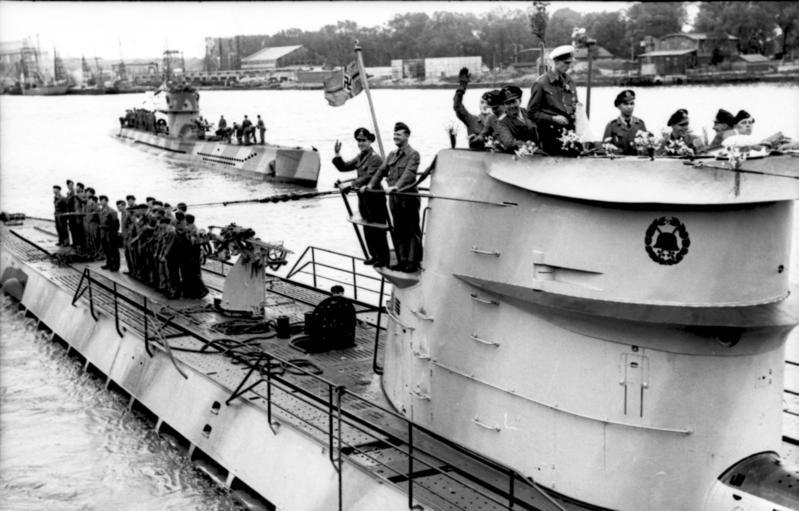

German submarine U-122 was a Type IXB U-boat of Nazi Germany's Kriegsmarine that operated during World War II.

She was ordered on 15 December 1937 and was laid down on 5 March 1939 at DeSchiMAG AG Weser, Bremen, becoming yard number 954. She was launched on 20 December 1939 and commissioned under her first and only commander, Korvettenkapitän Hans-Günther Looff on 30 March 1940.

== Design ==
Type IXB submarines were slightly larger than the original Type IX submarines, later designated IXA. U-122 had a displacement of 1,051 tonnes (1,034 long tons) when at the surface and 1,178 tonnes (1,159 long tons) while submerged. The U-boat had a total length of 76.50 m (251 ft), a pressure hull length of 58.75 m (192 ft 9 in), a beam of 6.76 m (22 ft 2 in), a height of 9.60 m (31 ft 6 in), and a draught of 4.70 m (15 ft 5 in). The submarine was powered by two MAN M 9 V 40/46 supercharged four-stroke, nine-cylinder diesel engines producing a total of 4,400 metric horsepower (3,240 kW; 4,340 shp) for use while surfaced, two Siemens-Schuckert 2 GU 345/34 double-acting electric motors producing a total of 1,000 metric horsepower (740 kW; 990 shp) for use while submerged. She had two shafts and two 1.92 m (6 ft) propellers. The boat was capable of operating at depths of up to 230 metres (750 ft).

The submarine had a maximum surface speed of 18.2 knots (33.7 km/h; 20.9 mph) and a maximum submerged speed of 7.3 knots (13.5 km/h; 8.4 mph). When submerged, the boat could operate for 64 nautical miles (119 km; 74 mi) at 4 knots (7.4 km/h; 4.6 mph); when surfaced, she could travel 12,000 nautical miles (22,000 km; 14,000 mi) at 10 knots (19 km/h; 12 mph). U-122 was fitted with six 53.3 cm (21 in) torpedo tubes (four fitted at the bow and two at the stern), 22 torpedoes, one 10.5 cm (4.13 in) SK C/32 naval gun, 180 rounds, and a 3.7 cm (1.5 in) SK C/30 as well as a 2 cm (0.79 in) C/30 anti-aircraft gun. The boat had a complement of forty-eight.

== Service history ==
She carried out two combat patrols with the 2nd U-boat Flotilla. On her first foray in May 1940, she transported an 88 mm Flak (anti-aircraft gun) with ammunition, some bombs, 90 cbm (some 750 barrels (119 m^{3})) of fuel for aircraft and some motor oil to Trondheim during the Norwegian campaign. On 23 May she encountered an enemy submarine in the North Atlantic, but neither boat attacked each other. She sank a single ship during her career, the SS Empire Conveyor (5911 GRT) on 20 June 1940.

She was declared missing with all hands after 22 June 1940 between the North Sea and the Bay of Biscay. She may have collided with the vessel San Felipe on 22 June, or been sunk by depth charges from the corvette HMS Arabis on 23 June.

Some Dutch and Polish authors suggest that U-122 was sunk after being rammed by the submarine ORP Wilk on 20 June soon after midnight. The first officer of Wilk reported in his memoirs ramming a surfaced U-boat while it was attempting to dive. This version was often disputed and an alternative theory states that Wilk instead rammed and sank the Dutch submarine O-13, or most probably, a minefield protector buoy rather than a submarine. Moreover, the U-122 sank the SS Empire Conveyor during the day following the Wilk's collision, and she was too far away then, and reported her position for the last time on 21 June.

== Summary of raiding history ==
Date	Name	Nationality	Tonnage (GRT)	Fate
20 June 1940	Empire Conveyor	United Kingdom	5,911	Sunk

== Bibliography ==
- Busch, Rainer; Röll, Hans-Joachim (1999). German U-boat commanders of World War II : a biographical dictionary. Translated by Brooks, Geoffrey. London, Annapolis, Md: Greenhill Books, Naval Institute Press. ISBN 1-55750-186-6.
- Busch, Rainer; Röll, Hans-Joachim (1999). Deutsche U-Boot-Verluste von September 1939 bis Mai 1945 [German U-boat losses from September 1939 to May 1945]. Der U-Boot-Krieg (in German). Vol. IV. Hamburg, Berlin, Bonn: Mittler. ISBN 3-8132-0514-2.
- Gröner, Erich; Jung, Dieter; Maass, Martin (1991). German Warships 1815–1945, U-boats and Mine Warfare Vessels. Vol. 2. Translated by Thomas, Keith; Magowan, Rachel. London: Conway Maritime Press. ISBN 0-85177-593-4.
- Kemp, Paul (1999). U-Boats Destroyed – German Submarine Losses in the World Wars. London: Arms & Armour. ISBN 1-85409-515-3.
