= SS Empire Conveyor =

Cargo ship owned by various countries in service 1917-1940

History
- Name: Farnworth (1917–24); Illinois (1926–34); Mount Pentelikon (1934–39); Gloria (1939); Empire Conveyor (1939–40)
- Owner: R S Dalgleish Ltd (1917–24); Harlem Steamship Co Ltd (1924–26); CGT (1926–34); Kulukundis Shipping Co SA (1934–39); Orion Schiffahrts GmbH (1939); Ministry of War Transport (1939–40)
- Operator: R S Dalgleish Ltd (1917–24); F Newson (1924); Brown, Jenkinson & Co Ltd (1924–26); CGT (1926–32); Rethymis & Kulukundis Ltd (1934–39); E Behnke (1939); H Hogarth & Sons Ltd (1939–40)
- Port of registry: (United Kingdom of Great Britain and Ireland) Newcastle upon Tyne (1917–23); (United Kingdom) Newcastle upon Tyne (1923–26); (France) Le Havre (1926–34); (Greece) Piraeus (1934–39); (Nazi Germany) Rostock (1939); (United Kingdom) London (1939–40)
- Builder: Richardson, Duck & Co
- Yard number: 651
- Launched: 20 March 1917
- Completed: June 1917
- Out of service: 20 June 1940
- Identification: code letters OTRW (1926–34); Call sign SVAV (1934–39); call sign DHBB (1939); call sign GLTN (1939–40); UK official number 140672 (1917–26, 1939–40)
- Fate: Torpedoed and sunk

General characteristics
- Type: Cargo ship
- Tonnage: 5,911 GRT; tonnage under deck 4,589; 3,682 NRT
- Length: 400.3 ft (122.0 m)
- Beam: 51.6 ft (15.7 m)
- Draught: 26 feet (7.9 m)
- Depth: 32.9 ft (10.0 m)
- Installed power: 440 NHP
- Propulsion: 3-cylinder Triple expansion steam engine; screw
- Speed: 10 knots (19 km/h)
- Crew: 41 (Empire Conveyor)
- Notes: Laid up 1932–34

Location of the sinking of Empire Conveyor off Scotland.

Empire Conveyor was a 5,911 GRT shelter deck cargo ship that was built in 1917 as Farnworth by Richardson, Duck and Company, Thornaby-on-Tees, England. After a sale in 1924 she was renamed Illinois. In 1926, she was sold to France, and in 1934 to Greece and was renamed Mount Pentelikon. In 1939, she was sold to Germany and was renamed Gloria.

At the outbreak of the Second World War she was in Buenos Aires, Argentina. She tried to return to Germany but was captured by the Royal Navy, passed to the Ministry of War Transport (MoWT) and renamed Empire Conveyor. She served until 20 June 1940 when she was torpedoed and sunk by U-122 off Barra Head.

== Description ==
The ship was 400 feet 3 inches (122.00 m) long, with a beam of 51 feet 6 inches (15.70 m). She had a depth of 32 feet 9 inches (9.98 m) and a draught of 25 feet 11 1/2 inches (7.912 m). She was assessed at 5,711 GRT, 3,589 NRT.

The ship had nine corrugated furnaces with a combined grate area of 192 feet (59 m) heating her three single-ended 180 lb_{f}/in^{2} boilers, which had a combined heating surface of 7,171 square feet (666 m^{2}). The boilers fed a 440 NHP triple expansion steam engine that was built by Blair & Co Ltd of Stockton-on-Tees. It had cylinders of 27 inches (69 cm), 44 1/2 inches (113 cm) and 74 inches (190 cm) diameter, by 48 inches (120 cm) stroke and could propel the ship at 10 knots (19 km/h).

== History ==
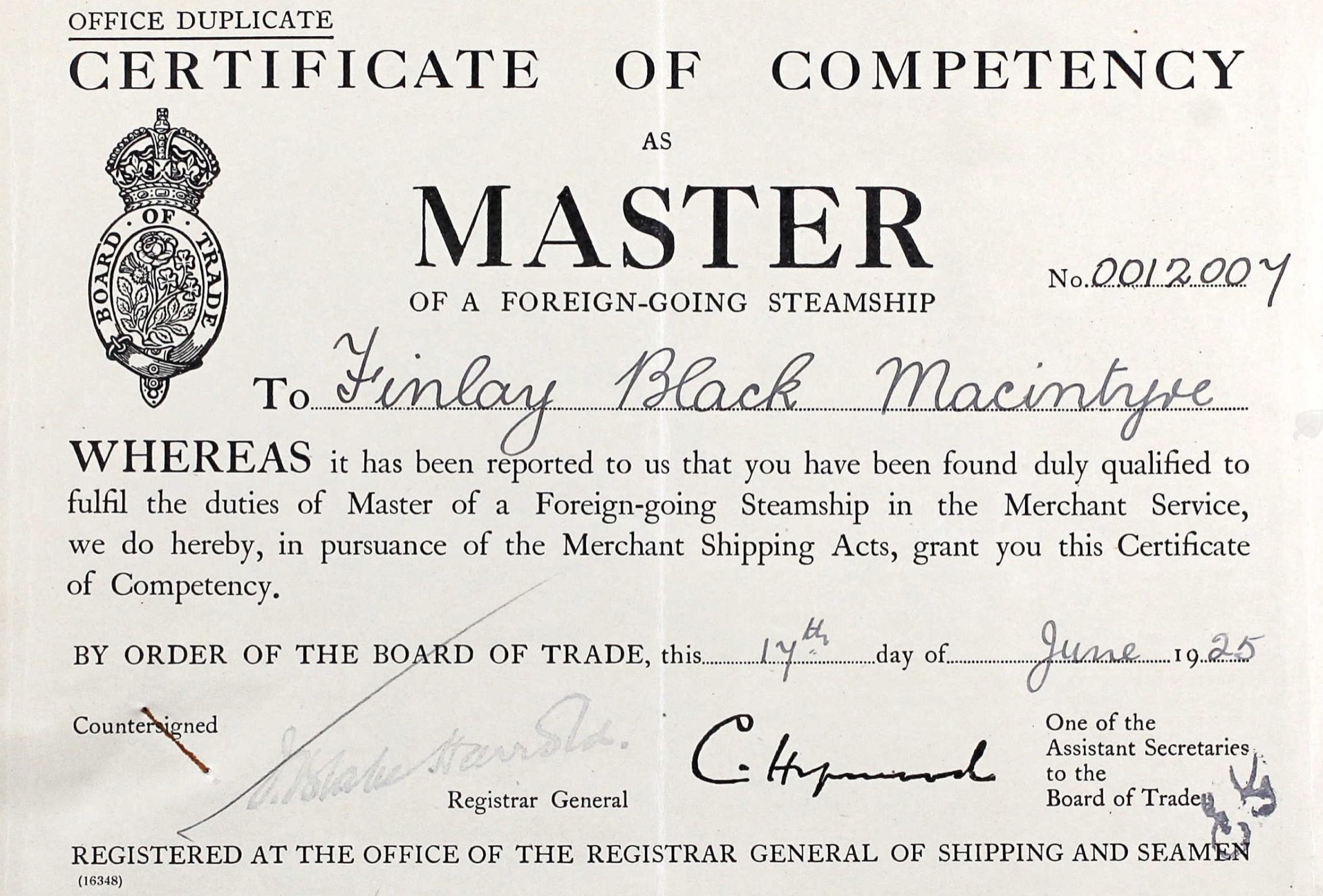
Certificate of Competency for Finlay Black Macintyre

Richardson, Duck and Company of Thornaby-on-Tees built Farnworth was built for R.S. Dalgleish Ltd, Newcastle upon Tyne and completed her in June 1917. She was allocated the United Kingdom Official Number 140672. Farnworth was used on routes serving the east and west coast of the United States, the Caribbean and West Indies. In 1924, she was sold to the Harlem Steamship Co Ltd, Newcastle upon Tyne and was renamed Illinois. She was initially operated under the management of F Newson. Later in 1924, management was transferred to Brown, Jenkinson & Co Ltd. In 1926 she was transferred to Compagnie Générale Transatlantique. Her port of registry was Le Havre and the Code Letters OTRW were allocated. On 17 March 1932, Illinois was laid up at Roscanvel. In 1934, Illinois was sold to Kulukundis Shipping Co, Piraeus, Greece and renamed Mount Pentelikon. She was placed under the management of Rethymnis & Kulukundis Ltd. Her port of registry was changed to Piraeus and the Code Letters SVAV were allocated.

In 1939, Mount Pentelikon was sold to Orion Schiffahrts GmbH, Rostock, Germany. She was operated under the management of E Behnke. The Code Letters DHBB were allocated. At the outbreak of the Second World War Gloria was at Buenos Aires, Argentina. She departed Buenos Aires on 6 October, bound for Hamburg. On 21 October she was captured south-east of Iceland (65°30′N 22°05′W) by HMS Sheffield, escorted into Kirkwall and then taken to Leith. During the voyage into Kirkwall, three of her crew attempted to escape by lifeboat but were recaptured and taken to Methil, Scotland.

Gloria was passed to the MoWT and renamed Empire Conveyor. Her port of registry was changed to London, and the Code Letters GLTN were allocated. Empire Conveyor regained her Official Number 140572. She was placed under the management of H Hogarth & Sons Ltd. On 20 June 1940, Empire Conveyor was torpedoed by U-122 50 nautical miles (93 km) south west of Barra Head, Scotland at 56°16′N 8°10′W. Her radio aerials were damaged in the attack and Empire Conveyor was unable to call for assistance. She was spotted by a Royal Air Force Sunderland aircraft, which attacked U-122 and drove her away. The crew of the Sunderland raised the alarm, and the tug HMS Amsterdam was sent to her aid, escorted by HMS Atherstone and HMS Campbell. Empire Conveyor sank before the ships reached her. The crew took to the lifeboats and liferafts but one of them was swamped at launch, killing the captain, Finlay Macintyre, the second engineer and the cook. Thirty-eight survivors were rescued by HMS Campbell and landed at Liverpool on 21 June. Empire Conveyor was the only ship sunk by U-122. Those lost on Empire Conveyor are commemorated at the Tower Hill Memorial, London.
