= MV Putney Hill =

British cargo ship

Coordinates: 24.20°N 63.16°W

History

United Kingdom
- Name: MV Putney Hill
- Owner: Putney Hill Steamships Co Ltd
- Operator: Counties Ship Management Co Ltd, London
- Builder: William Doxford & Sons, Sunderland
- Launched: 23 April 1940
- Completed: 1940
- Out of service: 26 June 1942
- Identification: UK official number 167587; Call sign GLSS
- Fate: Sunk by torpedo & shellfire

General characteristics
- Type: Cargo ship
- Tonnage: 5,216 GRT; tonnage under deck 4,685; 3,066 NRT
- Length: 427.6 ft (130.3 m) p/p
- Beam: 56.5 ft (17.2 m)
- Draught: 26 ft 10 3/4 in (8.20 m)
- Depth: 26.5 ft (8.1 m)
- Installed power: 516 NHP
- Propulsion: 3-cylinder single-acting two-stroke diesel engine driving a single screw
- Crew: 38
- Armament: 4 in (100 mm) gun
- Notes: sister ship: Tower Grange

MV Putney Hill was a cargo ship completed by William Doxford & Sons Ltd in Sunderland in 1940. She was owned by Putney Hill Steamships Co Ltd and managed by Counties Ship Management Co Ltd of London (CSM), both of which were offshoots of the Rethymnis & Kulukundis shipbroking company. Putney Hill was a sister ship of MV Tower Grange, which Doxford built in the same year for another CSM company, Tower Steamships Co Ltd.

== Sinking ==
Putney Hill was sailing in ballast and unescorted in the Atlantic about 450 miles east of Puerto Rico when at 0544 hrs on 26 June 1942 the German submarine U-203 hit her with one torpedo in the port side, breaching her no. 3 hold and port ballast tank. The loss of hundreds of tons of water from the port ballast tank caused Putney Hill at first to roll to starboard, until the water from her starboard ballast tank flowed through to port, equalised her and balanced the ship again. As she shipped more water, Putney Hill's bow settled lower in the sea.

Putney Hill's two port lifeboats were destroyed by the blast so her crew abandoned ship with her two starboard boats and a liferaft. DEMS gunner Jeffrey Banks and Second Cook James Campbell were lost. The sinking of Putney Hill's bow temporarily raised her stern in the water, exposing her propeller, and Campbell was last seen clinging to it. Banks and an apprentice called Hancock were in the water and clung to a floating oar, but it could not support them both and Banks was lost. U-203 then surfaced and fired 53 rounds from her deck gun, sinking Putney Hill.

U-203 cruised close to the survivors, trying to find the Master or another officer in order to interrogate them and try to find out any British codes or orders. Hancock, who could not swim, grabbed the submarine's ballast intakes and Kriegsmarine sailors hauled him aboard. The commander, Kapitänleutnant Rolf Mützelburg, interrogated Hancock but the apprentice knew nothing useful, so Mützelburg released Hancock to his shipmates on the liferaft. Mützelburg told survivors they were about 485 miles northwest of San Juan, Puerto Rico.

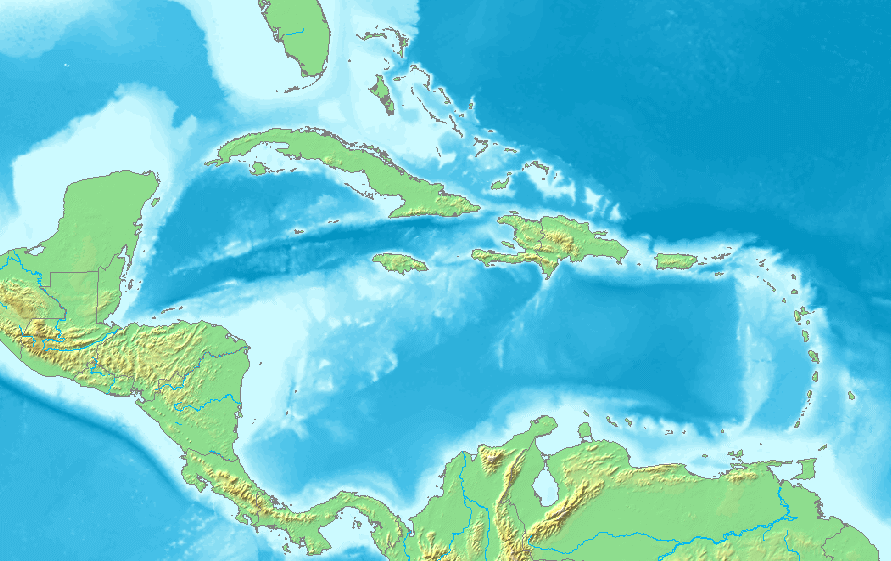
Approximate position of Putney Hill's wreck

At dawn the lifeboats sighted the raft and the larger boat took aboard the nine survivors from the raft. The smaller boat had suffered damage to her rudder gear, so the larger one took her in tow. They set sail and tried to make for the West Indies. When Putney Hill was hit a pipeline burst in the engine room, spraying the Fourth Engineer, Kenneth Cowling, with hot oil that caused him extensive burns. After seven days in one of the lifeboats Cowling died and his shipmates gave him a makeshift burial at sea. On the tenth day the Royal Navy Flower-class corvette HMS Saxifrage sighted the boats and rescued the survivors: the Master, 29 crew and five DEMS gunners. Saxifrage landed them at San Juan, whence they were repatriated via Norfolk, Virginia and New York.

== Replacement ship ==
In 1948 Putney Hill Steamships bought the Empire ship Empire Celia and renamed her Putney Hill. In 1949 her name was changed again to Castle Hill. In 1950 she became London Statesman under a new Rethymnis & Kulukundis company, London & Overseas Freighters Ltd (LOF). In 1951 LOF sold her to new owners who registered her under the Panamanian flag of convenience as Morella but then before the end of the year sold her on to Polskie Linie Oceaniczne (Polish Ocean Lines), who renamed her Jedność ("Unity"). She was scrapped in Hong Kong in 1966.
