= New Statesman (disambiguation) =

The New Statesman is a British political and cultural magazine.

New Statesman or New Statesmen may also refer to:

- The New Statesman (1984 TV series), a British television sitcom starring Windsor Davies
- The New Statesman (1987 TV series), a 1987–1994 British television series starring Rik Mayall
- New Statesmen, a comic strip written by John Smith and published in Crisis

== See also ==
- Statesman (disambiguation)
