= MV London Statesman =

Dry cargo ship

History

United Kingdom
- Name: MV London Statesman (1963–79)
- Port of registry: (United Kingdom) London (1963–79)
- Builder: Uddevallavarvet AB, Uddevalla
- Cost: £1,310,000
- Yard number: 191
- Launched: 30 January 1963
- Renamed: Agia Marina (1979–81); Olympiakos (1981–83); Skaros (1983–84)
- Identification: UK official number 304576
- Fate: Damaged by Exocet missile in 1984 and scrapped

General characteristics
- Tonnage: 10,892 GRT; 6,196 net; 15,100 DWT
- Installed power: 10,000 bhp
- Propulsion: 8-cylinder Götaverken single-acting; two-stroke diesel engine.
- Speed: 16.5 knots (30.6 km/h)
- Notes: sister ships: London Craftsman; London Tradesman

MV London Statesman was a dry cargo ship built by Uddevallavarvet AB, Uddevalla in Sweden for London & Overseas Freighters (LOF). She was launched on 30 January 1963, completed on 26 June of that year and cost just over £1.3 million. LOF employed her on the tramp trade.

On 10 July 1972 during the Vietnam War the London Statesman was unloading a cargo of rice in Nha Trang in South Vietnam when her engine room flooded and she sank by the stern. Sabotage by the Viet Cong was suspected. On 31 July she was refloated and towed to Singapore for repairs. She continued to trade with LOF until 1979.

On 5 January 1979 LOF sold her to Diana Shipping Agencies who renamed her Agia Marina. In 1981 Diana Shipping sold her to new owners who renamed her Olympiakos. In 1983 she was sold again to OBI Island Maritime who renamed her Skaros.

On 1 February 1984 during the Iran–Iraq War Skaros was one of four merchant ships in a convoy outward bound in the Bandar Imam Khomeini Channel. Iraqi aircraft attacked the convoy with Exocet missiles, hitting all four ships. Skaros was hit in the engine room and set on fire. She was towed back to Bandar Imam Khomeini that same day, where her insurers declared her a total loss.

== Sources and further reading ==
- Grimord, David Leslie (30 September 1986). "Appendix I" (PDF). The Iran-Iraq War: A Juridical Analysis of the Attacks on Neutral Ships and Visit and Search Operations in the Persian Gulf (Master of Laws thesis). George Washington University. p. 98.
- Sedgwick, Stanley; Kinnaird, Mark; O'Donoghue, K.J. (1993) [1992]. London & Overseas Freighters, 1948–92: A Short History. World Ship Society. ISBN 0-905617-68-1.
- Sedgwick, Stanley; Sprake, R.F. (1977). London & Overseas Freighters Limited 1949–1977. World Ship Society. ISBN 0905617037.
