= SS Canadian Constructor =

History

Canada
- Name: SS Canadian Constructor
- Owner: Canadian Constructor, Ltd.
- Operator: Canadian National Steamships
- Port of registry: Halifax, Nova Scotia
- Builder: Halifax Shipyards Ltd, Nova Scotia
- Launched: 24 September 1921
- Completed: 1922
- Out of service: 1939
- Identification: Call sign VGLZ (from 1934); official number 150465
- Fate: Sold

United Kingdom
- Name: SS Argos Hill
- Namesake: Argos Hill, Mayfield, East Sussex
- Owner: Ernels Shipping Co, London
- Operator: Counties Ship Management Co Ltd, London
- Port of registry: (United Kingdom) London
- Acquired: 1939
- Out of service: August 1945
- Identification: Call sign GTTP; official number 150465
- Fate: Burnt out

General characteristics
- Type: refrigerated cargo ship
- Tonnage: 7,178 GRT; 6,664 tonnage under deck; 4,418 NRT
- Length: 430.0 ft (131.1 m)
- Beam: 56.2 ft (17.1 m)
- Draught: 29 ft 2 in (8.89 m)
- Depth: 34.8 ft (10.6 m)
- Installed power: 705 NHP
- Propulsion: Triple expansion steam engine; screw

SS Canadian Constructor was a 7,178 GRT refrigerated ship built in 1922 by Halifax Shipyards Ltd in Nova Scotia.

The ship had 12 corrugated furnaces with a combined grate area of 264 square feet (25 m^{2}) heating her four 180 lb_{f}/in^{2} single-ended boilers, which had a combined heating surface of 10,848 square feet (1,008 m^{2}). The boilers fed a 705 NHP triple expansion steam engine that was built by Tidewater Shipbuilders Ltd of Trois-Rivières, Quebec. Her hull had a 13-ton fore peak tank and a 128-ton aft peak tank.

The ship's first manager was Canadian National Steamships, which set up a one-ship company, Canadian Constructor Ltd, to own her.

In 1939 she was sold to Ernels Shipping Co of London, who registered her in London as SS Argos Hill and her placed under the control of Counties Ship Management. She was damaged in an air attack on Convoy OA 178 in the English Channel on 4 July 1940.

Argos Hill survived and remained in service until after the surrender of Germany, but was destroyed by fire on 7 August 1945 just a week before the surrender of Japan.

== Bibliography ==
- "Lloyd's Register of Shipping" (PDF). Lloyd's Register. 1935.
- Slader, John (1988). The Red Duster at War. London: William Kimber & Co Ltd. pp. 54–55. ISBN 0-7183-0679-1.
