= Madeline Adams =

British actress

Madeline Adams is a British actress known for stage, film, and television work in the United Kingdom.

== Career ==
Adams appeared as an additional performer in the 1986 musical film Little Shop of Horrors, directed by Frank Oz.

Her television credits include Mammoth, Bridgend, and Screen Two, as well as The New Statesman (1984) and Backup (1995).

On stage, Adams performed in a production of William Shakespeare's Hamlet at the Salisbury Playhouse in Salisbury, Wiltshire, England, in a cast that included Dominic Letts, Keith Drinkel, Maria Heidler, and Alex Johnson.

=== Television ===
Her television credits include a role as Clementine Vance in The New Statesman (1985), Cathy Arthur in the BBC anthology series Screen Two (1986), Viv Elliott in One by One (credited as "Madelaine Adams"), and Michelle's mother in Backup (1995). She also played Maureen in the series Mammoth.
