= Eilian Wyn =

Welsh actor

Eilian Wyn (also credited as Eilian Wyn-Jones or Eilian Wynn) is a Welsh stage, film, and television actor from Deiniolen, North Wales, whose career spans from the 1960s to the present.

== Career ==
=== Welsh-language theatre ===
Wyn was one of three actors who gave the premiere performance of Y Ffin, a play by Gwenlyn Parry, at the National Eisteddfod in the Vale of Clwyd in 1973, alongside Gaynor Morgan Rees and David Lyn, staged by Cwmni Theatr Cymru. He played the lead role of Enoc Huws in a 1974 BBC Cymru television adaptation of Daniel Owen's novel Enoc Huws, alongside Guto Roberts and Sharon Morgan. He was later a member of Cwmni Theatr Gwynedd and of the 1970s pop group Pryderi & His Pigs.

=== Television and film ===
Wyn's English-language screen credits include an appearance in an episode of The Wednesday Play (1970) and Thriller (1975), a role in The Duchess of Duke Street (1977), and the recurring part of "Demonstrator" in Lindsay Anderson's film Britannia Hospital (1982). He played the recurring character Owen Thomas across the pilot and first series of the sitcom The New Statesman (1984–1985). He appeared as a doctor in the film Human Traffic (1999) and provided the voice of Arawn in the animated film Y Mabinogi (2003).

More recently, Wyn appeared in Despite the Falling Snow (2016) and Mayhem (2017), and had a recurring role as "Three" in the American fantasy series The Outpost (2019–2021). He has also worked in Serbian television, including the series Beleznica profesora Miskovica (2021), and appeared in Miss Scarlet and the Duke (2022).

== Personal life ==
As of 2026, Wyn is living in Belgrade, Serbia.
