= HMS Sandfly (1863) =

Paddle gunboat from New Zealand

HMS Sandfly was a two-gun paddle gunboat used by the New Zealand colonial government during the New Zealand Wars.

== Tasmanian Maid ==
Built in Stockton-on-Tees by Richardson, Duck and Company and launched on 28 February 1856 as the Tasmanian Maid, yard number 9, for F A Ducroz (Dalgety & Co) of London for service in New Zealand. She had a length of 108 feet (33 m) and a beam of 15 feet (4.6 m). In calm sea, her 36 horse power motor was reputed to enable her to sail at 10–11 knots and 8 knots in a head wind. She measured 83 gross register tons (53 tons net register).

Once in New Zealand she sailed regularly between Nelson, Motueka, Collingwood, and Wairau carrying passengers and cargo. She was subsidized by the Nelson Provincial Government by £1,000 per annum. On 29 January 1862 she was the first steamer to cross the Westport bar.

On 25 May 1862 she was wrecked on Wairau River bar. The wreck was sold, salvaged, and recommissioned. In 1863 the Government acquired her for £4,000 when she was renamed HMS Sandfly and armed with two 12 pounder Armstrong guns.

== Land wars ==
In 1863 she was principally used to blockade the Waihou River (Thames River) and at Tauranga. She captured the 20 ton Maori supply ship Eclair on 31 October 1863 and bombarded retreating Maori at Maketu. Later she was used as a dispatch runner from New Plymouth to Waitara on a daily basis.

In 1865 she surveyed Cook Strait for an undersea telegraph cable and assisted in transporting troops to Wanganui under Captain Marks. That same year charges of mutiny were laid against Captain Hannibal Marks for disobeying the orders of Francis Cadell. Cadell had ordered the ship to leave port without its captain due to him being delayed. The ship hit the bar while leaving port, and Marks reboarded the ship in a rowing boat. Marks was suspended and replaced with Captain Fox. When his crew refused to follow the new captain they were also suspended by Cadell. The ship was sold and the services of Marks dispensed with before any of the charges came to trial.

== Wreck ==
In 1865 she reverted to civilian use as a passenger steamship and regained her name Tasmanian Maid. While sailing under Captain Souter with the SS Storm Bird under Captain Doile she stuck the Kawaroa Reef, New Plymouth at 9pm on 16 January 1868. The Storm Bird rescued all those on board before she sank.

Members of the New Plymouth Underwater Club rediscovered the wreck at the southern end of Kawaroa Reef in 1976. Some artifacts from the wreck could be seen at Adam Rosser's Taranaki Dive Shop in New Plymouth. The wreck also featured in the 6th episode of the second series of the combined BBC/TVNZ television programme Coast New Zealand in 2017.
