= Richardson, Duck and Company =

Shipbuilding company in Thornaby-on-Tees, England

Richardson, Duck and Company was a shipbuilding company in Thornaby-on-Tees, England that traded between 1855 and 1925.

== History ==
The yard was founded as the South Stockton Iron Ship Building Co in 1852. Its premises were the former yard of engine builders Fossick of Stockton and its first vessel was the iron-hulled steamship Advance. In 1855 Joseph Richardson and George Nixon Duck took over the yard. They built fifty iron steamships, a paddle steamer, ten sailing ships and 29 barges in their first ten years. In 1859 they built the paddle steamer Tasmanian Maid (yard no. 9) which in 1863 was converted into the gunboat HMS Sandfly.

In 1859 Richardson, Duck took over the Rake Kimber yard at Middlesbrough. They built about 11 vessels at Middlesbrough and then sold the yard to Backhouse and Dixon in 1862. In 1870 Richardson, Duck built Burgos (yard no. 160) which in 1884 was re-engined with a triple-expansion engine made by Blair & Co of Stockton-on-Tees. In 1893 the company built the German merchant ship Athen.

In the 1900s Richardson, Duck started building steel hulls. By the end of that decade Richardson, Duck had built five hundred tramp steamers, other merchant ships and lighters. It had also become licensees for the Isherwood system of longitudinal framing.

Richardson, Duck's ships in 1911 included the cargo steamship Budapest (yard no. 616) which was later renamed Kerwood and in 1918 was commissioned into the US Navy as Kerwood. In 1912 Richardson, Duck built 12 ships and became a limited liability company.

In the First World War the yard built the Arabis-class sloop HMS Rosemary (yard no. 661) and Aubrietia-class sloop HMS Tulip (yard no. 666). It also built a further dozen tramp steamers, eight standard War "A" tramps and a standard "AO" tanker. Richardson, Duck's wartime merchant orders included Farnworth (yard no. 651), Plawsworth (yard no. 652) and Cardigan (yard no. 653) launched in 1917; Kenilworth (yard no. 662), War Vulture (yard no. 671), War Ostrich (yard no. 672) and War Anglian (yard no. 673) all launched in 1918 and Wentworth (yard no. 676) and Clearton (yard no. 677) launched in 1919.

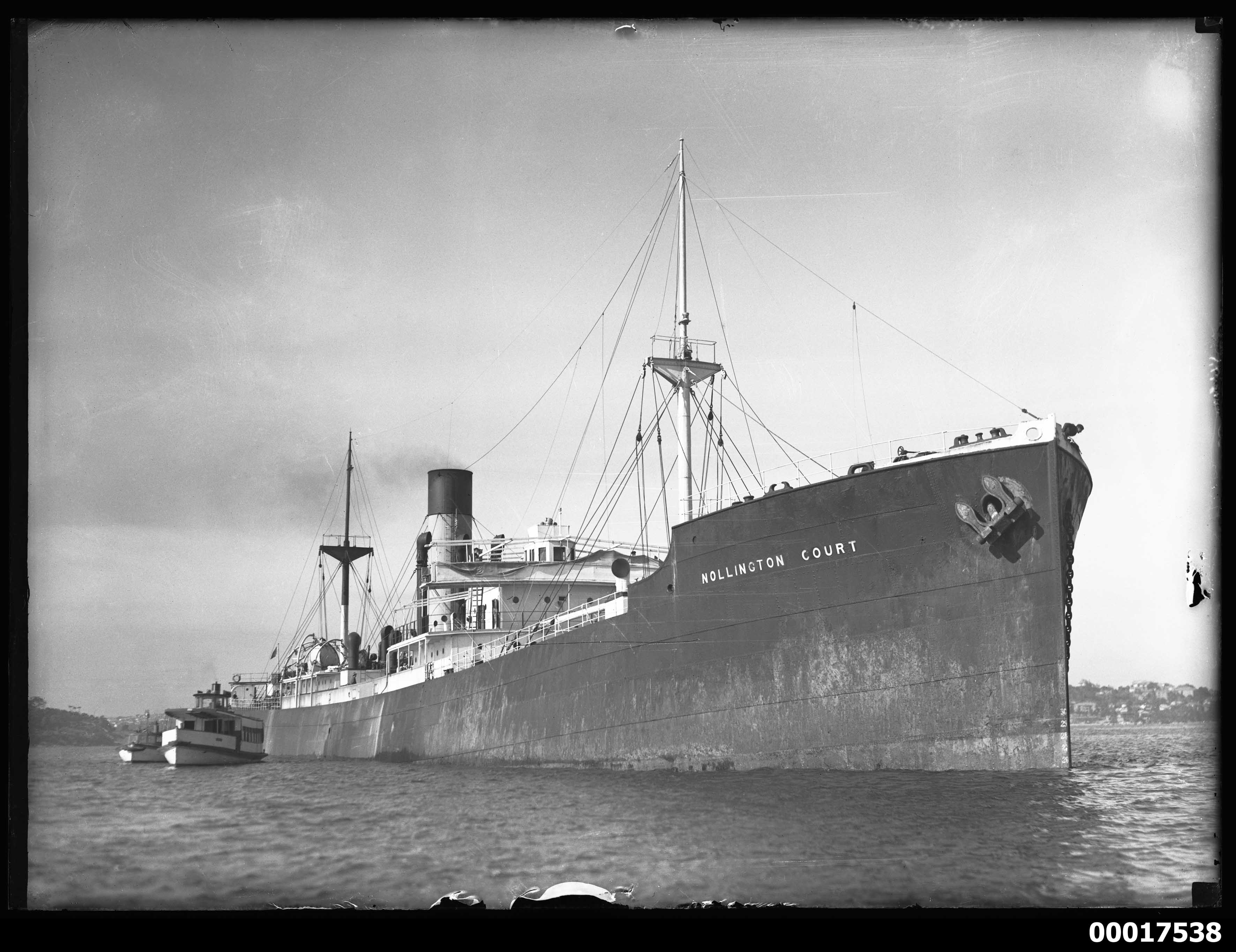
Richardson, Duck built the cargo steamship Conistone as yard no. 686 and launched her in 1924. She was renamed Nollington Court in 1927 and sank in the Caribbean in 1937.

In 1919 Richardson, Duck became a public company and in 1920 James and Walter Gould acquired a controlling interest in it. In 1922 the yard suffered industrial action and a lack of orders. Richardson, Duck's final ship was Southborough (yard no. 689) in 1924. In May 1925 the Gould Group went into liquidation and in 1933 the yard was demolished.
