= SS Empire Celia =

World War II merchant ship of the United Kingdom

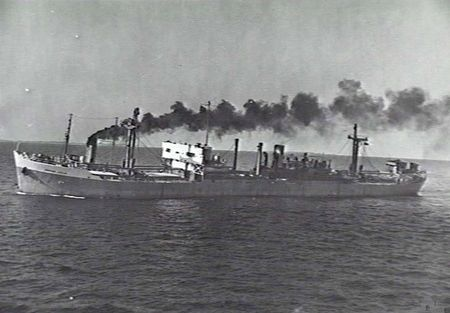
- Empire Celia, by then renamed Putney Hill, 3 December 1948

History
- Name: Empire Celia (1943–48); Putney Hill (1948–49); Castle Hill (1949–50); London Statesman (1950–51); Morella (1951); Jedność (1951–63)
- Owner: Ministry of War Transport (1942–45); Ministry of Transport (1945–48); Putney Hill Steamships (1948–50); London & Overseas Freighters Ltd (1950–51); Far Eastern & Panama Transport Corp (1951); Compagnia Istmena de Transportes Maritimos SA (1951); Polskie Linie Oceaniczne (1951–63)
- Operator: Connell & Grace Ltd (1942–46); Counties Ship Management (1946–50); London & Overseas Freighters Ltd (1950–51); Wheelock Marden & Co Ltd (1951); Compagnia Istmena de Transportes Maritimos SA (1951); Polskie Linie Oceaniczne (1951–63)
- Port of registry: (United Kingdom) Glasgow (1943–48); (United Kingdom) London (1948–51); Panama City (1951); (Poland) Gdynia (1951–63)
- Builder: Charles Connell & Co Ltd
- Yard number: 441
- Launched: April 1943; or 2 July 1943
- Out of service: 1963–66
- Identification: Code Letters BFGS (1942–51); UK Official Number 168757 (1942–51)
- Fate: Scrapped

General characteristics
- Type: Cargo ship
- Tonnage: 7,025 GRT; 6,571 tonnage under deck; 4,856 NRT; 10,821 DWT
- Length: 431.3 ft (131.5 m)
- Beam: 56.3 ft (17.2 m)
- Draught: 26 ft 9 in (8.15 m)
- Depth: 35.2 ft (10.7 m)
- Installed power: 506 NHP; 2,465 brake horsepower (1,838 kW),
- Propulsion: 3-cylinder triple-expansion steam engine; screw
- Speed: 11 knots (20 km/h)
- Armament: 1 x 4" gun (Empire Celia)

SS Empire Celia was a 7,025 GRT cargo ship built in 1943 by Charles Connell and Company Ltd of Scotstoun, Glasgow for the Ministry of War Transport (MoWT). In 1948 she was sold into merchant service and renamed Putney Hill. Further name changes were Castle Hill in 1949 and London Statesman in 1950. In 1951 she was sold to Panamanian owners and renamed Morella, being sold later that year to Polskie Linie Oceaniczne and renamed Jedność. She served until 1966, when she was scrapped.

== Description ==
The ship was built by Charles Connell & Co Ltd Glasgow as yard number 441. She was launched in either April or July 1943. She was 431.3 feet (131.5 m) long, with a beam of 56.3 feet (17.2 m). She had a depth of 35.3 feet (10.8 m) and a draught of 26 feet 9 inches (8.15 m). Her tonnages were 7,025 GRT; 6,571 tonnage under deck; 4,856 NRT and 10,821 DWT. She was fitted with direction finding equipment.

She had nine corrugated furnaces with a combined grate surface of 157 square feet (15 m^{2}) that heated three single-ended boilers with a combined heating surface of 7,170 square feet (666 m^{2}). The boilers fed a three-cylinder triple-expansion steam engine rated at 506 NHP or 2,465 brake horsepower (1,838 kW), with cylinders of 24 1/2 inches (62 cm), 39 inches (99 cm) and 70 inches (180 cm) diameter by 48 inches (120 cm) stroke. The engine was built by David Rowan & Co Ltd, Glasgow and could propel the ship at 11 knots (20 km/h).

== History ==
Empire Celia was built in 1943 for the MoWT. She was placed under the management of Connell & Grace Ltd. Her port of registry was Glasgow. She was allocated the Code Letters BFGS and United Kingdom Official Number 169757.

Empire Celia was to have been a member of Convoy HX 241, which left New York City on 24 May 1943 and arrived at Liverpool on 10 June. She was due to proceed to Milford Haven, Pembrokeshire for further orders. However, she did not sail with HX 241, but joined Convoy HX 242, which left New York on 31 May and arrived at Liverpool on 15 June. She was carrying a cargo of lumber and steel, destined for either Southampton or Swansea.

Records show that Empire Celia unloaded at Swansea and Southampton. After that she left for Malta on 19 July 1943, arriving on 4 August 1943 then departing for Casablanca then Gibraltar by 27 August 1943. There followed a voyage to Saffi, returning to Methil in Scotland by 17 September 1943 and London by 21 September 1943. She spent the remainder of the war years serving in the Arctic Convoys. She was a member of Convoy JW54A, which departed Loch Ewe on 15 November 1943 and arrived at the Kola Inlet, Soviet Union on 24 November. She returned to the United Kingdom as a member of Convoy RA 55A, which departed the Kola Inlet on 22 December and arrived at Liverpool on 1 January 1944. She was carrying a cargo of magnesite and pit props.

Empire Celia was a member of Convoy JW 57, which departed from Liverpool on 20 February 1944 and arrived at the Kola Inlet on 29 February. She was also a member of Convoy RA58, which departed the Kola Inlet on 7 April 1944 and arrived at Loch Ewe on 14 April. Empire Celia was bound for Hull.

On 2 September three Spitfire LF Mk IX aircraft were loaded aboard Empire Celia. She delivered them to the USSR on 23 September. She was also a member of Convoy RA61, which departed the Kola Inlet on 2 November and arrived at Loch Ewe on 9 November. Empire Celia carried the convoy's Vice Commodore.

Between 23 and 26 December Empire Celia embarked a cargo including thirteen Spitfire LF Mk IX's. She then sailed as a member of Convoy JW 63, which departed Loch Ewe on 30 December and arrived at the Kola Inlet on 8 January 1945. The Spitfires were delivered on 9 January. On 17 February, Empire Celia departed the Kola Inlet as a member of Convoy RA 64, which arrived at Loch Ewe on 28 February.

A photograph taken in December 1948 shows that Empire Celia was still armed with a 4-inch gun, more than three years after the end of the war.

In 1946, management of Empire Celia was transferred to Counties Ship Management. She was sold to them in 1948 and renamed Putney Hill. In 1949 she was sold to London & Overseas Freighters Ltd and renamed Castle Hill. LOF renamed her again in 1950 as London Statesman. In 1951 she was sold to Far Eastern & Panama Transport Corp, Panama and was renamed Morella. She was placed under the management of Wheelock, Marden & Co Ltd, Hong Kong. She was then sold to Compagnia Istmena de Transportes Maritimos SA.

Later in 1951, Morella was sold to Polskie Linie Oceaniczne, Gdynia, and was renamed Jedność (English: Unity). She served until 1963, when she was withdrawn from service. Jedność arrived at Hong Kong on 29 April 1963 for demolition, which was commenced by Lee Sing Co, Hong Kong on 15 May.
