= London & Overseas Freighters =

London & Overseas Freighters Ltd
- House flag
- Industry: Ship transport
- Predecessor: Counties Ship Management
- Founded: 8 April 1948
- Founder: John Kulukundis, Basil Mavroleon
- Defunct: 1997
- Fate: Taken over
- Successor: Frontline Shipping AB
- Headquarters: Balfour Place, London W1, England (1948–84) Fetter Lane, London EC4, England (1984–92) Hamilton, Bermuda (1992–97)
- Key people: "Bluey" Mavroleon, Eddie Kulukundis, Miles Kulukundis

London & Overseas Freighters Ltd. (LOF) was an ocean-going merchant shipping company that for most of its history was based in the United Kingdom.

== Counties Ship Management ==
In 1920 Manuel Kulukundis from the Aegean island of Kasos and his cousin Minas Rethymnis founded a shipbroking business in London, England. In 1934 Rethymnis & Kulukundis Ltd. (R&K) branched into shipowning, establishing a nominally separate company to own each ship. From 1934 they managed the ships under the name of Counties Ship Management Ltd (CSM). Some R&K companies grew to own more than one ship, all of which were under CSM management.

In the Second World War from 1940 onwards CSM was controlled by the Ministry of War Transport. CSM lost several ships in the war and others were damaged. In about 1946 CSM companies began replacing its losses by buying seven Liberty ships from the UK Government.

In 1948–49 ten ships from CSM companies were transferred to found a new R&K company, London & Overseas Freighters Ltd. However, in 1950 the CSM fleet was radically expanded with 34 Canadian Fort and Park ships.

In the 1950s LOF became the main R&K company and the CSM fleet was reduced in size. Its last ship was MV Port Campbell, which CSM took over in 1966 and renamed Kings Reach. CSM's history effectively ended with her sale in 1970.

== Foundation of LOF ==
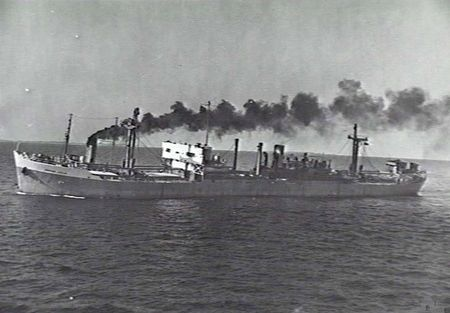
Empire Celia was Putney Hill with Counties Ship Management when this photo was taken in 1948, then became first Castle Hill, and then London Statesman with LOF in 1950

On 8 April 1948 the cousins founded a new company, London & Overseas Freighters Ltd, with the intention of owning tramp oil tankers. However, in 1949–50 LOF took over the dry cargo fleets of three R&K companies: Dorset Steamship Co Ltd, Putney Hill Steamships Co Ltd and Tower Steamship Co Ltd. In order to give the merged fleets a single "house" identity, LOF renamed all of its ships, giving each one a name beginning with "London".

Pentridge Hill, built in 1941 by Bartram & Sons for Dorset Steamships became London Dealer. The freighter Richmond Hill, built in 1940 by Bartram & Sons in Sunderland for Putney Hill Steamships became London Craftsman. The freighters Coombe Hill and Tower Hill, built by William Doxford & Sons in Sunderland for Putney Hill Steamships in 1942, became LOF's London Artisan and London Banker respectively.

A number of the CSM ships transferred to LOF were Empire ships, built to standard designs during the Second World War. Dorset Steamships' Castle Hill, previously called Lulworth Hill, became LOF's London Builder in 1950. She had been completed by the Shipbuilding Corporation Ltd. in Newcastle-upon-Tyne in 1942 as Empire Mandarin. Another Dorset Steamships' vessel, Charmouth Hill, which became LOF's London Mariner in 1950, had been completed in Hartlepool in 1943 as Empire Peak. Tower Steamships' Tower Grange, which became LOF's London Trader, had been completed by the Shipbuilding Corporation Ltd. in 1945 as Empire Morley. Another Putney Hill Steamships vessel, the Putney Hill (II) had been built in 1943 as Empire Celia. She was transferred to LOF in 1949 and at first renamed Forest Hill. In 1950 LOF renamed her again as London Statesman. In 1951 LOF sold her to Panamanian owners who renamed her Morella.

CSM had seven Liberty ships, three of which were transferred to LOF. Samflora had been built in 1943 and CSM renamed her Primrose Hill in 1947. LOF renamed her London Vendor in 1949 and sold her in 1951. Samdon had been built in 1943 and CSM renamed her Mill Hill in 1947. She too was transferred to LOF in 1949 and sold in 1951. Samleven had been built in 1944 and CSM renamed her Bisham Hill in 1947. She was transferred to LOF in October 1951 and sold in January 1952 to Liberian owners wno renamed her Nausica.

== Livery and personnel ==
LOF ships' hulls were red below the waterline and black above. The ships had white superstructures and carried the coat of arms of the City of London facing forward just below the bridge. The LOF funnel livery was buff, ringed by a white band above a blue band, with a five-pointed red star on the two bands. It was a variant of a livery that some CSM ships had used since the 1930s. The house flag was a pennant of white above blue bearing a red star. The white and blue referred to the Greek origins of the Kulukundis, Rethymnis and Mavroleon families. The red star made the funnel livery suggest that of a Soviet merchant fleet, which sometimes caused some confusion.

LOF ships always worked under charter. Under the terms of some charters, the ship's funnel would be repainted from LOF colours to those of the charterer.

LOF employed UK officers on salaries but used crew from India hired on contracts for limited periods. This allowed it to pay crew wages lower than those agreed between the General Council of British Shipping and the National Union of Seamen.

== LOF's first tankers ==
LOF ordered new tanker ships, starting with the sister ships London Pride (I) and London Enterprise (I) built by Furness Shipbuilding at Stockton-on-Tees and completed in 1950. LOF became a public company on 20 March 1951.

In 1952 LOF took delivery of five new tankers. Sir James Laing and Sons Ltd on the River Wear in Sunderland, completed the trio London Glory (I), London Endurance and London Spirit, while Furness Shipobuilding completed the slightly larger pair London Victory (I) and London Majesty.

LOF had intended to operate a mixed fleet of tankers and dry cargo ships. However, the costs of buying new tankers rose considerably so by the end of 1953 LOF sold all of its dry cargo ships. Between 1953 and 1955 Furness completed four more tankers for LOF. London Loyalty (1954) and London Integrity (1955) were sisters of London Victory and London Majesty. London Splendour (I) (1953) London Prestige (1954) were a much larger pair: 24,600 LT DWT each. When LOF ordered London Splendour nearly three years earlier, some oil companies regarded this as being almost the maximum size of tanker that they could ever use.

In 1959 the Admiralty bareboat chartered London Loyalty and London Integrity for the Royal Fleet Auxiliary, who renamed them RFA Brambleleaf and RFA Bayleaf respectively.

== Subsidiaries and joint ventures ==
In 1956 LOF in association with Philip Hill, Higginson & Co Ltd founded a subsidiary, London & Overseas Tankers, in Bermuda. LOT took a 50% interest in another Bermudian company, London & Overseas Bulk Carriers. LOT ordered six tankers and LOBC ordered two bulk carriers.

In 1957 LOF led a consortium of three companies that took over the Austin & Pickersgill shipyard in Sunderland. In 1968 A&P took over another Wearside shipyard, Bartram & Sons Ltd. In 1970 LOF bought out its partners to take 100% ownership of A&P.

== More and bigger tankers ==
LOF and LOT concentrated on ordering tankers as large as London Splendour and London Prestige. Splendour and Prestige, like LOF's smaller tankers, had Doxford marine diesel engines, but the ships that LOF and LOT ordered now followed the mid-1950s trend towards steam turbine engines for cargo ships. Furness Shipbuilding completed five 24,900 LT DWT turbine ships for the group: London Valour (1956), London Tradition (1957) and London Resolution (1957) for LOF, then Overseas Pioneer (1958) and Overseas Explorer (1959) for LOT. Each had a pair of Richardsons Westgarth turbines that developed a total of 8,200 shaft horsepower and double reduction-geared onto a single shaft to drive a single screw.

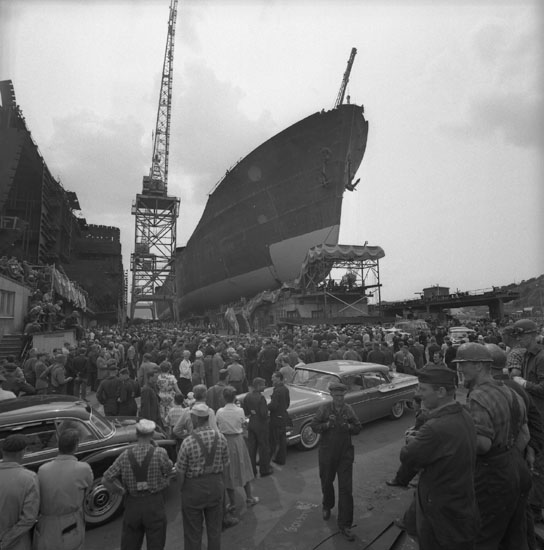
Overseas Ambassador about to be launched in Uddevalla on 12 June 1961

Koninklijke Maatschappij on the Scheldt in Flushing, Netherlands, completed two very dissimilar tankers for LOF: the 19,214 LT DWT London Harmony in 1959 and 31,781 LT DWT London Confidence in 1962. Uddevallavarvet AB of Uddevalla in Sweden completed three tankers: London Independence for LOF in 1961 and Overseas Ambassador and Overseas Discoverer for LOT in 1962. At more than 34,200 LT DWT each, the three sister ships from Uddevallavarvet set a new record for the largest ships in the LOF group's fleet.

== Back to dry cargo ships ==
Rheinstahl Nordseewerke of Emden in Germany completed two bulk carriers for London & Overseas Bulk Carriers: Overseas Courier in 1960 and Overseas Adventurer in 1963.

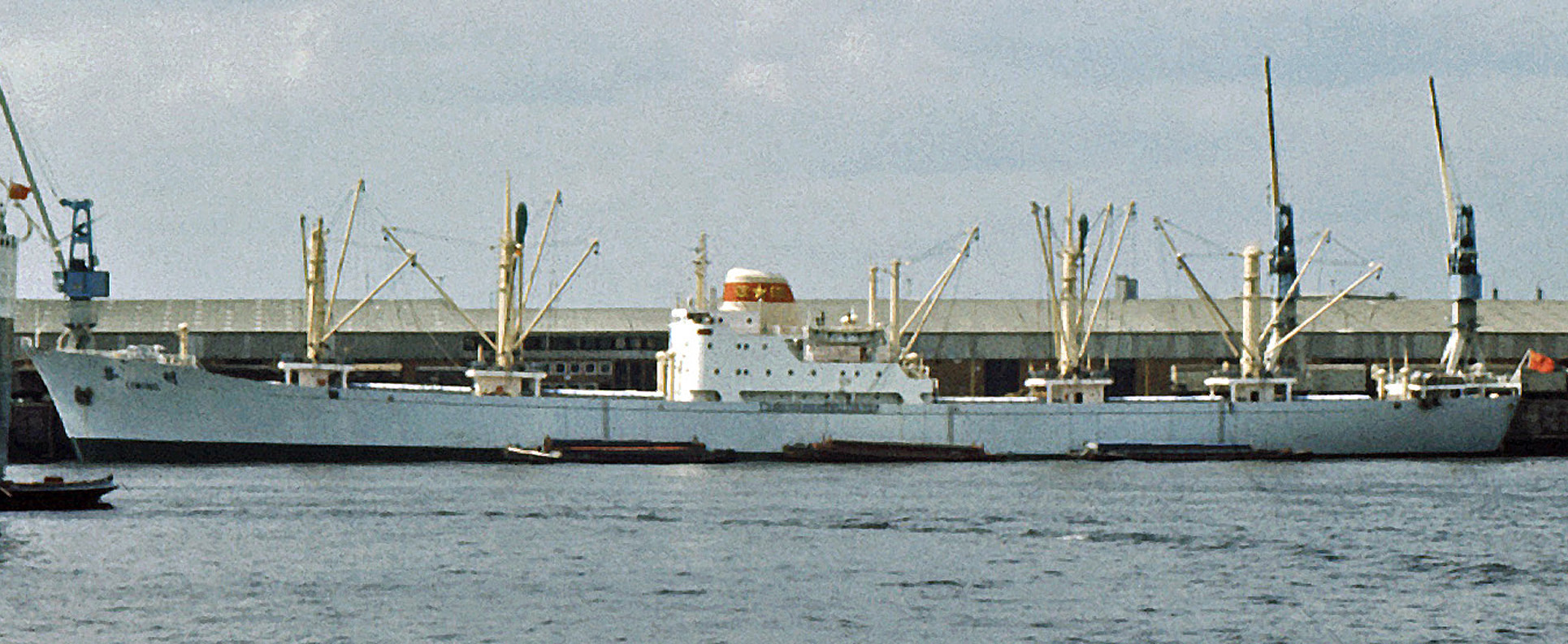
Li Ming, formerly London Tradesman, in Hamburg in 1973

LOF returned to dry cargo ships in 1963 with the sister ships London Craftsman, London Statesman and London Tradesman all from Uddevallavarvet and London Banker (II) from Bijker's Aannemingsbedrijk of Gorinchem on the IJssel in the Netherlands. Koninklijke Maatschappij completed London Advocate in 1964. In December 1964, only a year after London Tradesman was completed, LOF sold her to the China National Machinery Import and Export Corporation, and in 1965 LOF replaced her with a sister ship from Uddevallavarvet, London Citizen.

LOF's shift of emphasis to dry cargo continued when Industria Navali Meccaniche Affini in La Spezia, Italy, converted seven large tankers to bulk carriers: London Resolution, London Splendour (I), London Prestige and London Valour in 1966, London Tradition and Overseas Explorer (transferred to LOF and renamed London Explorer) in 1967 and Overseas Pioneer (transferred to LOF and renamed London Pioneer) in 1968.

== Mayfair Tankers ==
In the 1960s LOF created a subsidiary in Greece, Mayfair Tankers, to benefit from the lower taxes in that country. In 1965 LOF transferred at least three tankers to its subsidiary. London Endurance became Erato, London Glory became Giannina and London Spirit became Salamis. Erato and Giannina were scrapped in Spain in 1969 and Salamis was scrapped in Taiwan in 1970.

LOF transferred Mayfair Tankers to the flag of convenience of Liberia. The bulk carrier London Splendour (I) was registered in Liberia as Mayfair Splendour in 1970. In 1972 the Ministry of Defence (MoD) returned Brambleleaf (London Loyalty) to LOF, who transferred her to Mayfair Tankers and registered her in Liberia as Mayfair Loyalty. In 1973 the MoD returned Bayleaf (London Integrity) to LOF, who transferred her to Mayfair Tankers and registered her in Liberia as Mayfair Integrity.

Eventually LOF stopped operating ships via its Mayfair Tankers subsidiary. However, LOF continued transferring some ships to London & Overseas Tankers in order to pay less tax. These ships included Overseas Adventurer, Overseas Ambassador, Overseas Argonaut, Overseas Courier, Overseas Discoverer, Overseas Explorer and Overseas Pioneer.

== The 1970s ==
In 1971 Kockums of Malmö in Sweden completed LOF's first supertanker, named London Pride (II) after the tanker of the same name launched in 1950. At 255,090 LT DWT she was a VLCC, larger than any other LOF ship before or since.

On 10 July 1972 London Statesman was unloading a cargo of rice at Nha Trang in South Vietnam when her engine room flooded and she sank by the stern. Sabotage by the Viet Cong was suspected. On 31 July she was refloated and towed to Singapore for repairs. She remained in the LOF fleet until 1979.

In 1973 the MoD bareboat chartered Overseas Adventurer as RFA Cherryleaf.

LOF modernised its dry cargo fleet with four new SD14 shelter deck ships built by its A&P subsidiary: London Cavalier, London Fusilier and London Grenadier in 1972 and the London Bombardier in 1973.

The tanker fleet was modernised with three 138,680 LT DWT ships built by Götaverken of Hisingen in Sweden. These were London Enterprise (II), completed in 1974 for LOF, London Glory (II), completed in 1975 for a LOF subsidiary called London Shipowning Co Ltd and Overseas Argonaut, completed in 1975 for a new company, Seagroup Bermuda, in which LOF held 50% of the shares.

LOF then modernised its bulk carrier fleet with three new B26 ships built by A&P: London Baron, London Earl and London Viscount, all completed in 1977.

== Welsh Ore Carriers ==
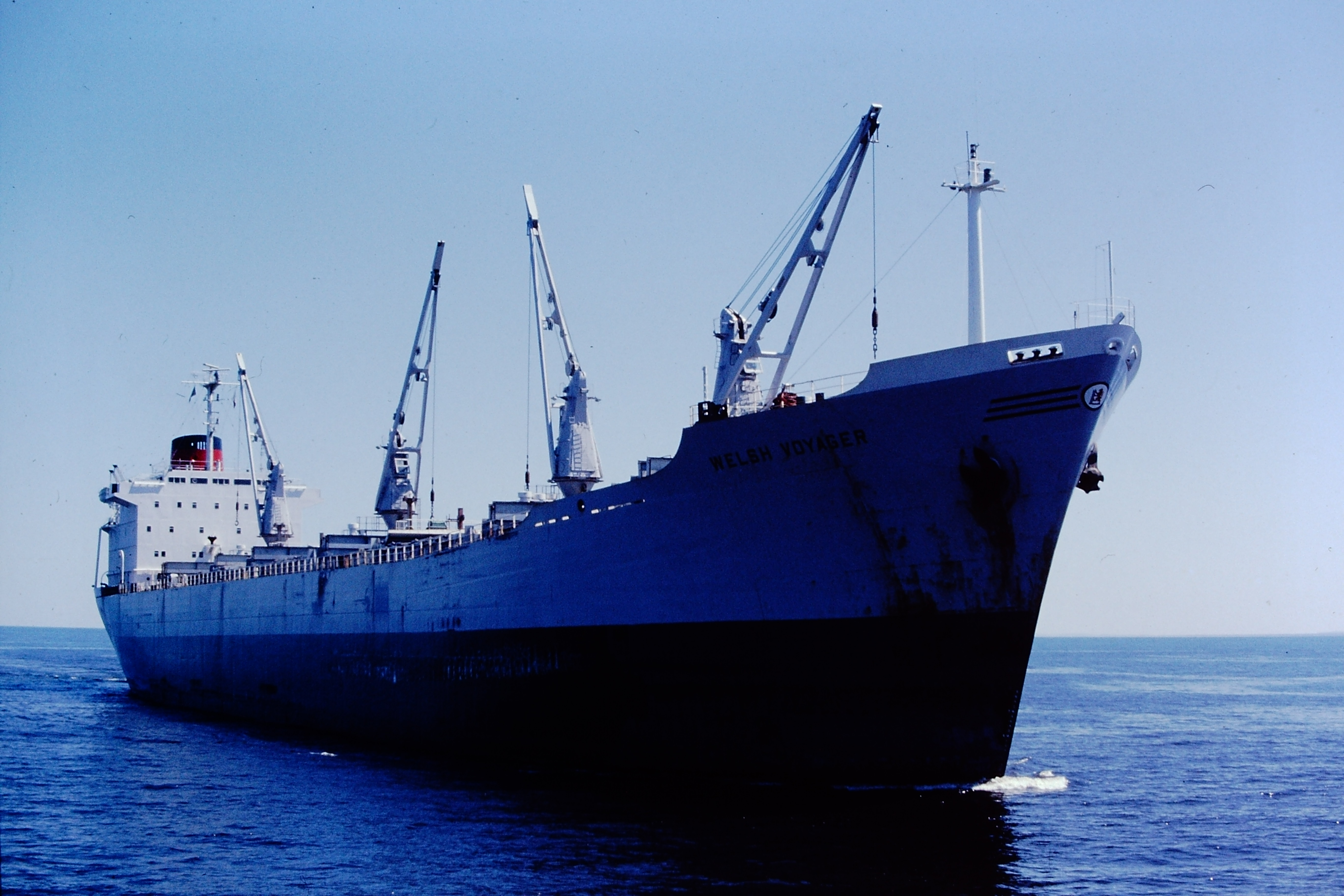
The B26 bulk carrier Welsh Voyager in Duluth in 1978

LOF bought a 50% share in Welsh Ore Carriers in 1961 and a further 1% in 1969. Under LOF control WOC bought new ships from A&P and Bartram including Welsh Herald in 1963, the SD14 shelter deck cargo ships Welsh Trident in 1973 and Welsh Troubadour in 1974 and the B26 bulk carrier Welsh Voyager in 1977. WOC was renamed Welsh Overseas Freighters in 1977 and LOF bought the remaining 49% of shares from the West Wales Steamship Co in 1982. By then WOC had sold its SD14's, but Welsh Voyager joined the LOF fleet as London Voyager.

== Adversity and restructuring ==
LOF's profitability was reduced by the 1973 oil crisis and the 1977 nationalisation of the UK's shipbuilding industry. LOF laid up a number of its ships in a bay near Piraeus in Greece, including the London Pride (II) in 1981. LOF sold London Pride (II) in 1982 and she was scrapped in the Far East in 1983.

LOF returned to smaller tankers with the Panamax-sized London Victory (II) and London Spirit (II) completed by Mitsui in Japan in 1982. These were joined by London Enterprise (III), completed by Mitsui in 1992. After about 1986 the business began to recover. In 1989 Chevron made a two-year charter for London Victory, later expanded into a five-year charter for both her and her sister ship London Spirit.

In 1992 LOF moved to Bermuda to restructure its debts. Mitsui completed three new Suezmax tankers for the fleet: London Pride (III) in 1993 for charter to Chevron and London Glory (III) and London Splendour (II) in 1995 for spot market tramp trading.

In June 1995 Chevron's charters of London Spirit and London Victory expired. Chevron closed two of its refineries that year and did not renew the charters.

== Sale of the fleet ==
In 1997 a Swedish shipping company, Frontline Shipping AB, also moved its operations to Bermuda. Frontline took a 51% controlling share in LOF, ending its independent history 49 years after its incorporation. Frontline renamed the Suezmax tankers London Pride (III), London Glory (III) and London Splendour (II) as Front Pride, Front Glory and Front Splendour respectively. The ships' actual owner was the Bermuda-registered Ship Finance Limited (SFL), for which Frontline is the ship management company.

In February 2013, SFL terminated Front Pride's charter, and sold her to new owners who shortened her name to Pride. With subsequent changes of owner, she was renamed Pacific in 2015, Gvenour in 2017, Magus in 2020, Freedom in 2021, and Dolphin later in 2021. She was renamed Zulu in 2023 and Mia in 2024, and may still be trading. Front Splendour was sold, apparently in 2015, and renamed Cheval Bleu. Sources disagree as to whether she is still trading, or has been scrapped. Front Glory had been sold by 2016, and renamed Distya Akula. She may now have been scrapped.
