= Mavroleon family =

Greek shipping family

The Mavroleon family is a Greek family of shipping magnates with strong United Kingdom connections.

He had two sons, Nicolas Mavroleon and Manuel Basil Mavroleon, generally known by his nickname "Bluey" (1927/1932–2009), who was educated in England and served in the Grenadier Guards. Bluey went on to run the firm but moved to Switzerland when the 1974–1979 Labour Government nationalised Austin and Pickersgill shipbuilders in which LOF was the largest shareholder. He was married four times (among whom in 1963 Camilla Paravicini, granddaughter of British writer W. Somerset Maugham, through Mary Elizabeth Maugham) and left four children and six grandchildren.

Bluey had two sons with Mexican-born Gioconda de Gallardo y Castro.

Nicholas was educated at Eton and Aiglon College, and later married actress Barbara Carrera. Carlos was educated at Eton and Harvard before becoming a member of the Mujahideen, with whom he fought against the Red Army in Afghanistan. A professional journalist, he died in Peshawar in 1998 while on assignment for CBS reporting on Operation Infinite Reach.

== See also ==
- Eddie Kulukundis
