= World Ship Society =

The World Ship Society (WSS) is an international society devoted to maritime and naval history. Founded in 1946 as Ship News Club to distribute shipping information to correspondents, the society now has thousands of members in dozens of branches across the world. It publishes the monthly magazine Marine News and the quarterly magazine Warships for its membership.

== History ==
In 1946 Michael Crowdy started a mailing list in the United Kingdom. To share a growing amount of information regarding ships, Crowdy founded the Ships News Club and published two news lists covering all ships in alphabetical order. These two lists, published in 1947, are acknowledged by the WSS to be the first two editions of Marine News.

From 50 correspondents at the start of 1947, by the end of the year members of the Ship News Club numbered 200 and 330 in July 1948. Notable amongst its early members were the editor of Jane's Fighting Ships, Francis McMurtrie, and former editor and noted naval historian Oscar Parkes. By February 1949 there were members in Europe and as far away as New Zealand.

The club's first annual general meeting was held on 23 September 1949 aboard HMS Wellington in London. There it was resolved to change the name of the club to World Ship Society. Another proposed name discussed at the 1949 AGM was the International Shiplovers' Society.

== Present ==
The society has 50 branches throughout the world that promote historical research. Staffed by volunteers the society maintains a Central Record and Photo Libraries, as well as a library and reading room in Chatham, Kent. As well as its magazine publications, Marine News and Warships, the society has published many books by members.
