= Kulukundis =

Kulukundis is a surname. Notable people with the surname include:

- Cassandra Kulukundis, Greek American casting director
- Eddie Kulukundis (1932–2021), British-Greek shipping magnate and philanthropist
- Manuel Kulukundis (1898–1988), Greek shipping magnate
