= List of accolades received by The Secret Agent (2025 film) =

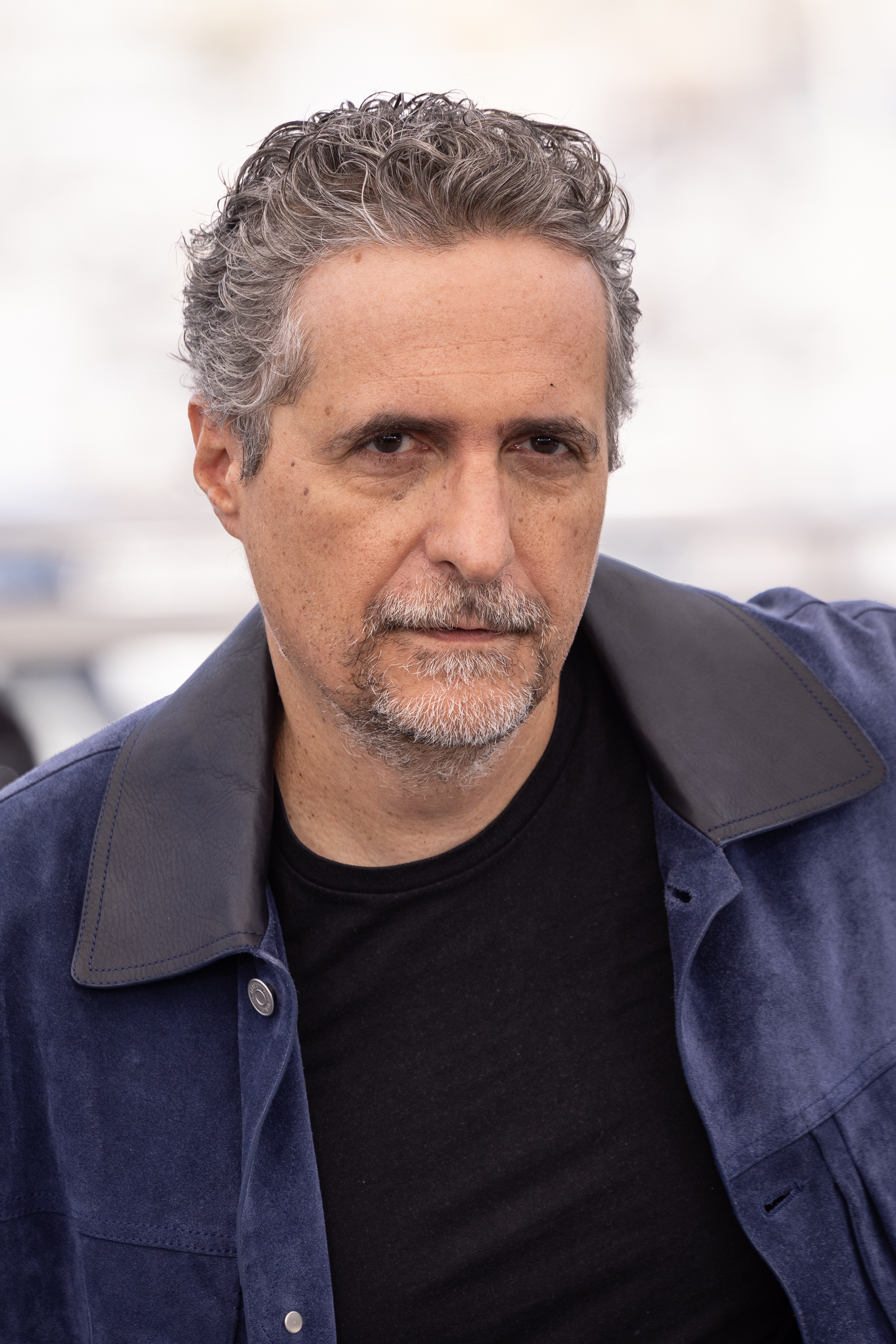
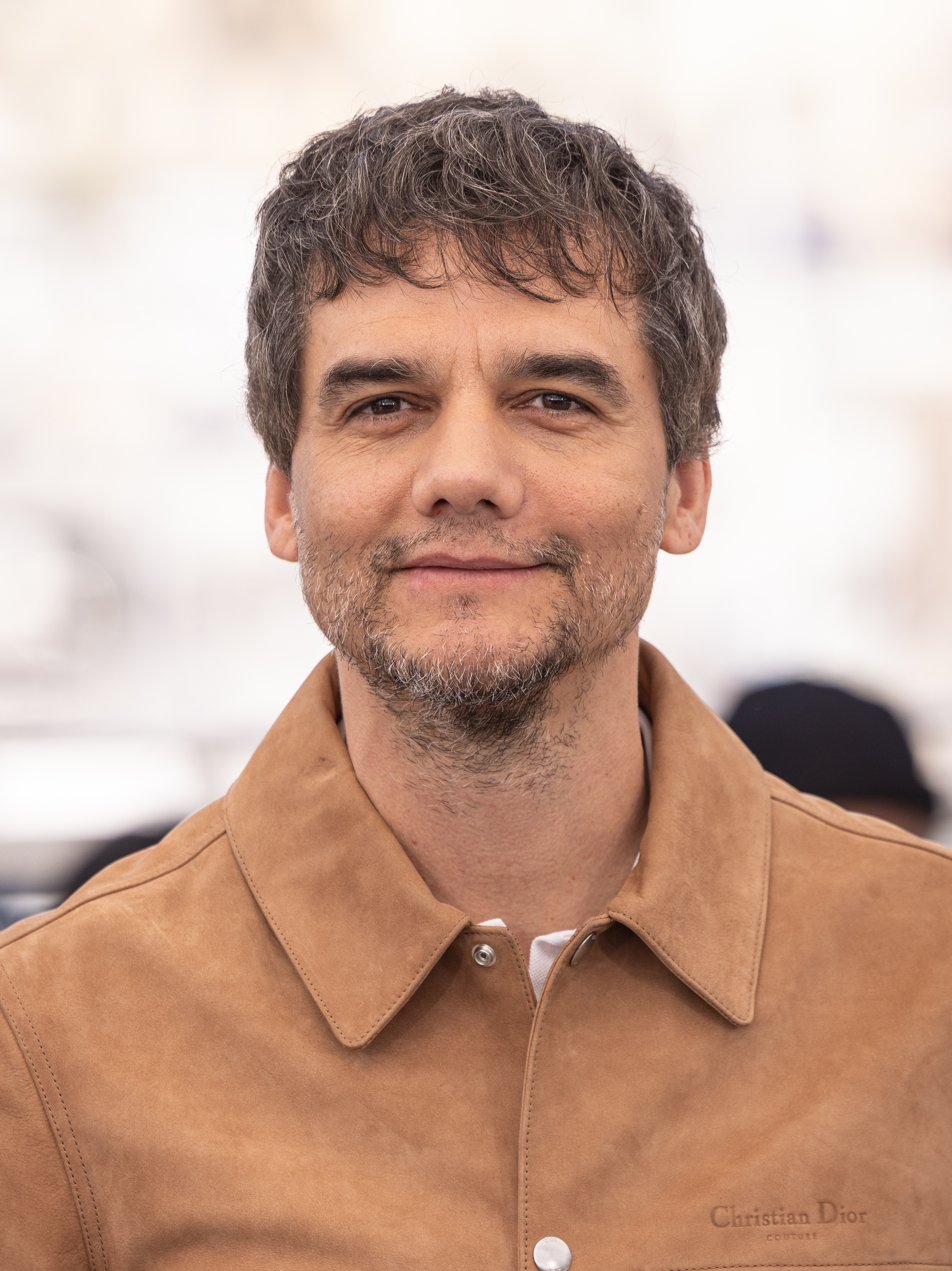
- Kleber Mendonça Filho (left) received accolades for his screenplay and direction, while Wagner Moura (right) received for his performance
Accolades
Award	Wins	Nominations
AARP Movies for Grownups Awards	0	1
Academy Awards	0	4
Alliance of Women Film Journalists	0	3
The Astra Awards	1	3
Austin Film Critics Association	2	4
Biarritz International Festival of Latin American Cinema	1	1
Boston Online Film Critics Association	2	2
British Academy Film Awards	0	2
Cannes Film Festival	4	5
César Awards	0	1
Chicago Film Critics Association	0	2
Chicago International Film Festival	1	2
Critics Choice Awards Celebration of Latino Cinema & Television	1	1
Critics' Choice Movie Awards	1	2
Dallas–Fort Worth Film Critics Association	1	1
Dorian Awards	0	1
Film Festival Cologne	1	1
Film Independent Spirit Awards	1	1
Florida Film Critics Circle	0	4
Gáldar International Film Festival	1	1
Golden Globe Awards	2	3
Gotham Independent Film Awards	0	2
Hamburg International Film Festival	1	2
Havana Film Festival	5	6
Houston Film Critics Society	0	3
IndieWire Critics Poll	6	6
IndieWire Honors	1	1
International Cinephile Society	7	10
International Federation of Film Critics	0	1
Jerusalem Film Festival	1	1
Latin Grammy Awards	1	1
Lima Film Festival	3	3
London Film Critics' Circle	0	2
Los Angeles Film Critics Association	3	3
Lumière Awards	1	1
Middleburg Film Festival	1	1
Miskolc International Film Festival	1	1
NAACP Image Awards	0	1
National Board of Review	1	1
National Society of Film Critics	4	4
New York Film Critics Circle	2	2
New York Film Critics Online	0	2
Newport Beach Film Festival	1	1
Online Film Critics Society	1	3
Palm Springs International Film Festival	0	1
Paris Film Critics Awards	1	3
Platino Awards	7	8
San Diego Film Critics Society	0	2
San Francisco Bay Area Film Critics Circle	0	2
San Sebastián International Film Festival	0	1
Santa Barbara International Film Festival	1	1
São Paulo Art Critics Association	3	6
Satellite Awards	2	2
Seattle Film Critics Society Awards	0	1
Southeastern Film Critics Association	1	1
St. Louis Film Critics Association Awards	0	3
Stockholm International Film Festival	1	2
Sydney Film Festival	0	1
Toronto Film Critics Awards	2	2
Virginia Film Festival	1	1
Washington D.C. Area Film Critics Association	0	1
Zurich Film Festival	1	1

Totals (Note: Certain award groups do not simply award one winner. They acknowledge several different recipients, have runners-up, and have third place. Since this is a specific recognition and is different from losing an award, runner-up mentions are considered wins in this award tally. For simplification and to avoid errors, each award in this list has been presumed to have had a prior nomination.)
- Wins: 102
- Nominations: 209

The Secret Agent (Portuguese: O Agente Secreto) is a 2025 neo-noir historical political thriller film written and directed by Kleber Mendonça Filho. It star Wagner Moura as Armando, a former professor caught in the political turmoil in the midst of the Brazilian military dictatorship, attempting to flee persecution and resist an authoritarian regime.

The film premiered at the 2025 Cannes Film Festival on 18 May 2025, where it won Best Director for Mendonça Filho and Best Actor award for Moura. It was released in Brazil and Germany on 6 November 2025, and in France on 17 December 2025. The film received acclaim from critics. On the review aggregator website Rotten Tomatoes, the film holds an approval rating of 98% based on 219 reviews. Metacritic calculated a weighted average score of 91/100 based on 40 reviews, indicating "universal acclaim".

The Secret Agent has received several awards and nominations from critical and industry groups. It received four nominations at the 98th Academy Awards, including Best Picture. At the 83rd Golden Globe Awards, the film was nominated for Best Motion Picture – Drama, while winning the awards for Best Foreign Language Film and Best Actor in a Motion Picture – Drama for Moura. It also was nominated for Best Original Screenplay and Best Film Not in the English Language at the 79th British Academy Film Awards.

== Accolades ==
Award	Date of ceremony	Category	Recipient(s)	Result	Ref.
ABC (Brazilian Society of Cinematographers) Award for Cinematography	16 May 2026	Best Art Direction	Thales Junqueira	Won	
ABC (Brazilian Society of Cinematographers) Award for Cinematography	16 May 2026	Best Sound	Ciryl Holtz, Moabe Filho, Pedrinho Moreira and Tijn Hazen	Nominated	
AARP Movies for Grownups Awards	10 January 2026	Best Foreign-Language Film	The Secret Agent	Nominated	
ABRA Screenwriting Award	26 May 2026	Best Original Screenplay	Kleber Mendonça Filho	Won	
Academy Awards	15 March 2026	Best Picture	Emilie Lesclaux	Nominated	
Academy Awards	15 March 2026	Best Actor	Wagner Moura	Nominated	
Academy Awards	15 March 2026	Best Casting	Gabriel Domingues	Nominated	
Academy Awards	15 March 2026	Best International Feature Film	The Secret Agent	Nominated	
Alliance of Women Film Journalists	31 December 2025	Best Film	The Secret Agent	Nominated	
Alliance of Women Film Journalists	31 December 2025	Best Actor	Wagner Moura	Nominated	
Alliance of Women Film Journalists	31 December 2025	Best International Feature	The Secret Agent	Nominated	
The Astra Awards	9 January 2026	Best Actor – Drama	Wagner Moura	Nominated	
The Astra Awards	9 January 2026	Best International Feature	The Secret Agent	Nominated	
The Astra Awards	9 January 2026	Acting Achievement Award	Wagner Moura	Honored	
Atlanta Film Critics Circle	3 December 2025	Top 10 Films	The Secret Agent	Won	
Austin Film Critics Association	18 December 2025	Best Film	The Secret Agent	6th place	
Austin Film Critics Association	18 December 2025	Best International Film	The Secret Agent	Won	
Austin Film Critics Association	18 December 2025	Best Actor	Wagner Moura	Nominated	
Austin Film Critics Association	18 December 2025	Best Original Screenplay	Kleber Mendonça Filho	Nominated	
Biarritz International Festival of Latin American Cinema	18 September 2025	Abrazo d'honneur	Kleber Mendonça Filho	Won	
Black Film Critics Circle	20 December 2025	Top Ten Films of 2025	The Secret Agent	7th place	
Boston Online Film Critics Association	19 December 2025	Best Film	The Secret Agent	9th place	
Boston Online Film Critics Association	19 December 2025	Best Actor	Wagner Moura	Won	
Brazil Online Film Award	7 March 2026	Best Film	The Secret Agent	Won	
Brazil Online Film Award	7 March 2026	Best Director	Kleber Mendonça Filho	Won	
Brazil Online Film Award	7 March 2026	Best Actor	Wagner Moura	Won	
Brazil Online Film Award	7 March 2026	Best Screenplay	Kleber Mendonça Filho	Runner-up	
Brazil Online Film Award	7 March 2026	Best Ensemble	Gabriel Domingues	Won	
Brazil Online Film Award	7 March 2026	Best Cinematography	Evgenia Alexandrova	Won	
Brazil Online Film Award	7 March 2026	Best Editing	Eduardo Serrano e Matheus Farias	Nominated	
Brazil Online Film Award	7 March 2026	Best Production Design	Thales Junqueira	Won	
Brazil Online Film Award	7 March 2026	Best Costume Design	Rita Azevedo	Nominated	
Brazil Online Film Award	7 March 2026	Best Brazilian Film	The Secret Agent	Won	
British Academy Film Awards	22 February 2026	Best Original Screenplay	Kleber Mendonça Filho	Nominated	
British Academy Film Awards	22 February 2026	Best Film Not in the English Language	Kleber Mendonça Filho and Emilie Lesclaux	Nominated	
Cannes Film Festival	24 May 2025	Palme d'Or	Kleber Mendonça Filho	Nominated	
Cannes Film Festival	24 May 2025	FIPRESCI Prize	Kleber Mendonça Filho	Won	
Cannes Film Festival	24 May 2025	Prix des Cinémas Art et Essai	Kleber Mendonça Filho	Won	
Cannes Film Festival	24 May 2025	Best Director	Kleber Mendonça Filho	Won	
Cannes Film Festival	24 May 2025	Best Actor	Wagner Moura	Won	
César Awards	26 February 2026	Best Foreign Film	The Secret Agent	Nominated	
Chicago Film Critics Association	11 December 2025	Best Actor	Wagner Moura	Nominated	
Chicago Film Critics Association	11 December 2025	Best Foreign Language Film	The Secret Agent	Nominated	
Chicago International Film Festival	24 October 2025	Gold Hugo	The Secret Agent	Nominated	
Chicago International Film Festival	24 October 2025	Best Actor	Wagner Moura	Won	
Columbus Film Critics Association	8 January 2026	Best Lead Performance	Wagner Moura	Nominated	
Columbus Film Critics Association	8 January 2026	Best Foreign Language Film	The Secret Agent	Nominated	
Critics Choice Awards Celebration of Latino Cinema & Television	24 October 2025	Director Award	Kleber Mendonça Filho	Won	
Critics' Choice Movie Awards	4 January 2026	Best Actor	Wagner Moura	Nominated	
Critics' Choice Movie Awards	4 January 2026	Best Foreign Language Film	The Secret Agent	Won	
Dallas–Fort Worth Film Critics Association	17 December 2025	Best Foreign Language Film	The Secret Agent	3rd place	
Dorian Awards	3 March 2026	Non-English Language Film of the Year	The Secret Agent	Nominated	
Edda Awards	TBA	International Film of the Year	The Secret Agent	Pending	
Film Festival Cologne	6 October 2025	The Hollywood Reporter Award for Best of Cinema Fiction	Kleber Mendonça Filho	Won	
Film Independent Spirit Awards	15 February 2026	Best International Feature Film	The Secret Agent	Won	
Florida Film Critics Circle	19 December 2025	Best Actor	Wagner Moura	Nominated	
Florida Film Critics Circle	19 December 2025	Best Ensemble	The Secret Agent	Nominated	
Florida Film Critics Circle	19 December 2025	Best Production Design	Thales Junqueira	Nominated	
Florida Film Critics Circle	19 December 2025	Best Foreign Language Film	The Secret Agent	Nominated	
Gáldar International Film Festival	27 October 2025	Best Feature Film	The Secret Agent	Won	
Gold Derby Film Awards	25 February 2026	Best Picture	The Secret Agent	Nominated	
Gold Derby Film Awards	25 February 2026	Best Actor	Wagner Moura	Nominated	
Gold Derby Film Awards	25 February 2026	Best Original Screenplay	Kleber Mendonça Filho	Nominated	
Gold Derby Film Awards	25 February 2026	Best International Feature Film	The Secret Agent	Nominated	
Golden Globe Awards	11 January 2026	Best Motion Picture – Drama	The Secret Agent	Nominated	
Golden Globe Awards	11 January 2026	Best Foreign Language Film	The Secret Agent	Won	
Golden Globe Awards	11 January 2026	Best Actor in a Motion Picture – Drama	Wagner Moura	Won	
Gotham Independent Film Awards	1 December 2025	Best Original Screenplay	Kleber Mendonça Filho	Nominated	
Gotham Independent Film Awards	1 December 2025	Outstanding Lead Performance	Wagner Moura	Nominated	
Grande Otelo Awards	4 August 2026	Best Film	The Secret Agent	Won	
Grande Otelo Awards	4 August 2026	Best Director	Kleber Mendonça Filho	Nominated	
Grande Otelo Awards	4 August 2026	Best Actress	Tânia Maria	Nominated	
Grande Otelo Awards	4 August 2026	Best Actor	Wagner Moura	Nominated	
Grande Otelo Awards	4 August 2026	Best Supporting Actress	Alice Carvalho	Nominated	
Grande Otelo Awards	4 August 2026	Best Supporting Actress	Hermila Guedes	Nominated	
Grande Otelo Awards	4 August 2026	Best Supporting Actor	Carlos Francisco	Nominated	
Grande Otelo Awards	4 August 2026	Best Supporting Actor	Gabriel Leone	Nominated	
Grande Otelo Awards	4 August 2026	Best Supporting Actor	Robério Diogenes	Nominated	
Grande Otelo Awards	4 August 2026	Best Original Screenplay	Kleber Mendonça Filho	Nominated	
Grande Otelo Awards	4 August 2026	Best Cinematography	Evgenia Alexandrova	Won	
Grande Otelo Awards	4 August 2026	Best Art Direction	Thales Junqueira	Won	
Grande Otelo Awards	4 August 2026	Best Costume Design	Rita Azevedo	Nominated	
Grande Otelo Awards	4 August 2026	Best Make-Up	Marisa Amenta	Nominated	
Grande Otelo Awards	4 August 2026	Best Editing (Fiction)	Eduardo Serrano, Matheus Farias	Nominated	
Grande Otelo Awards	4 August 2026	Best Visual Effects	Alexandre Boiron, Luuk Meijer, David Van Heeswijk	Won	
Grande Otelo Awards	4 August 2026	Best Sound	Pedro Moreira, Moabe Filho, Tijn Hazen, Cyril Holtz	Nominated	
Grande Otelo Awards	4 August 2026	Best Original Score	Tomas Alves Souza, Mateus Alves	Nominated	
Hamburg International Film Festival	8 October 2025	Hamburg Producers Award	The Secret Agent	Nominated	
Hamburg International Film Festival	8 October 2025	Arthouse Cinema Award	The Secret Agent	Won	
Havana Film Festival	12 December 2025	Best Film	The Secret Agent	Nominated	
Havana Film Festival	12 December 2025	Best Director	Kleber Mendonça Filho	Won	
Havana Film Festival	12 December 2025	Best Screenplay	Kleber Mendonça Filho	Won	
Havana Film Festival	12 December 2025	Best Production Design	Thales Junqueira	Won	
Havana Film Festival	12 December 2025	Best Editing	Eduardo Serrano and Matheus Farias	Won	
Havana Film Festival	12 December 2025	Best Original Score	Tomaz Alves Souza and Mateus Alves	Won	
Hawaii Film Critics Society	12 January 2026	Best Actor	Wagner Moura	Nominated	
Hawaii Film Critics Society	12 January 2026	Best Foreign Language Film	The Secret Agent	Nominated	
Houston Film Critics Society	20 January 2026	Best Picture	The Secret Agent	Nominated	
Houston Film Critics Society	20 January 2026	Best Actor	Wagner Moura	Nominated	
Houston Film Critics Society	20 January 2026	Best Foreign Language Feature	The Secret Agent	Nominated	
IndieWire Critics Poll	15 December 2025	Best Film	The Secret Agent	5th place	
IndieWire Critics Poll	15 December 2025	Best Director	Kleber Mendonça Filho	3rd place	
IndieWire Critics Poll	15 December 2025	Best Performance	Wagner Moura	3rd place	
IndieWire Critics Poll	15 December 2025	Best Screenplay	Kleber Mendonça Filho	5th place	
IndieWire Critics Poll	15 December 2025	Best Cinematography	Evgenia Alexandrova	6th place	
IndieWire Critics Poll	15 December 2025	Best International Film	The Secret Agent	3rd place	
IndieWire Honors	4 December 2025	Performance Award	Wagner Moura	Won	
International Cinephile Society	8 February 2026	Best Picture	The Secret Agent	Won	
International Cinephile Society	8 February 2026	Best Director	Kleber Mendonça Filho	Won	
International Cinephile Society	8 February 2026	Best Actor	Wagner Moura	Won	
International Cinephile Society	8 February 2026	Best Supporting Actress	Tânia Maria	Won	
International Cinephile Society	8 February 2026	Best Original Screenplay	Kleber Mendonça Filho	Won	
International Cinephile Society	8 February 2026	Best Ensemble	The Secret Agent	Won	
International Cinephile Society	8 February 2026	Best Cinematography	Evgenia Alexandrova	Nominated	
International Cinephile Society	8 February 2026	Best Editing	Matheus Farias and Eduardo Serrano	Runner-up	
International Cinephile Society	8 February 2026	Best Production Design	Thales Junqueira	Nominated	
International Cinephile Society	8 February 2026	Best Sound Design	Tijn Hazen	Nominated	
International Federation of Film Critics	21 September 2025	Grand Prix for Best Film of the Year	The Secret Agent	Nominated	
Jerusalem Film Festival	25 July 2025	Best International Film	The Secret Agent	Won	
Latin Grammy Awards	12 November 2026	Best Music for Visual Media	Tomas Alves Souza and Mateus Alves	Won	
Latino Entertainment Journalists Association	9 February 2026	Best Picture	The Secret Agent	Nominated	
Latino Entertainment Journalists Association	9 February 2026	Best Director	Kleber Mendonça Filho	Nominated	
Latino Entertainment Journalists Association	9 February 2026	Best Actor	Wagner Moura	Won	
Latino Entertainment Journalists Association	9 February 2026	Best Supporting Actress	Tânia Maria	Nominated	
Latino Entertainment Journalists Association	9 February 2026	Best Original Screenplay	Kleber Mendonça Filho	Nominated	
Latino Entertainment Journalists Association	9 February 2026	Best Ensemble Casting	Gabriel Domingues	Nominated	
Latino Entertainment Journalists Association	9 February 2026	Best Cinematography	Evgenia Alexandrova	Nominated	
Latino Entertainment Journalists Association	9 February 2026	Best Editing	Matheus Farias and Eduardo Serrano	Nominated}	
Latino Entertainment Journalists Association	9 February 2026	Best Production Design	Thales Junqueira	Nominated	
Latino Entertainment Journalists Association	9 February 2026	Best Costume Design	Rita Azevedo	Nominated	
Latino Entertainment Journalists Association	9 February 2026	Best Non-English Language	The Secret Agent	Won	
Lima Film Festival	16 September 2025	Trophy Spondylus	The Secret Agent	Won	
Lima Film Festival	16 September 2025	International Critics' Jury Award for Best Film	The Secret Agent	Won	
Lima Film Festival	16 September 2025	Latin American Fiction Competition - Honorable Mention	The Secret Agent	Won	
Lisbon & Estoril Film Festival	15 November 2025	Tribute Award	Wagner Moura	Honored	
London Film Critics' Circle	1 February 2026	Foreign Language Film of the Year	The Secret Agent	Nominated	
London Film Critics' Circle	1 February 2026	Actor of the Year	Wagner Moura	Nominated	
Los Angeles Film Critics Association	7 December 2025	Best Picture	The Secret Agent	Runner-up	
Los Angeles Film Critics Association	7 December 2025	Best Lead Performance	Wagner Moura	Runner-up	
Los Angeles Film Critics Association	7 December 2025	Best Foreign Language Film	The Secret Agent	Won	
Lumière Awards	18 January 2026	Best International Co-Production	The Secret Agent	Won	
Macondo Awards	25 October 2026	Best Ibero-American Film – FIACINE	The Secret Agent	Won	
Middleburg Film Festival	19 October 2025	International Spotlight Award	Kleber Mendonça Filho	Won	
Miskolc International Film Festival	13 September 2025	Emeric Pressburger Award	The Secret Agent	Nominated	
Music City Film Critics' Association	12 January 2026	Best International Film	The Secret Agent	Won	
NAACP Image Awards	28 February 2026	Outstanding International Motion Picture	The Secret Agent	Nominated	
National Board of Review	3 December 2025	Top Five International Films	The Secret Agent	Won	
National Society of Film Critics	3 January 2026	Best Picture	The Secret Agent	3rd place	
National Society of Film Critics	3 January 2026	Best Actor	Wagner Moura	Runner-up	
National Society of Film Critics	3 January 2026	Best Screenplay	Kleber Mendonça Filho	3rd place	
National Society of Film Critics	3 January 2026	Best Film Not in the English Languange	The Secret Agent	Won	
New Jersey Film Critics Circle	31 December 2025	Best Picture	The Secret Agent	Nominated	
New Jersey Film Critics Circle	31 December 2025	Best International Feature	The Secret Agent	Nominated	
New York Film Critics Circle	2 December 2025	Best Foreign Language Film	The Secret Agent	Won	
New York Film Critics Circle	2 December 2025	Best Actor	Wagner Moura	Won	
New York Film Critics Online	15 December 2025	Best Actor	Wagner Moura	Nominated	
New York Film Critics Online	15 December 2025	Best International Feature	The Secret Agent	Nominated	
New York Film Festival	8 January 2026	Golden Beast Trophy	Carminha cat (characters Liza e Elis)	Won	
Newport Beach Film Festival	6 November 2025	Outstanding Performance	Wagner Moura	Won	
Online Association of Female Film Critics	19 December 2025	Best Male Lead	Wagner Moura	Nominated	
Online Association of Female Film Critics	19 December 2025	Best International Feature	The Secret Agent	Nominated	
Pandora International Film Critics Awards	21 December 2025	Best Actor	Wagner Moura	Won	
Puerto Rico Critics Association	2 January 2026	Best Picture	The Secret Agent	Nominated	
Puerto Rico Critics Association	2 January 2026	Best Actor	Wagner Moura	Runner-up	
Puerto Rico Critics Association	2 January 2026	Best Original Screenplay	Kleber Mendonça Filho	Nominated	
Puerto Rico Critics Association	2 January 2026	Best International Feature	The Secret Agent	Runner-up	
Puerto Rico Critics Association	2 January 2026	Best Film Editing	Eduardo Serrano and Matheus Farias	Nominated	
Online Film Critics Society	26 January 2026	Best Picture	The Secret Agent	5th place	
Online Film Critics Society	26 January 2026	Best Actor	Wagner Moura	Nominated	
Online Film Critics Society	26 January 2026	Best Film Not in the English Language	The Secret Agent	Nominated	
Online Film & Television Association	15 February 2026	Best Picture	The Secret Agent	Nominated	
Online Film & Television Association	15 February 2026	Best Actor	Wagner Moura	Nominated	
Online Film & Television Association	15 February 2026	Best Foreign Language Film	The Secret Agent	Nominated	
Palm Springs International Film Festival	12 January 2026	Best International Feature Film	The Secret Agent	Nominated	
Paris Film Critics Awards	8 February 2026	Best Picture	The Secret Agent	Nominated	
Paris Film Critics Awards	8 February 2026	Best Director	Kleber Mendonça Filho	Nominated	
Paris Film Critics Awards	8 February 2026	Best Actor	Wagner Moura	Won	
Pingyao International Film Festival	29 September 2025	Gala-Best Film (People Choice Award)	The Secret Agent	Won	
Platino Awards	9 May 2026	Best Ibero-American Film	The Secret Agent	Won	
Platino Awards	9 May 2026	Best Director	Kleber Mendonça Filho	Won	
Platino Awards	9 May 2026	Best Actor	Wagner Moura	Won	
Platino Awards	9 May 2026	Best Screenplay	Kleber Mendonça Filho	Won	
Platino Awards	9 May 2026	Best Film Editing	Eduardo Serrano and Matheus Farias	Won	
Platino Awards	9 May 2026	Best Original Score	Tomas Alves Souza and Mateus Alves	Won	
Platino Awards	9 May 2026	Best Art Direction	Thales Junqueira	Won	
Platino Awards	9 May 2026	Best Costume Design	Rita Azevedo	Nominated	
San Diego Film Critics Society	15 December 2025	Best Actor	Wagner Moura	Nominated	
San Diego Film Critics Society	15 December 2025	Best Foreign Language Film	The Secret Agent	Nominated	
San Francisco Bay Area Film Critics Circle	14 December 2025	Best Actor	Wagner Moura	Nominated	
San Francisco Bay Area Film Critics Circle	14 December 2025	Best International Feature Film	The Secret Agent	Nominated	
San Sebastián International Film Festival	24 September 2025	City of Donostia (San Sebastian Audience Award)	The Secret Agent	Nominated	
Santa Barbara International Film Festival	8 February 2026	Virtuoso Award	Wagner Moura	Won	
São Paulo Art Critics Association (APCA)	27 January 2026	Best Picture	The Secret Agent	Won	
São Paulo Art Critics Association (APCA)	27 January 2026	Best Director	Kleber Mendonça Filho	Nominated	
São Paulo Art Critics Association (APCA)	27 January 2026	Best Screenplay	Kleber Mendonça Filho	Nominated	
São Paulo Art Critics Association (APCA)	27 January 2026	Best Actor	Wagner Moura	Won	
São Paulo Art Critics Association (APCA)	27 January 2026	Best Actress	Alice Carvalho	Nominated	
São Paulo Art Critics Association (APCA)	27 January 2026	Special Jury Prize	Tânia Maria	Honored	
Satellite Awards	10 March 2026	Best Actor in a Motion Picture – Drama	Wagner Moura	Won	
Satellite Awards	10 March 2026	Best Motion Picture – International	The Secret Agent	Won	
Seattle Film Critics Society Awards	15 December 2025	Best International Feature	The Secret Agent	Nominated	
Sophia Awards	23 April 2026	Best Ibero-American Film	The Secret Agent	Won	
Southeastern Film Critics Association	15 December 2025	Top 10 Films of 2025	The Secret Agent	10th place	
St. Louis Film Critics Association Awards	14 December 2025	Best Film	The Secret Agent	Nominated	
St. Louis Film Critics Association Awards	14 December 2025	Best Actor	Wagner Moura	Nominated	
St. Louis Film Critics Association Awards	14 December 2025	Best International Feature Film	The Secret Agent	Nominated	
Stockholm International Film Festival	14 November 2025	Bronze Horse	The Secret Agent	Nominated	
Stockholm International Film Festival	14 November 2025	Best Cinematography	Evgenia Alexandrova	Won	
Sur Awards	2 June 2026	Best Ibero-American Film	The Secret Agent	Won	
Sydney Film Festival	15 June 2025	Sydney Film Prize	The Secret Agent	Nominated	
Toronto Film Critics Awards	7 December 2025	Best Foreign Language Film	The Secret Agent	Runner-up	
Toronto Film Critics Awards	7 December 2025	Outstanding Lead Performance	Wagner Moura	Runner-up	
Vancouver Film Critics Circle	23 February 2026	Best International Film	The Secret Agent	Nominated	
Virginia Film Festival	26 October 2025	Craft Award Cinematography	Evgenia Alexandrova	Won	
Washington D.C. Area Film Critics Association	7 December 2025	Foreign Language Film	The Secret Agent	Nominated	
Zurich Film Festival	26 September 2025	Golden Eye Award for achievement in acting	Wagner Moura	Won	
