= Sutton House (Manhattan) =

Apartment building in Manhattan, New York

Coordinates: 40°45′18″N 73°57′52″W

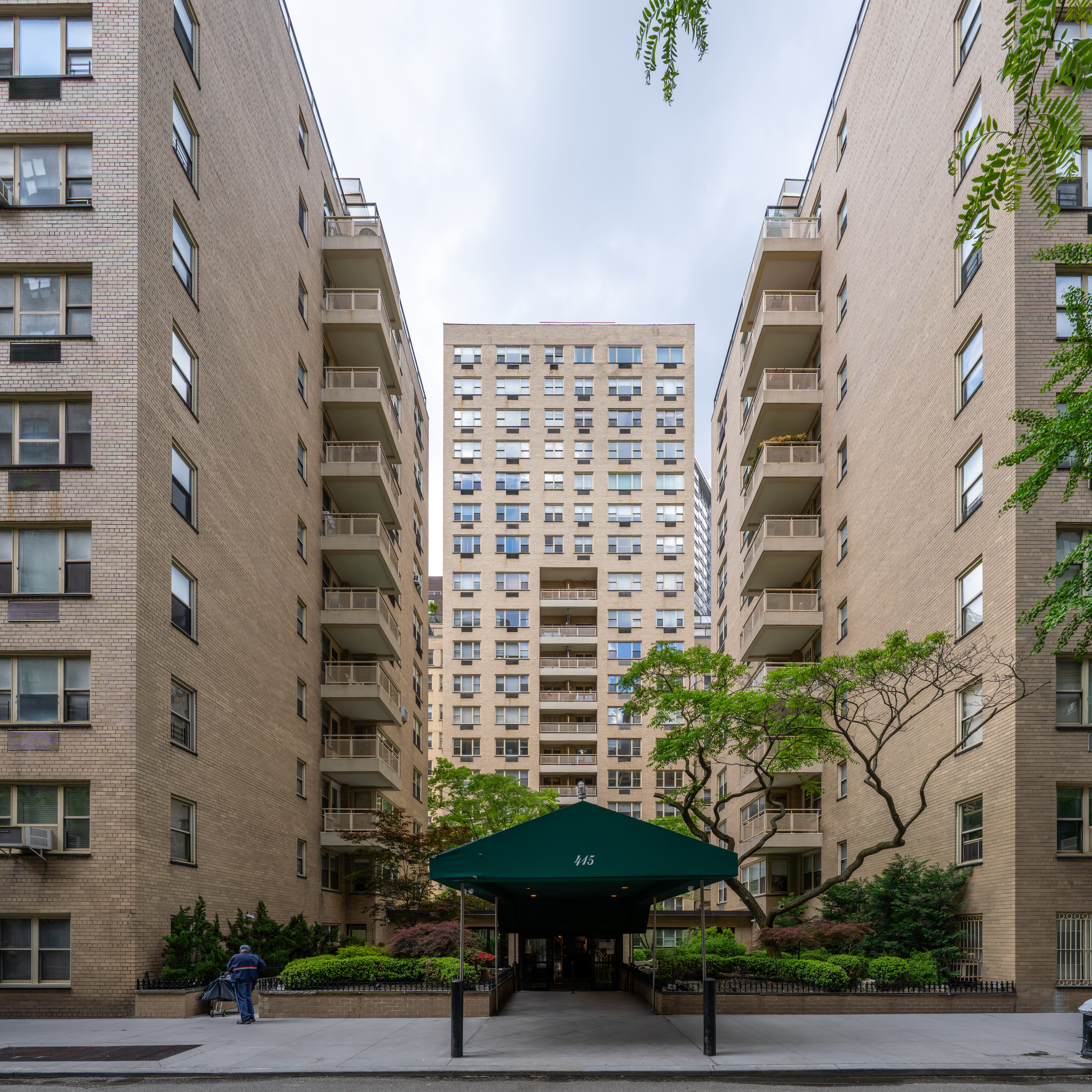
- Sutton House in 2026
- Interactive map of the Sutton House area

General information
- Type: Housing cooperative
- Architectural style: Modernist
- Location: 415 East 52nd Street, New York, NY, US
- Construction started: 1954
- Completed: 1956
- Inaugurated: February 1956

Technical details
- Floor count: 19 (building C) and 12 (A and B)
- Lifts/elevators: 7

Design and construction
- Architects: John M. Kokkins and Stephen C. Lyras
- Architecture firm: Kokkins & Lyras
- Main contractor: Kolyer Construction Corporation
- Awards: 1998 "New York's Top Ten Residences" by The Cooperator Magazine.

Other information
- Number of units: 289 (original)

Sutton House is a three-building residential cooperative complex located at 415 East 52nd Street in the Turtle Bay neighborhood of Manhattan in New York City. Designed by architects John M. Kokkins and Stephen C. Lyras and completed in 1956, the modernist white brick building consists of a 19-story tower facing 53rd Street and two 12-story wings facing 52nd Street. The complex is distinguished by its T-shaped glass-walled lobby and private interior gardens that connect the three structures.

Originally developed as a luxury rental property by a syndicate that included the architects and shipping magnate Manuel Kulukundis, Sutton House was converted to a cooperative in 1981. The building gained further prominence in 1998 when it was named one of "New York's Top Ten Residences" by The Cooperator magazine. Over the decades, it has been home to several high-profile residents, including actor Andy Griffith and the 67th U.S. Attorney General John N. Mitchell.

== Site ==
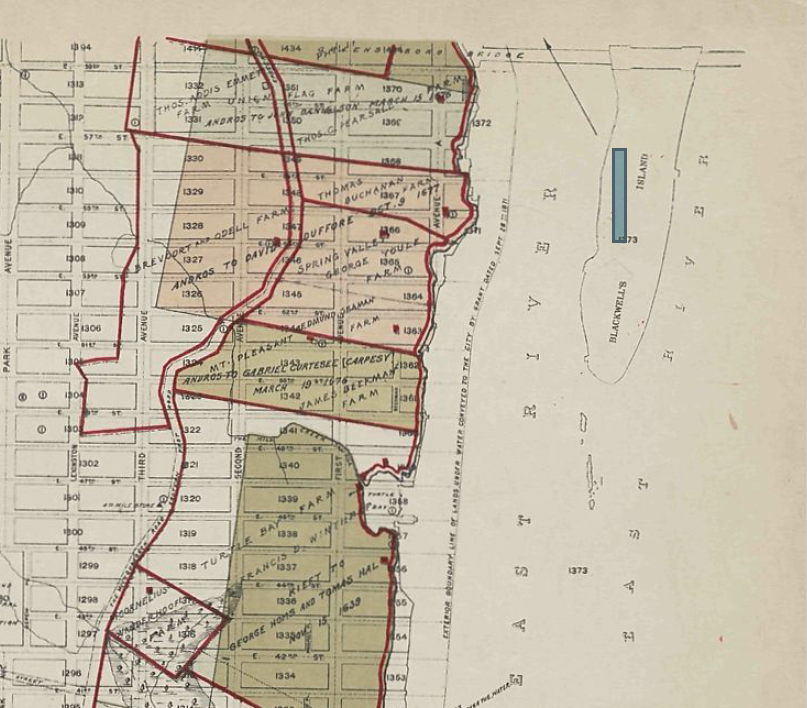
George Youle (Spring Valley) Farm and Edmund Seaman Farms split the current Sutton House block in 1815

Sutton House is located at 415 East 52nd Street on the Turtle Bay neighborhood of Manhattan in New York City. The 19-floor building C faces East 53rd Street, and is technically, therefore, part of the Sutton Place neighborhood, while the 12-floor buildings A and B face East 52nd Street.

As of 1815, the Sutton House area was farmland. According to The Iconography of Manhattan Island Volume 6, Block 1364, which is where Sutton House Lies, was split diagonally between the Edmund Seaman Farm and the George Youle Farm, also known as Spring Farm.

By 1879 a stoneyard had been developed and a planning mill had been erected where currently building C stands, facing E 53rd street, while townhouses faced 52nd st, in the area still owned by the descendants of Edmund Seaman. The 1891 map shows the planning mill replaced by a building owned by Consumers Ice Co, and the stoneyard still active, at the site of building C.

In 1930, the Sutton House site continued occupied by townhouses facing 52nd St, and by the Knickerbocker Ice Company ice house facing 53rd Street. Given that the Knickerbocker Ice company closed to the public in 1924, the area was not being used when construction started in 1954.

== Architecture ==
Sutton House was designed by John M. Kokkins and Stephen C. Lyras in the modern style and was built by Kolyer Construction Corporation, originally as a luxury rental building managed by Douglas Elliman. The 19-floor building C faces East 53rd Street while the 12-floor buildings A and B face East 52nd Street. Sutton House was developed to be a "Symbol of town Living for Perfectionists", per its marketing brochure found at Columbia University New York Real Estate Brochure Collection.

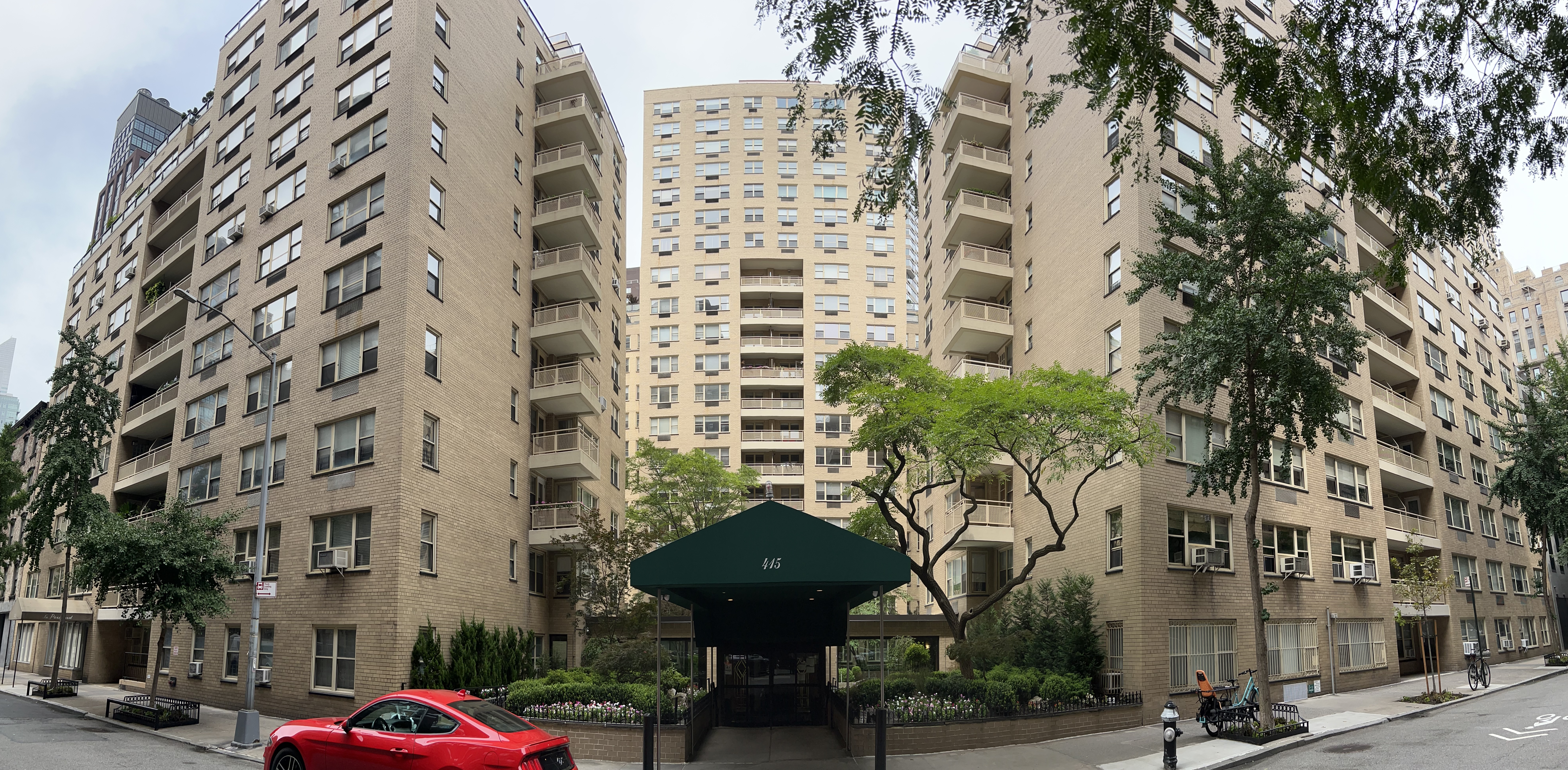
Sutton House Panorama, 52nd Street Entrance, building A on the left, C on the back, B on the right

=== Form ===
The three buildings are connected by a T-shaped glass-walled lobby, approached through a landscaped entrance, facing 52nd St on the south. Open areas between the buildings are private park-like settings. The complex features a two-story 160-car garage facing 53rd street, for easy access from FDR Drive, and totals 290 apartments, from suites to 5-bedroom penthouses. Most of the apartments feature balconies, and some include fireplaces. Sutton House is a white brick building designed in the modernist period, a style shared with the contemporaneous Manhattan House, which regained popularity in the 2010s.

According to the New York Times in 1956, "the term "landscaping", rather than "decorating", has been used to describe the plans for the lobby and ground floor corridors of the Sutton House". The public space design was done by Virginia Conner Dick, a prominent interior designer and a furniture designer hired by Kokkins & Lyras for the job. According to the Times, "The indoor-outdoor effect of the lobby and the glass-enclosed corridors connecting the building's three sections are achieved with large plantings near the large windows facing the private garden".

=== Façade ===
The facade is made of white bricks. Sutton House was one of many buildings designed by Kokkins & Lyras using white bricks in their exterior between 1956 and 1959. The building entrance is at 415 E 52nd St, with the restaurant space at 405 E 52nd St, and two offices also open towards E 52nd St. The building service entrance is at 420 E 53rd Street, with the Sutton House Garage entrance to the east. The building was built with air conditioner outlets on every room, and window space for air conditioners, so they could be at the center of the room. The building is going through a conversion from window air-conditioners to PTACs, as can be seen on the images. Balconies are present at most apartments, and terraces on the top floors of all three buildings. Buildings A and B have 2 elevators each, one reaching the basement, while the larger building C has 3 elevators, one reaching the basement and the lower basement towards the garage.

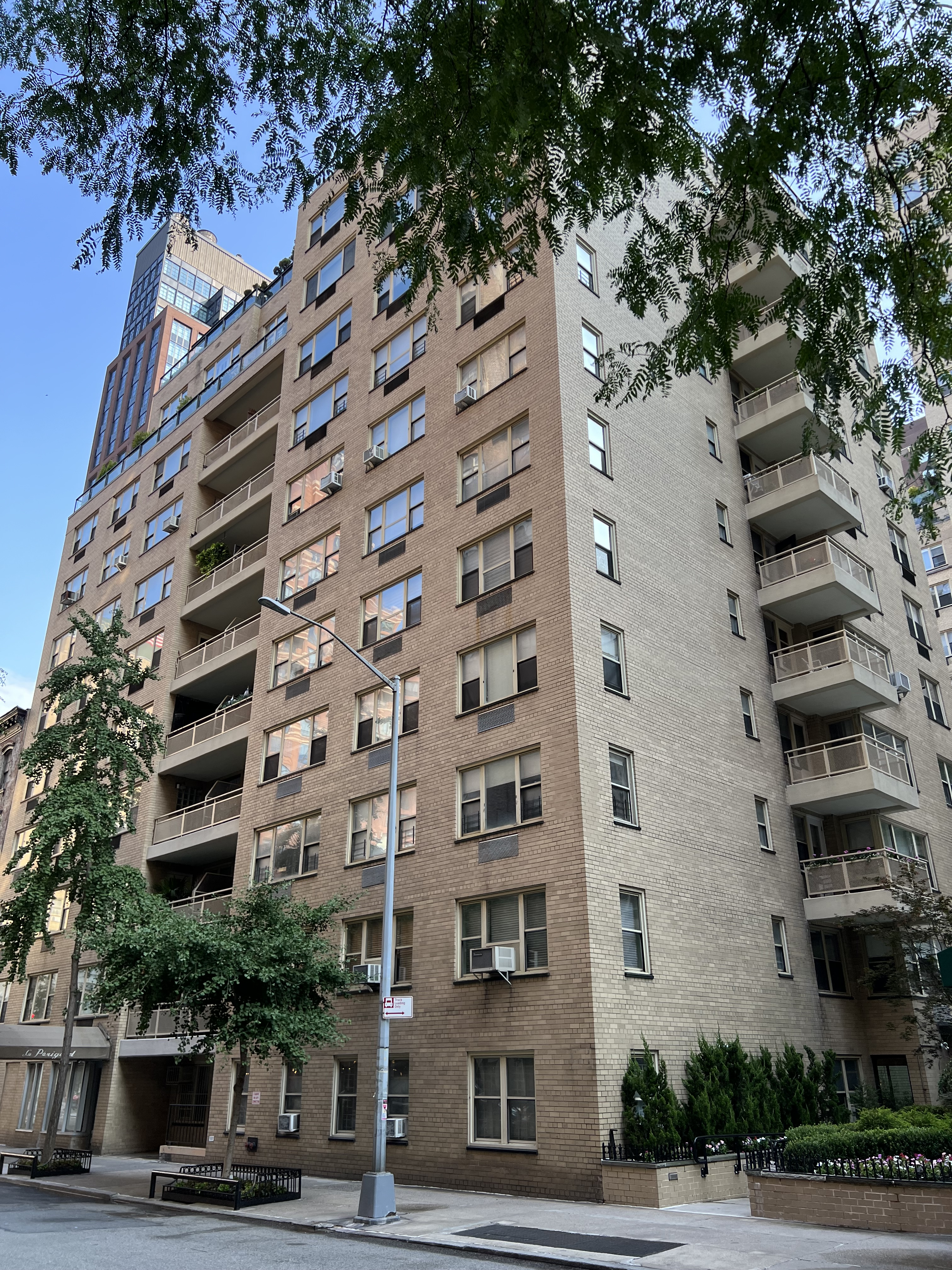
Sutton House Building A

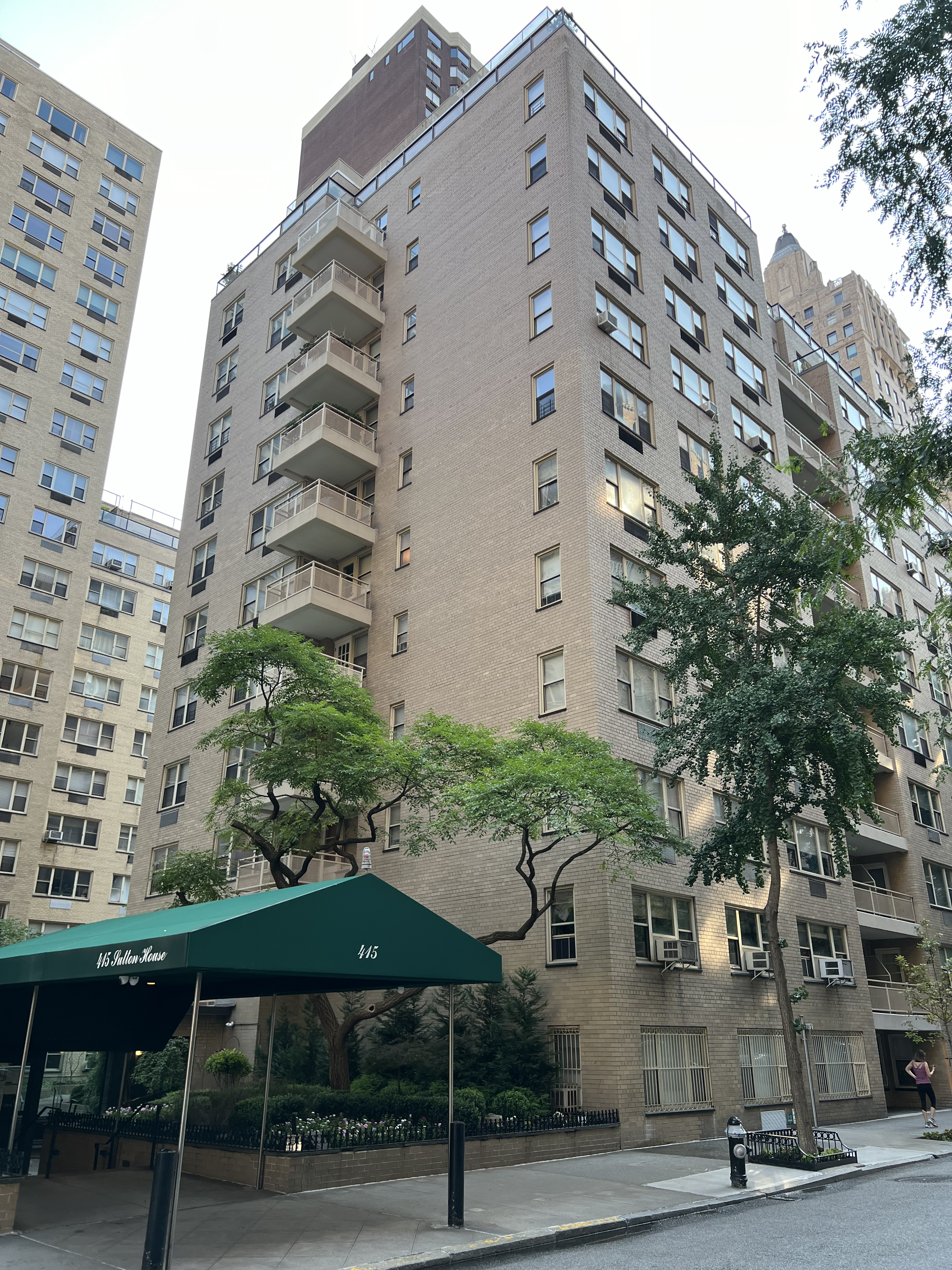
Sutton House Building B

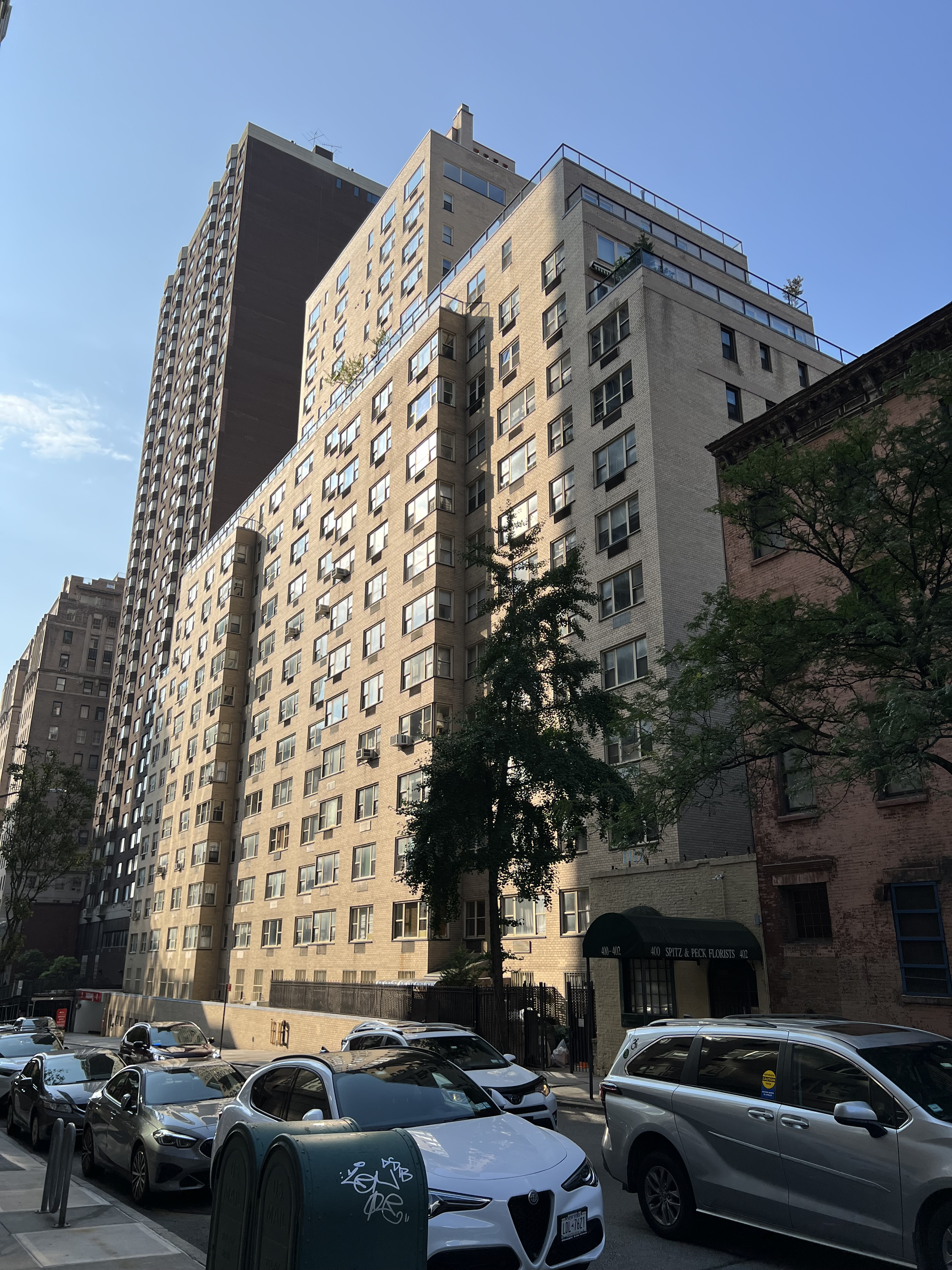
Sutton House Building C

=== Apartments (original floor plan) ===
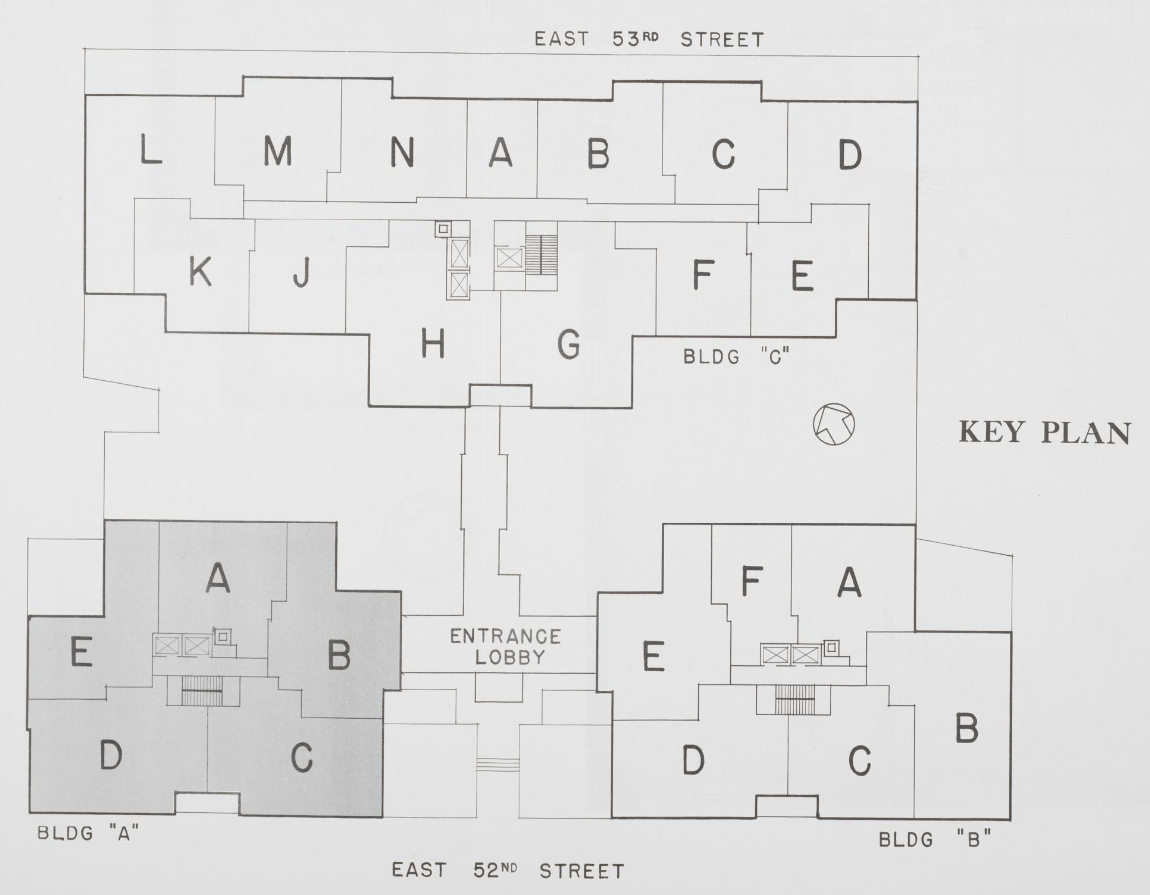
Sutton House Original Building Plan

==== Building A ====
Building A has five apartments per floor, A through E, on floors 2 to 9, where apartments B, C and D have balconies. Floors 10 and 11 have four apartments, including a terrace on the 10th floor for apartment D. The twelfth floor, the penthouse floor, has three apartments, all with terraces.

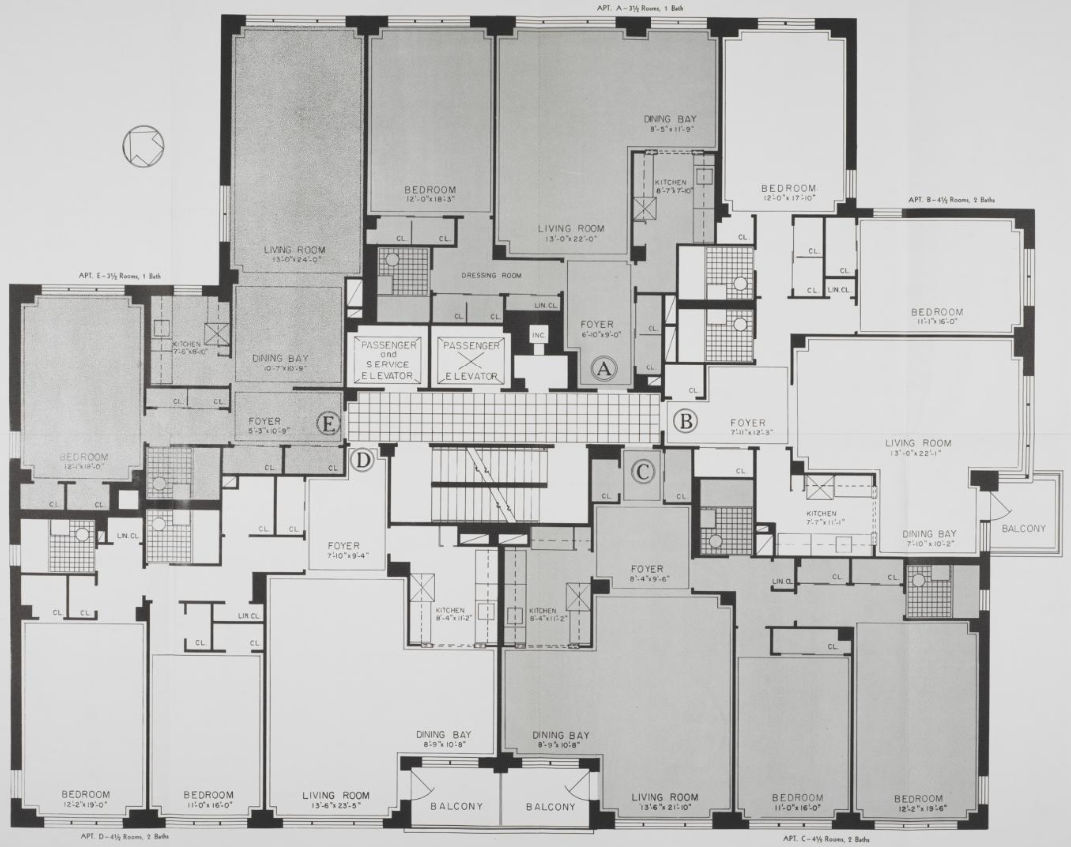
Floors 2 to 9

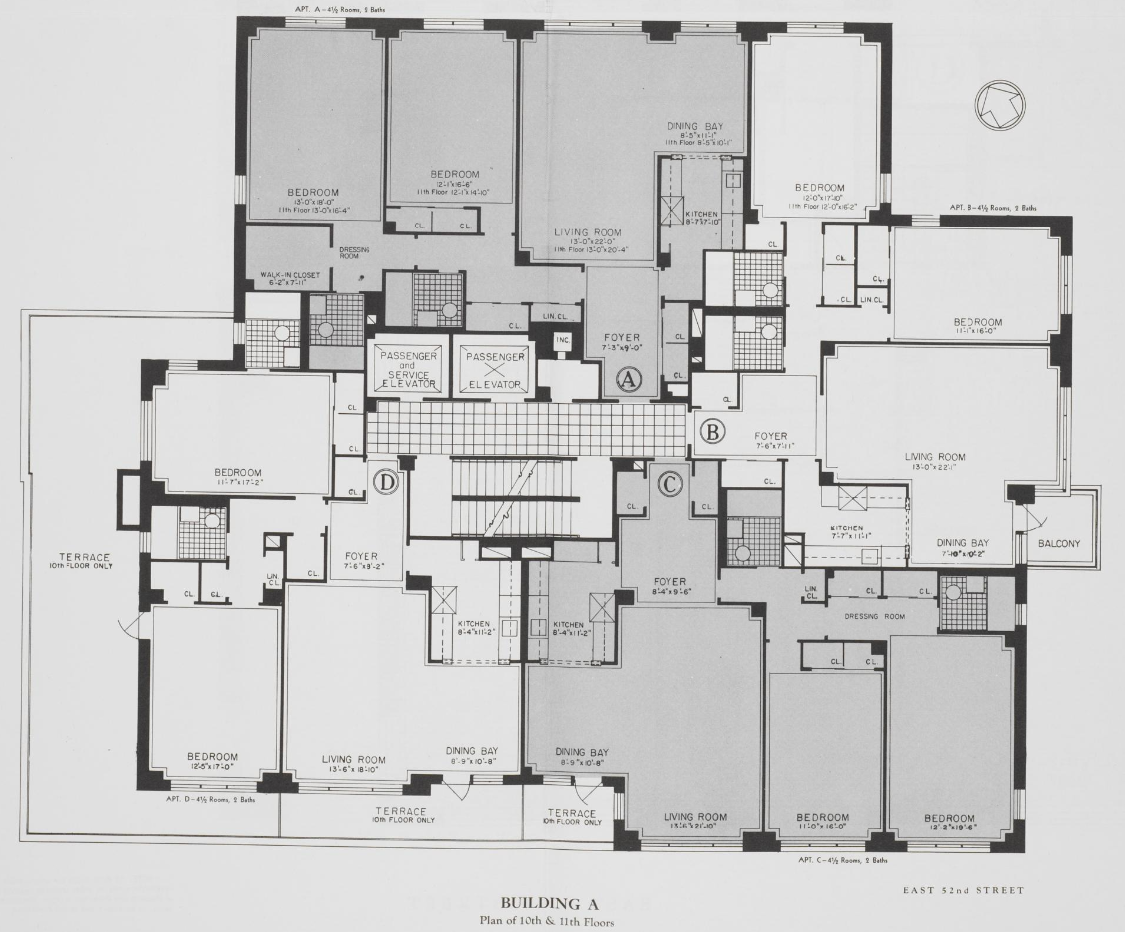
Floors 10 and 11

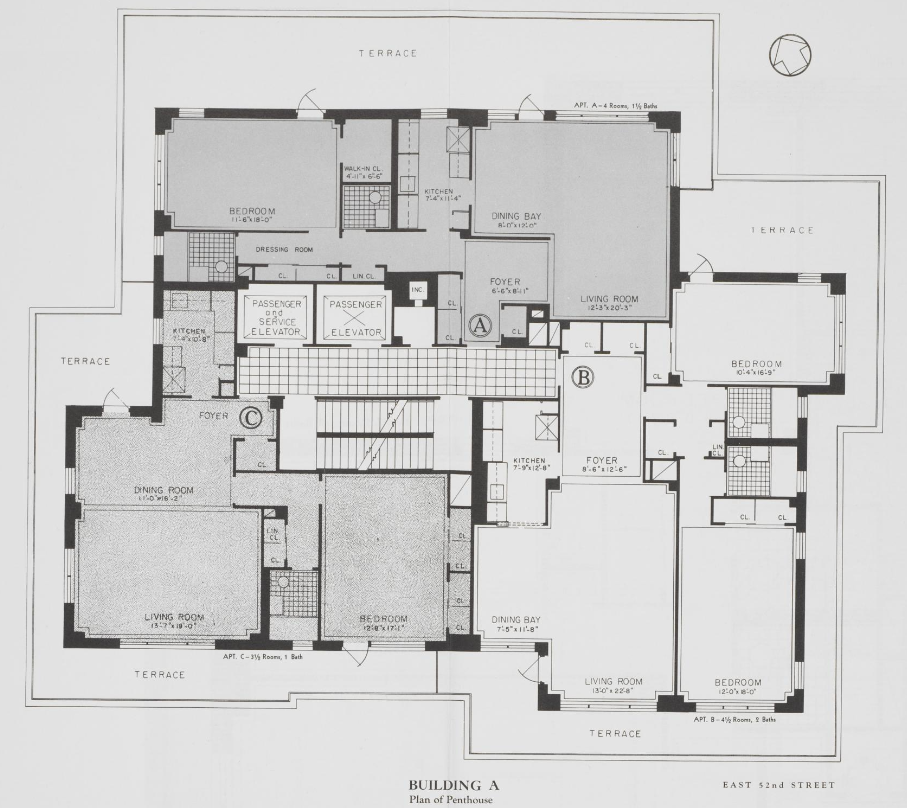
12th floor penthouse

==== Building B ====
Building B has six apartments per floor, A through F, on floors 1 to 9. The first-floor apartments are connected to the main lobby through a lounge with windows toward the B–C garden. On floors 2 to 9 apartments C, D and E have balconies. Floors 10 and 11 have five apartments, with balconies in apartments B, C and D. Apartments A and B on the 10th floor have terraces. The twelfth floor, the penthouse floor, has three apartments, all with terraces.

1st Floor

Floors 2 to 9

Floors 10 and 11

12th floor penthouse

==== Building C ====
Building C has thirteen apartments per floor, A–G and H–N, on floors 1–9. The first-floor apartments are connected to the main lobby through a corridor with windows on both sides, defining the border of the A–C and B–C gardens. On floors 2–9 apartments G and H have balconies. Floors 10 and 11 have twelve apartments, with balconies on apartments G, and H. Apartments D, E, K and L on the 10th floor have terraces. The penthouse floor on floor twelve has nine apartments. Apartments E and F have balconies. All apartments other than A on this floor have terraces. Building C tower, floors 13 to 19, has three apartments per floor. On the thirteenth floor, all apartments have terraces.

1st Floor

Floors 2 to 9 (left side)

Floors 2 to 9 (right side)

Floors 10 and 11

12th floor penthouse

Floors 13 to 19

=== Lobby and amenity spaces ===
The ground level has a lobby connecting the three buildings, each with a different sub-lobby. The garage was built to support 160 vehicles at 53rd Street. The garage continues to operate. Sutton House Lobby contains windows facing the internal and external gardens, and features floor to ceiling mirrors. Sutton House has a kid's playroom, a modern gym/health center, bicycle storage, and three East River-viewing rooftop decks.

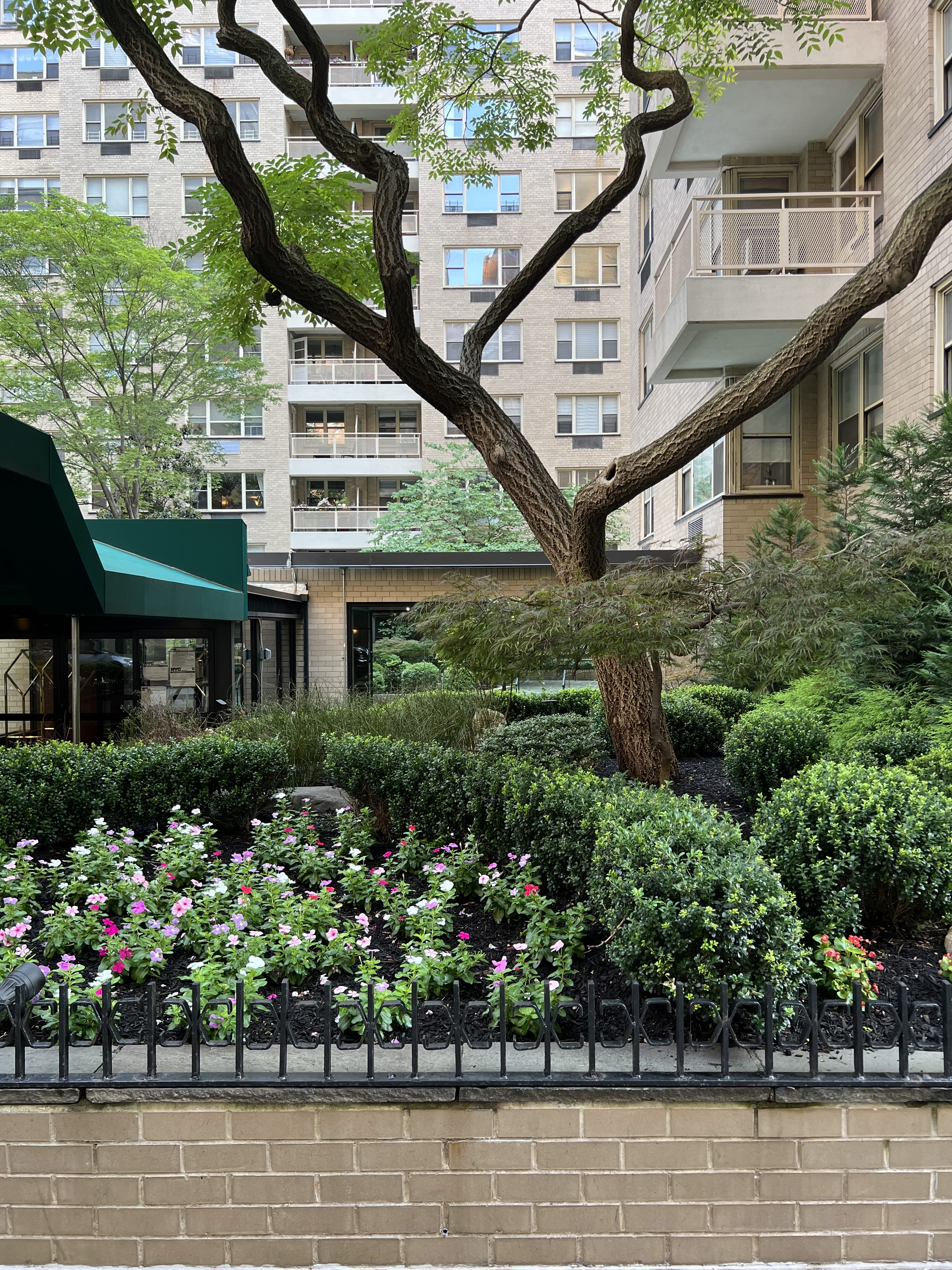
Sutton House entrance garden

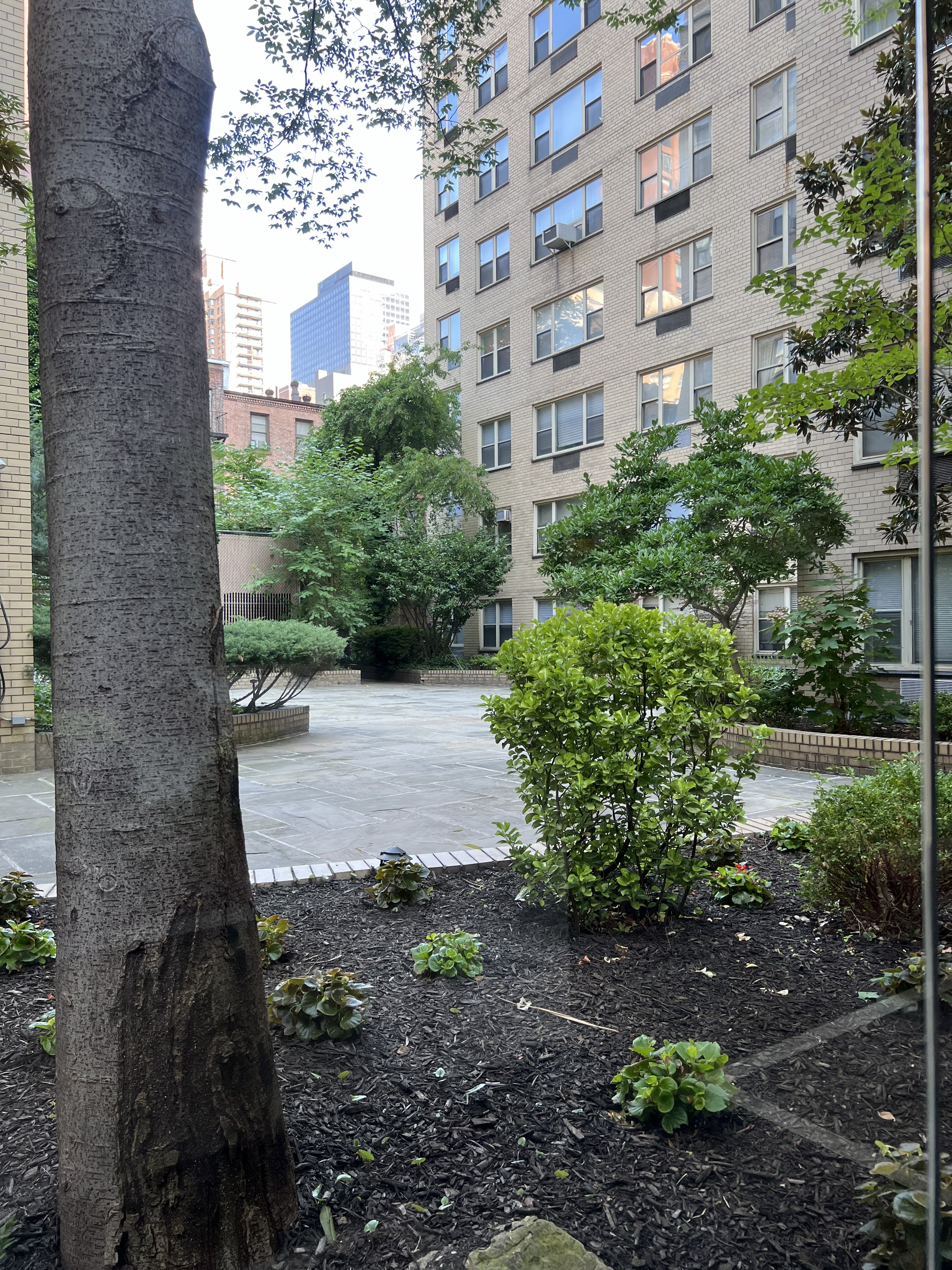
Sutton House garden between buildings A and C

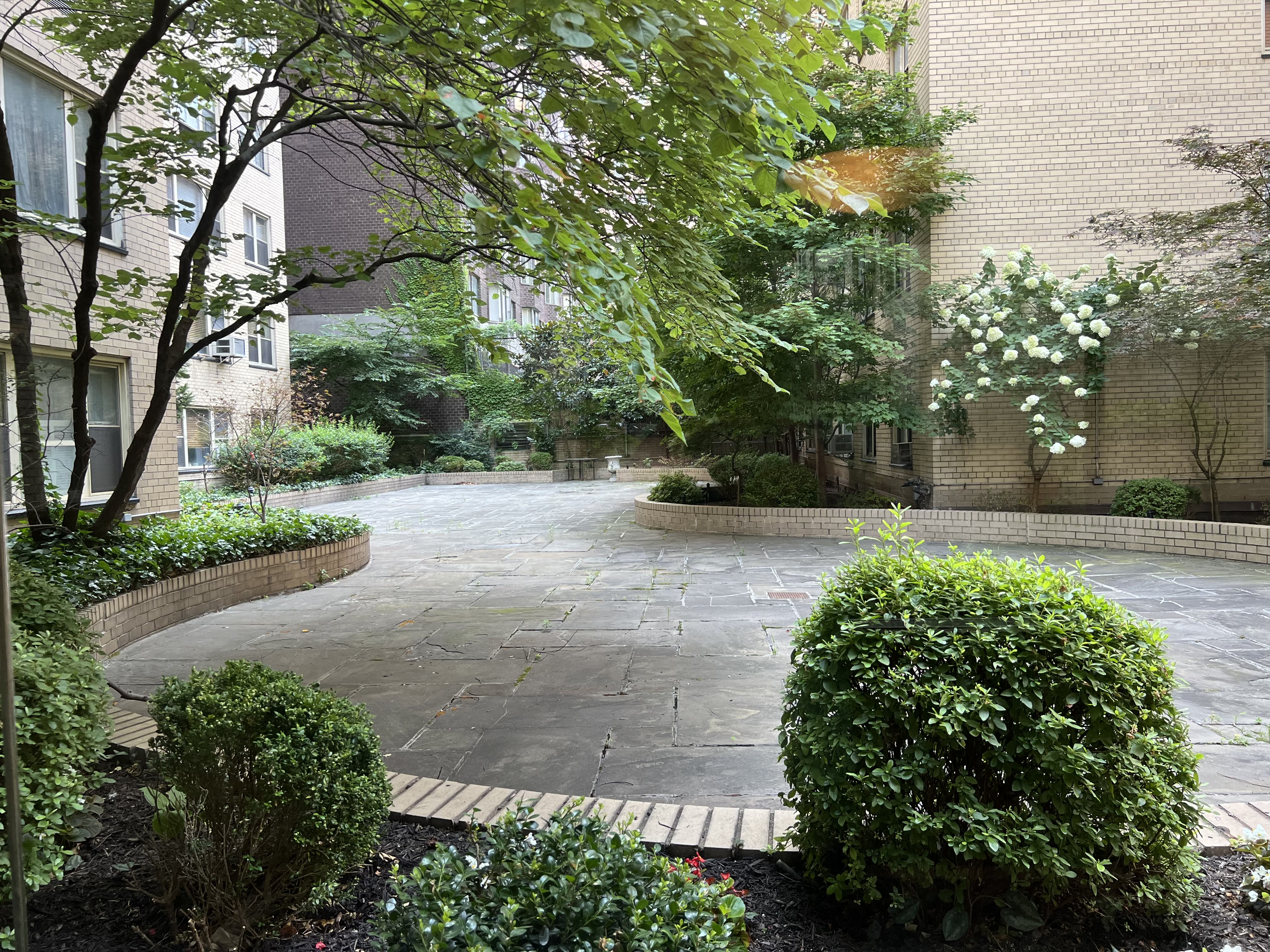
Sutton House garden between buildings B and C

=== Rooftop facilities ===
In the mid-1990s, Sutton House opened its rooftop areas to residents following a tenant survey that favored a simple, low-maintenance layout. The resulting design emphasized unobtrusive seating areas rather than landscaped plantings, reflecting resident preferences for a clean and easy-to-maintain communal space. Access to these shared rooftop areas was also noted as a desirable amenity within the building.

=== Restaurant ===
The French restaurant Le Périgord, owned by Georges Briguet, operated at Sutton House from 1964 until 2017. After Le Périgord closed, Briguet had planned to open a new restaurant at the same location, but the space remained vacant until his death in 2022.

Italian restaurant Nino's, owned by Nino Selimaj, took its place at 405 East 52nd Street in December 2025. Previously located at 1354 First Avenue on the Upper East Side, the 35-year-old restaurant relocated because its former space was slated to be demolished to make way for a 23-story building.

== History ==
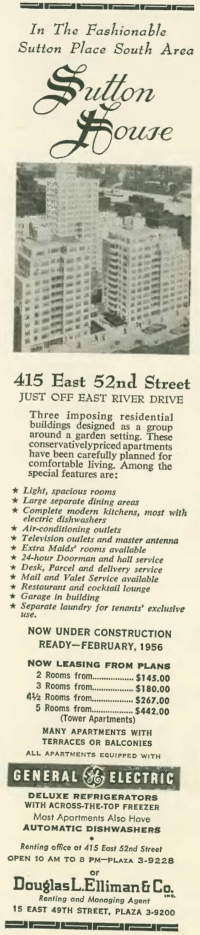
Sep-1955 Sutton House ad

=== Development and initial rentals ===
In 1954, a syndicate of seven investors—including architects John M. Kokkins and Stephen C. Lyras, and Greek shipping executive Manuel Kulukundis—acquired the parcels necessary to construct Sutton House. Construction took place between 1955 and 1956 under the Kolyer Construction Corporation, with an estimated project cost of $4,000,000.

Marketing for the building targeted "perfectionists", positioning the complex as a "Symbol of town Living". Upon opening, the building was managed as a luxury rental by Douglas Elliman. Early rental records from late 1955 show a higher demand for two- and three-room apartments compared to the larger tower penthouses, with initial monthly rents starting as low as $145.

=== Ownership transitions and "The Coin Flip" ===
The building's ownership became increasingly complex in the 1960s and 70s. In November 1964, Chatham Associates—a front for real estate investors Sol Goldman and Alex DiLorenzo Jr.—purchased a 76% interest in the building from the then-bankrupt Kulukundis. Following DiLorenzo's death in 1975, Goldman and Alex DiLorenzo III famously divided their joint real estate empire via a coin flip; however, disputes over the valuation of Sutton House led to the property being sold in its entirety to Michael Kulukundis in June 1979 for over $7 million.

During this period, the building briefly appeared in federal investigations involving Anthony Scotto, a labor union leader and member of the Gambino crime family. In 1979, trial testimony revealed that Kulukundis had sold a 13% interest in the corporation owning Sutton House to Scotto for a nominal sum of $26, despite that portion's multi-million dollar valuation. Scotto divested his interest in the corporation later that year.

=== Cooperative conversion ===
Due to the financial and legal pressures facing the sponsors, an initial offering plan to convert the building into a housing cooperative was submitted in January 1980. The conversion was finalized in 1981. Under the "insider" offering plan, existing tenants could purchase shares at $97.50 per share. This allowed for the purchase of a 1,250-square-foot, two-bedroom apartment for approximately $90,187, a price significantly below the market average of $265,000 to $550,000 for similar units in the Sutton Place area at that time.

== Notable tenants ==
- Alex DiLorenzo III, son of Alex DiLorenzo Jr and partner of Sol Goldman, lived in the building in the 1970s
- Aline Meyer Liebman, artist
- Andy Griffith, American actor, comedian, television producer, singer, and writer, in 1959.
- Clyde Curlee Trees, in 1959, co-founder of the Society of Medalists
- Dorothy Bell Lawrence, a member of the New York State Assembly (New York Co., 8th D.) from 1959 to 1963
- Edward B. Watson, as of 1976.
- Edward Eager, American lyricist, dramatist and writer of children's fiction
- Georges Briguet, who ran the Le Périgord restaurant at Sutton House, among other restaurants in NYC, and lived in the building from 1964 until his death in 2022
- Herb Grosch, early computer scientist, in 1960.
- Herb Schapiro, co‑creator and co‑lyricist of The Me Nobody Knows, in 1977.
- John N. Mitchell, 67th attorney general of the United States.
- Lester Merkin, Jazz saxophone player, later into numismatic, in 1964.
- Real Admiral Paulus Prince Powell, as of 1960.
- N. Hashem, Egyptian physician and scientist.
- Ralph G. Gulley, architect, founder and first dean of the School of Architecture at Rensselaer Polytechnic Institute.
- Ray Josephs, American journalist, author, and international public relations consultant.
- Richard C. Casey, United States district judge for the Southern District of New York, lived in apartment 12HC from 2006 until his death

== In fiction ==
Sutton House is mentioned in the following fictional works:

- Cahoots: A Comedy in Two Acts
- Rosa Ponselle: American Diva
- Duffy's War: Fr. Francis Duffy, Wild Bill Donovan, and the Irish Fighting

== Critical reception ==
The interior design magazine featured a model apartment of Sutton House in its August 1956 edition.

In 1998, Sutton House was picked as one of "New York's Top Ten Residences" by The Cooperator magazine, alongside 1185 Park Avenue, 300 East 74th Street, The Ardsley, The Boulevard, Castle Village, The Chateau, Hudson Tower Condominium, Kensington Lofts, and The Oxford. Sutton House was hailed for its three rooftop decks with views of the East River, its glass-enclosed lobby designed with marble floors and wood paneling, overlooking the gardens in front of the building and the courtyard in the center of the complex. Its glass-enclosed walkway from the lobby to the center building, behind the courtyard, was also praised, as well as its health club, on-site garage, basement storage, package room and a 24-hour doorman and concierge. The building was also praised for having apartments featuring European kitchens, hardwood floors, washers and dryers, marble bathrooms and lots of closets, also for many units with balconies or terraces with East River views.

In 1998, the reserve fund was over $1 million with a long-term resident and board member saying maintenance costs were kept low by not doing everything at once.
