= White brick building =

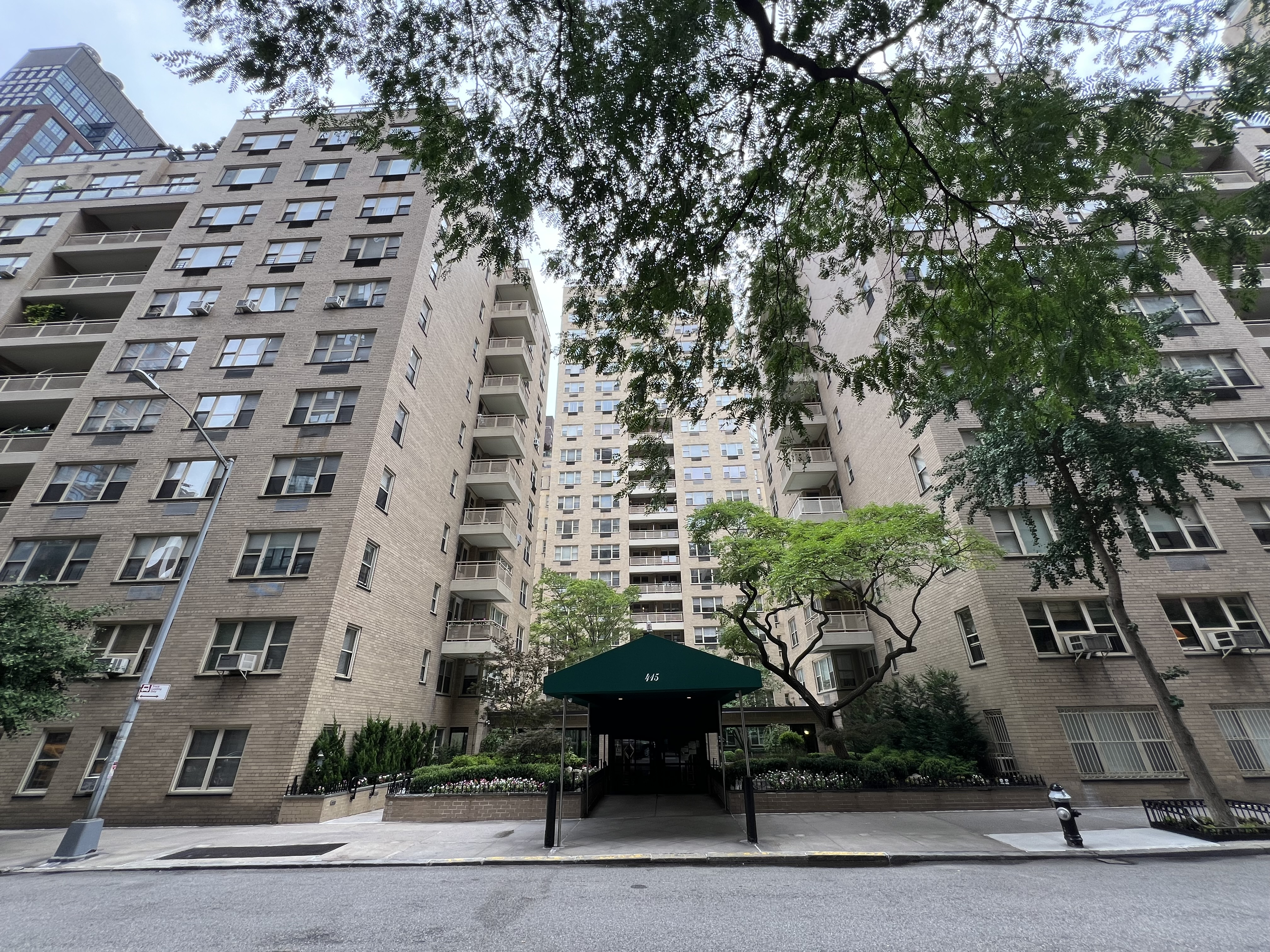
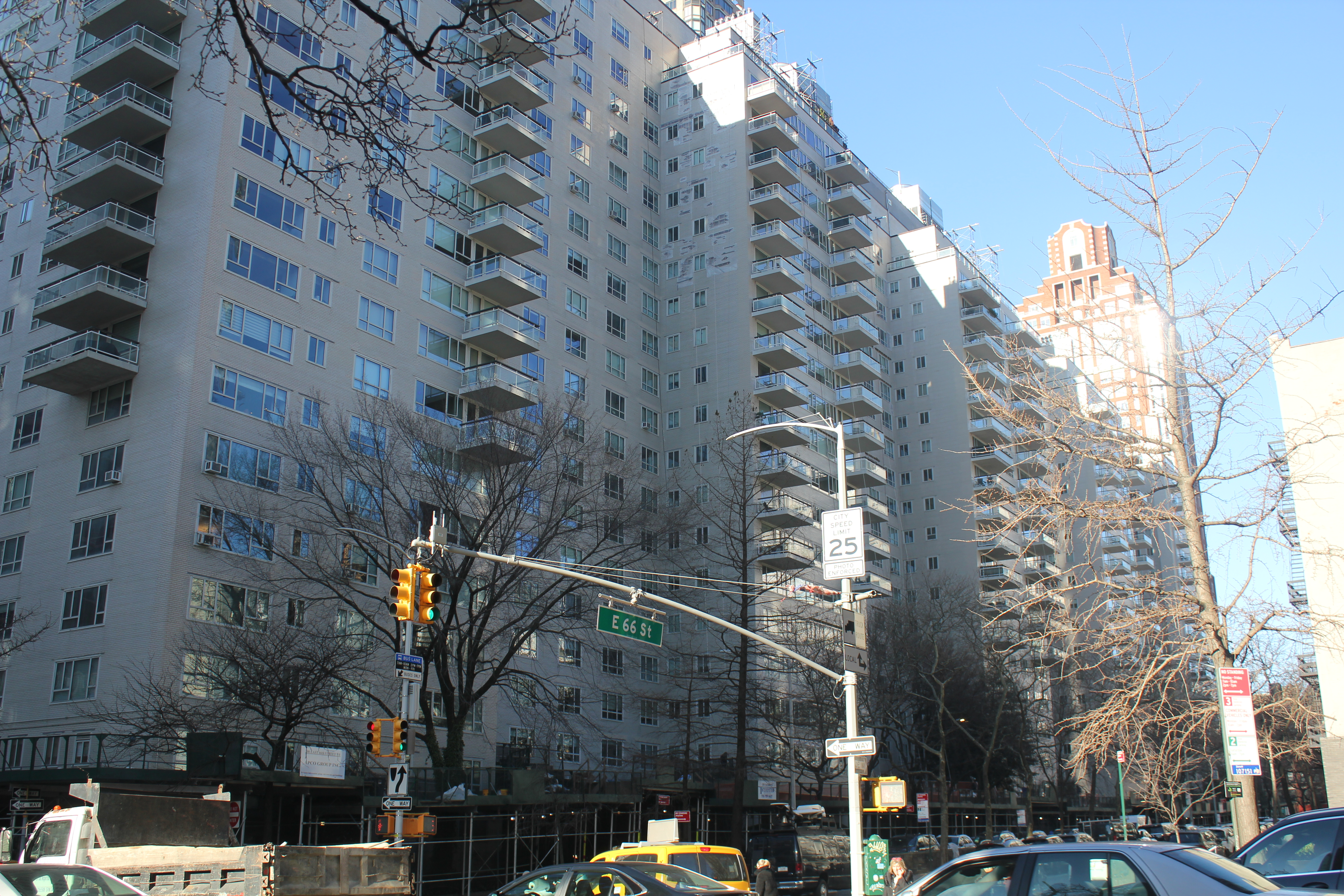
- From left to right: Sutton House, by Kokkins and Lyras (1956); Manhattan House, by Bunshaft, Mayer and Whittlesey (1951)
- Years active: 1950s–1970s
- Location: New York City
- Major figures: Gordon Bunshaft, Albert Mayer, Julian Whittlesey, John M. Kokkins and Stephen C. Lyras

White brick buildings became common in New York City during the 1950s (and are therefore considered to be part of the modernist movement), even though they were not totally unknown to the city before that, as the 1907 Plaza Hotel shows. That said, between the 1950s and 1970s, around 140 white brick apartments were built in the city, defining a lot of its post-war character. Since 2008, white brick buildings became recognized as an important element in New York, with the requirement of the first landmark restoration of such as building: the 1960 co-op at 900 Fifth Avenue. As white brick buildings age, they are considered to require higher maintenance than other construction styles.

== Select New York City White Brick Buildings in chronological order ==
- 1901 925 Fifth Avenue
- 1905 285 Central Park West
- 1907 Plaza Hotel
- 1918 2 West 67th Street
- 1919 910 Fifth Avenue
- 1925 239 Central Park West
- 1926 995 Fifth Avenue
- 1926 30 East 72nd St
- 1927 262 Central Park West
- 1929 91 Central Park West
- 1929 The Beresford
- 1930 The San Remo
- 1931 275 Central Park West
- 1932 The Eldorado
- 1938 955 Fifth Avenue
- 1939 900 Madison Ave
- 1940 295 Central Park West
- 1940 936 Fifth Avenue
- 1948 945 Fifth Avenue
- 1950 923 Fifth Avenue
- 1951 Manhattan House
- 1952 2 Fifth Avenue
- 1955 Westminster House
- 1955 930 Fifth Avenue
- 1956 Sutton House
- 1957 165 East 66th Street
- 1959 179 East 70th Street
- 1960 900 Fifth Avenue
- 1960 The Victorian
- 1961 Imperial House
- 1961 The Grace
- 1961 150 West End Avenue
- 1961 Townsend House
- 1961 201 East 66th
- 1962 The Renoir
- 1962 Lincoln Terrace
- 1962 200 East 74th
- 1963 301 East 69th Street
- 1963 The Pavillion
- 1967 The Excelsior
- 1968 80 Central Park West
- 1969 985 Fifth Avenue
- 1978 The Concorde
