= Stephen C. Lyras =

American architect (1913 – 1983)

- Born: Stephen C. Lyras; 24 April 1913; Philadelphia, USA
- Died: 25 November 1983 (aged 70)
- Occupation: Architect
- Known for: Architecting The Pentagon, Sutton House and Carlton-Regency

Stephen C. Lyras (24 April 1913 – 25 November 1983) was an American architect.

Lyras was born in Philadelphia. He was educated at New York University and trained as an architect at the University of Pennsylvania graduating in 1938.

Lyras was among the team of architects the designed The Pentagon, and designed more than 50 buildings, including Sutton House and hospitals in post World War II Greece jointly with John M. Kokkins.

== Notable buildings ==
=== With John M. Kokkins ===
- Sutton House, white brick building, 1956
- 165 East 66th Street, white brick building, 1957
- 179 East 70th Street, white brick building, 1959
- Inwood Heights 1705 Fort George Hill, 1961
- 16 Sutton Place, 1967
- Belcourt Gardens 213 St and 36th Ave
