= Le Périgord =

French restaurant in Manhattan, New York (1964–2017)

- Interactive map of Le Périgord

Restaurant information
- Established: April 1, 1964
- Closed: March 11, 2017
- Previous owner: Georges Briguet
- Location: 405 East 52nd Street, New York, New York, United States
- Coordinates: 40°45′18″N 73°57′53″W
- Seating capacity: 115 seats

Le Périgord was a French restaurant in the Turtle Bay neighborhood of Manhattan in New York City from 1964 to 2017. Located at 405 East 52nd Street in the base of the Sutton House, the restaurant was owned by Georges Briguet throughout its entire existence.

== History ==
The restaurant opened on April 1, 1964, after Georges Briguet bought the restaurant La Provence and renamed it "Le Périgord". The first chef was Ferdinand Desbans, who had been the chef at La Provence and had previously worked at Cafe Chambord and as the chef to Prince Louis II of Monaco; Desbans hailed from the region of France that was historically known as the Périgord.

Although there were over 20 authentic French restaurants operating in East Midtown at the time of Le Périgord's opening, the restaurant quickly began drawing attention after Richard Burton and Elizabeth Taylor were captured in a 1964 photo leaving the restaurant during their affair. In 1969, Le Périgord Park opened as a sister restaurant on Park Avenue at East 63rd Street, which served a similar menu; it closed in 1985.

Men dining at the restaurant were originally required to wear a jacket and tie. Briguet once turned away Truman Capote when he arrived without a tie, but allowed him to dine the following week when he arrived wearing a jacket, tie and Bermuda shorts, telling him "Monsieur, you have such beautiful legs. I wish people had such legs as you". By the late 1990s, Le Périgord was one of a handful of restaurants in New York City—including the 21 Club, the Carlyle, Le Cirque, La Côte Basque, La Grenouille and the Rainbow Room—that still required a tie. After the Great Recession, Briguet decided to separate the seating areas, sitting the fine dining clientele near each other and away from other diners that were not as formally dressed to avoid turning away business.

Le Périgord closed on March 11, 2017 as a result of Briguet failing to reach an agreement with Local 100 of the Hotel Employees and Restaurant Employees Union. With eight years remaining on the lease, Briguet had planned to rehire his former employees and reopen as a non-union restaurant called "Restaurant 405" at the same location about six months later, but the venue remained vacant until his death in 2022.

In addition to Desbans, other chefs who had worked at Le Périgord during its history included Joël Benjamin, David Bouley, Antoine Bouterin, Pascal Couduoy, Andre Gaillard, Thomas Keller, Willy Krause, Roger Lozak and Jacques Qualin.

== Reception ==
In 1966, restaurant critic Craig Claiborne from The New York Times gave Le Périgord two stars and called it "far and away the best French restaurant in the Beekman-Sutton area". Mimi Sheraton from the Times gave the restaurant one star in 1982, criticizing the service. Bryan Miller from the Times upped the restaurant's rating to three stars in 1989, complementing its service, which he said "performs with the precision of a trapeze troupe" and gave Le Périgord the same rating in 1992, noting that it "certainly knows its regular clientele as well as any establishment in town, and it cossets them with great style". Eight years later, William Grimes dropped the Times' rating back to two stars, mentioning how the restaurant's new chef moved the cuisine farther away from the Périgord region in southwestern France and critiqued the staff, but described Le Périgord as "a French restaurant the way French restaurants used to be, the way no one makes them anymore."
