= Jennifer Venditti =

American casting director

Jennifer Venditti is an American casting director, filmmaker, and author. She was nominated for the inaugural Best Casting Oscar at the 98th Academy Awards for her work on the film Marty Supreme.

== Early life ==
Venditti is from Saint Paul, Minnesota. She began her career in the fashion industry, working with various brands and W Magazine.

== Career ==
Venditti started casting for fashion brands, including Versace and Yohji Yamamoto. Her significant opportunity came when photographer Carter Smith asked her to cast a shoot for W Magazine, which she described as the beginning of her career in casting. In 1998, she founded her casting agency, JV8INC, based in New York City.

Venditti's first feature documentary, Billy The Kid, was released in 2007.

In 2014, actor and director Ryan Gosling hired Venditti for his directorial debut, Lost River. Gosling praised her ability to find individuals with rich characters, which was essential for the film.

Venditti's casting for American Honey (2016) involved scouting in locations like Walmart and dollar stores. Her approach aimed to find authentic individuals fitting the roles.

Venditti gained recognition for her casting work on the HBO series Euphoria. The diverse cast includes actors from various backgrounds, discovered through extensive searches on online platforms.

In 2019, she cast the crime thriller Uncut Gems, directed by the Safdie brothers.

In 2025, she cast the sports comedy-drama film Marty Supreme, directed by Josh Safdie. Venditti utilized both professional and non-professional actors in the film.

== Awards and nominations ==
Venditti received a nomination for a Primetime Emmy Award for Outstanding Casting for a Drama Series for her work on Euphoria in 2022. She also won the Best Television Pilot and First Season award at the 36th Artios Awards presented by the Casting Society of America in 2021.

Venditti's directorial debut with the documentary in 2007 entitled Billy The Kid won five awards, including Best Documentary at South by Southwest (SXSW) festival, Best Documentary at Edinburgh International Film Festival, Best Documentary Feature at Los Angeles Film Festival, Most Popular Documentary at Melbourne International Film Festival, and Outstanding Achievement in a Debut Feature Film at Cinema Eye Honors. She was also included on the 25 New Faces of Independent Film list in their 2007 annual survey of new talent.

Award	Year	Category	Work	Result	Ref.
Academy Awards	2026	Best Casting	Marty Supreme	Nominated	
Primetime Emmy Awards	2022	Outstanding Casting for a Drama Series	Euphoria (Season 2)	Nominated	
Artios Awards	2021	Best Television Pilot and First Season (Drama)	Euphoria	Won	
South by Southwest (SXSW)	2007	Best Documentary	Billy the Kid	Won	
Edinburgh International Film Festival	2007	Best Documentary	Billy the Kid	Won	
Los Angeles Film Festival	2007	Best Documentary Feature	Billy the Kid	Won	
Melbourne International Film Festival	2007	Most Popular Documentary	Billy the Kid	Won	
Cinema Eye Honors	2007	Outstanding Achievement in a Debut Feature Film	Billy the Kid	Won	

== Publications ==
In 2022, Venditti published her first book, Can I Ask You a Question?: The Art and Alchemy of Casting, under A24. The book received the American Institute of Graphic Arts 50 Books 50 Covers award.
