= Eddie Kulukundis =

British businessman (1932–2021)

Sir Eddie Kulukundis OBE
- Born: Elias George Kulukundis; 20 April 1932; London, England
- Died: 17 February 2021 (aged 88) near Bedford, England
- Occupations: Theatre impresario, shipping magnate, sport philanthropist
- Spouse: Susan Hampshire (m. 1981)
- Relatives: Cassandra Kulukundis (First cousin once removed)

Sir Elias George "Eddie" Kulukundis (20 April 1932 – 17 February 2021) was a Greek entrepreneur from a Greek shipping family. His professional career spanned shipping, the theatre, and athletics. He was married to British actress Susan Hampshire.

== Early life ==
Kulukundis was born at 26 Warbeck Street in London, the only child of George Kulukundis and Eugénie Diacakis. George was an heir to a Greek shipping family, founded by his father Manuel E. Kulukundis, who had made his home in England.

His parents moved to New York City when he was eight. He attended Salisbury School until 1950, and was an Emeritus Trustee of the school. He changed his name by deed poll to "Eddie" on 23 September 1993.

== Career ==
=== Shipping ===
The Kulukundis and Mavroleon families formed the shipping company Counties Ship Management in 1934 and its successor, London & Overseas Freighters (LOF), in 1948. Kulukundis entered the shipping industry by working on tramp steamers in the Mediterranean. After the death of his uncle John Kulukundis in September 1978, Kulukundis joined the LOF board. The company suffered mounting losses, and after it had sold all but two of its ships and all shoreside assets, he resigned on 11 December 1985.

He rejoined the board of the much-reduced company in 1988 following the death of company president Manuel Kulukundis, and also the death of his nephew, Minas Kulukundis, in the Lockerbie air disaster while flying to attend the funeral of his uncle and godfather Captain Nicholas Kulukundis.

On 1 November 1997, LOF was sold to Frontline Freighters AB of Sweden and Kulukundis resigned from the board. He continued to hold positions with the family company Rethymnis and Kulukundis Ltd, which celebrated its 150th anniversary in 1998.

=== Theatre ===
A theatre impresario, Kulukundis began producing plays while resident in the United States. He co-produced the 1976 Tony Award-winning play Travesties by Tom Stoppard. Kulukundis later formed Knightsbridge Productions, with theatre artist/educator Jack Lynn.

In 1993, Kulukundis was part of a consortium that took over the struggling Duke of York's Theatre on St Martin's Lane. The consortium became the Ambassador Theatre Group, of which Kulukundis was Life President and a major shareholder.

=== Athletics ===
In November 1998, Kulukundis came second in the contest to become the first elected president of UK Athletics to former Olympic champion David Hemery. Kulukundis served as chairman of the London Coaching Foundation, the Midland Coaching Foundation, and Athletes Youth Performance; vice-president of UK Athletics; chairman of the British Athletic Field Event Charitable Trust; and as chairman and patron of the Belgrave Harriers athletics club.

== Death ==
Kulukundis died at his home in SW London on 17 February 2021, aged 88.

== Philanthropy ==
Kulukundis gave more than £2 million to British athletes over 25 years. It was estimated that Kulukundis supported about 60 to 70 athletes.

The philanthropy started when he returned to the UK, after a chance meeting with David Hemery. Through Harry Wilson, Steve Ovett's coach, Kulukundis received the names of several athletes who needed help. Every deal was recorded by his secretary because, theoretically, each one was only a loan. Among the athletes Kulukundis has supported were:

- Nick Buckfield
- Linford Christie
- Sally Gunnell
- Denise Lewis
- Steve Ovett
- Fatima Whitbread
- Janine Whitlock
- Du'aine Ladejo
- Roger Black – "'When I was out of action for two years and earning nothing, it was Eddie who helped me with my mortgage."
- Dwain Chambers – who had to move out of home, so Kulukundis funded his flat
- David Jenkins – the disgraced 400m runner returned the $800 lent to him in 1978 when Kulukundis visited Indianapolis in 1998 for the US trials
- Dean Macey – Kulukundis provided Macey with an inexhaustible supply of free motor transport; Macey returned what remained of the car a few months later. On one occasion, the time lag between provision and destruction was no more than an afternoon. After three crashes, Macey gave up and Kulukundis funded his warm winter training instead.
- Eugene Gilkes "It was Eddie's support that made it possible for me to continue through the trials and tribulations of injury for long enough to hobble to a Commonwealth Decathlon medal. And so many of the good things in life that have happened since have been as a direct result of this achievement. I will always be grateful"
- Mo Farah - Kulukundis paid the legal costs of Farah's naturalization as a British citizen to ensure he could pursue his international career.
- Brendan Reilly - "Eddie opened my eyes to more than sport. Through his generosity and kindness I experienced theatre, travel, and developed lifelong friendships".

== Personal life ==
Kulukundis married the English actress Susan Hampshire in 1981. The couple lived in London, England. Active on stage and screen until her early seventies, Hampshire gave up most acting opportunities after 2009 to care for her husband, who had developed dementia and type 2 diabetes. His first cousin once removed was the American casting director Cassandra Kulukundis, though she refers to him as an uncle.

== Honours ==
Kulukundis was appointed Officer of the Order of the British Empire (OBE) for services to Sport in the 1988 Birthday Honours, and knighted for charitable services to Sport and to the Arts in the 1993 Birthday Honours.
