= Cassandra Kulukundis =

American casting director

- Occupation: Casting director
- Relatives: Manuel Kulukundis (grandfather); Eddie Kulukundis (first cousin once removed)

Cassandra Kulukundis (born 1971) is an American casting director. In 2026, for her work on the film One Battle After Another (2025), she became the first recipient of the Academy Award for Best Casting.

== Life and career ==
Kulukundis was born in 1971. She was born in the United States and is of Greek descent. She is the daughter of Manuel Michael Kulukundis, and the granddaughter of Manuel E. Kulukundis, both of the Kulukundis shipping family. Her first cousin once removed was entrepreneur and theater impresario Eddie Kulukundis.

She graduated from Vassar College in 1993. She began her career as an intern on director Paul Thomas Anderson's debut film Hard Eight (1996). In 2026 she won the first Academy Award for Best Casting for the film One Battle After Another (2025).

== Selected filmography ==
- Magnolia (1999)
- Ghost World (2001)
- Punch-Drunk Love (2002)
- Shattered Glass (2003)
- Spartan (2004)
- Jailbait (2004)
- Harold & Kumar Go to White Castle (2004)
- Haven (2004)
- Art School Confidential (2006)
- The Elephant King (2006)
- Breach (2007)
- There Will Be Blood (2007)
- The Master (2012)
- A Late Quartet (2012)
- Her (2013)
- Inherent Vice (2014)
- Phantom Thread (2017)
- Vox Lux (2018)
- Licorice Pizza (2021)
- Gossip Girl (2021–2023)
- The Greatest Hits (2024)
- The Brutalist (2024)
- One Battle After Another (2025)
