= Clyde Curlee Trees =

American medallic art businessman

- Born: March 27, 1885; Center, Howard County, Indiana, U.S.
- Died: October 2, 1960 (aged 75); New York City, U.S.
- Occupation: Businessman
- Known for: President of the Medallic Art Company; co‑founder of the Society of Medalists
- Awards: National Sculpture Society Medal of Honor

Clyde Curlee Trees (March 27, 1885 – October 2, 1960) was an American businessman known for his contributions to numismatics and coin collecting in the United States, and as the director of Medallic Art Company, which grew to prominence under his direction. The company produced medals for the government and private sectors, including presidential inauguration medals.

Trees was born on March 27, 1885, in Center, Howard County, Indiana. Trees joined the Medallic Art Company in 1919, and became its president in 1927. He bought the company from the two brothers who had founded it, Roiné and Felix Weil, in 1929.

In 1929, Trees co‑founded the Society of Medalists with philanthropist George Dupont Pratt. Modeled on European precedents and conceived as the successor to the Circle of Friends of the Medallion, the Society issued 139 medals over six decades and attracted many of the nation's foremost sculptors. During World War II, the Medallic Art Company produced millions of military service medals for the U.S. government, a period that made Trees a millionaire.

Trees died on October 2, 1960, in New York City.

== Honors ==
Trees received the National Sculpture Society's Medal of Honor for his promotion of medallic art in the United States.
