= Gabriel Domingues =

Brazilian casting director

- Education: Federal University of Rio de Janeiro
- Occupation: Casting director

Gabriel Domingues is a Brazilian casting director. At the 98th Academy Awards, he was nominated for the inaugural Academy Award for Achievement in Casting for the 2025 film The Secret Agent.

== Selected filmography ==
- The Secret Agent (2025)
