= Academy Award for Achievement in Casting =

Category of film award

Academy Award for Best Casting
- Country: United States
- Presented by: Academy of Motion Picture Arts and Sciences (AMPAS)
- First award: March 15, 2026 (for films released in 2025)
- Most recent winner: Cassandra Kulukundis; One Battle After Another (2025)
- Website: oscars.org

The Academy Award for Achievement in Casting, also known as Academy Award for Best Casting, is a film award presented by the Academy of Motion Picture Arts and Sciences as part of the Academy Awards.

After debuting in 2026, it brought the total number of competitive Oscar categories to 24.

== Background ==
The award was announced by the Academy in February 2024, to be presented for the first time at the 98th ceremony in 2026. It is the first new Oscar category introduced since Best Animated Feature Film in 2001. The nominees will be determined by the Casting Directors Branch within the Academy, which was established in 2013 and totaled nearly 160 members at the time of the award's announcement. A category to award achievement in casting had previously been rejected by the Academy in 1999. Prior to the award's establishment, only one casting director, Lynn Stalmaster, had ever received an (honorary) Academy Award. Richard Hicks, governor of the casting director's branch, exclaimed that "we're finally at the moment where casting is recognized as a craft alongside all the others...It's something the casting community has been hoping for 30 years."

== History ==
Casting directors have long advocated for recognition at the Oscars, with efforts dating back to the late 1990s. A similar proposal was considered and rejected in 1999. In the 2012 documentary Casting By, about Marion Dougherty, many interviewees complained about the lack of an Oscar for her profession. The Academy created a dedicated Casting Directors Branch in July 2013, which played a key role in building support for the award.

On February 8, 2024, AMPAS announced the creation of the new category, stating: "Casting directors play an essential role in filmmaking, and as the Academy evolves, we are proud to add casting to the disciplines that we recognize and celebrate." Academy CEO Bill Kramer and President Janet Yang highlighted the milestone, while Casting Directors Branch governors Richard Hicks, Kim Taylor-Coleman, and Debra Zane praised it as acknowledgment of the branch's efforts.

== Winners and nominees ==
Year	Film	Nominees
2025 (98th)	One Battle After Another	Cassandra Kulukundis
2025 (98th)	Hamnet	Nina Gold
2025 (98th)	Marty Supreme	Jennifer Venditti
2025 (98th)	The Secret Agent	Gabriel Domingues
2025 (98th)	Sinners	Francine Maisler

== Shortlisted finalists ==
The five nominees for Best Casting are selected by the Casting Directors Branch. Branch members vote in order of their preference for not more than 10 pictures to be considered for the Casting award. Only the 10 motion pictures that receive the highest number of votes are eligible to be nominated.

Year	Finalists	Ref
2025	Frankenstein, Sentimental Value, Sirāt, Weapons, Wicked: For Good	

== See also ==
- List of Academy Awards ceremonies
- Casting Society of America
- BAFTA Award for Best Casting
