= Gáldar International Film Festival =

Annual film festival in Gáldar, Gran Canaria, Spain

- Location: Gáldar, Gran Canaria, Canary Islands, Spain
- Founded: 2013
- Founded by: Ayuntamiento de Gáldar
- Awards: Guayarminas de Bronce
- Language: Spanish, English
- Website: ficgaldar.es

The Gáldar International Film Festival, also known as abbreviated FIC Gáldar, is an annual film festival held in Gáldar, a municipality on the island of Gran Canaria in the Canary Islands, Spain. Organized by the Gáldar City Council through its Department of Culture since its inception in 2013, the festival focuses on showcasing national and international cinema, including feature films, short films, documentaries, and animations across various genres such as drama, comedy, horror, science fiction, and experimental works.

The event typically takes place in October and features competitive sections for short and feature films, a 48-hour express filmmaking contest called "Gáldar Rueda" workshops, masterclasses, and homages to industry figures. In recent years, it has gained recognition as a qualifier for the Goya Awards for short films, receiving submissions from over 30 countries and attracting prominent Spanish and international talent.

== History ==
The Gáldar International Film Festival was established in 2013 by the Ayuntamiento de Gáldar to promote cinema within and beyond the Canary Islands, foster emerging talent, and position Gáldar—home to the ancient prehispanic site of the Cueva Pintada Archaeological Park—as a cultural hub.

From its first edition, the festival has grown steadily, expanding its programming to include international competitions and parallel activities like exhibitions and street projections.By its 11th edition in 2023, it had become one of the most prominent film events in the Canary Islands, screening works from dozens of countries.

The 2024 edition (12th) received 650 submissions from 38 countries, featuring guests such as actress Candela Peña, who received the Guayarmina de Honor.

In 2025, marking its 13th edition themed "Ecos del Futuro" (Echoes of the Future), the festival premiered as a Goya Awards qualifier, attracting over 800 entries from 32 countries across five continents and emphasizing African cinema. The edition ran from October 18 to 25, 2025, with screenings at the renovated Centro Cultural Guaires and workshops for over 400 schoolchildren.

The festival has adapted to challenges like the COVID-19 pandemic by implementing health protocols and hybrid formats, ensuring its continuity as a live event.

== Program and sections ==
The festival's core is its Official Selection, open to feature films (over 60 minutes) and short films (under 30 minutes) in fiction, documentary, animation, and live-action formats, with no genre restrictions.

Key sections include:

Official Feature Film and Documentary Competition: International entries competing for the Best Feature Film award (€1,000 + Guayarmina de Bronce).

Official Short Film Competition: Divided into international, Spanish, and Canarian shorts; includes a Goya-qualifying Spanish short film section (10 films in 2025).

Gáldar Rueda: A 48-hour express short film contest where teams receive a theme (e.g., "All those moments will be lost in time, like tears in rain" in 2025) and film on location in Gáldar.The Darkest Hour: A non-competitive sidebar for fantasy and horror films.

Special Mentions: Awards for Best Director, Actor, Actress, Canarian Short (with one-year international distribution via Mailuki Films), and Landscape & Architecture in a Short Film (diploma).

Additional programming features masterclasses, Q&As, and homages, with the closing gala at the Polideportivo Juan Vega Mateos featuring a red carpet and live performances.

All screenings are free until capacity is reached.

== Awards ==
The festival's top honors are the Guayarminas de Bronce, bronze statuettes symbolizing the Guanche heritage of Gran Canaria. The jury, composed of three film industry professionals, makes final decisions, which are non-appealable.

The Guayarmina de Honor is a lifetime achievement award, presented annually to a prominent figure.

Categories and prizes (as of 2025) include: Best Feature Film or Documentary, Best Short Film, Best Director, Best Actor, Best Actress, Best Canarian Short, Gáldar Rueda Best Short, Gáldar Rueda Second Prize, Originality Special Mention and Best Interpretation.
