= Manuel Kulukundis =

Greek shipping magnate (1898–1988)

- Born: 12 November 1898; Greece
- Died: 9 August 1988 (aged 89); Southampton, L.I.
- Occupation: Bankrupt shipping magnate
- Known for: At its height in the 1950s, the Kulukundis shipping business controlled 25 United States-flagged vessels

Manuel Elias Kulukundis (1898–1988) was a Greek shipping magnate.

== Biography ==
The Kulukundis and Mavroleon families formed the shipping company Counties Ship Management in 1934 and its successor, London & Overseas Freighters (LOF), in 1948. During the 1950s, Kulukundis controlled 25 US-flagged vessels, and acquired the Bull Lines.

Kulukundis attracted controversy during the Korean War for refraining to carry cargo to communist countries, entering in an agreement with U.S. Senator Joseph R. McCarthy. His business was bankrupt by the mid-1960s.

== Legacy ==
Kulukundis is a member of the Greek Shipping Hall of Fame.

== Personal life ==
Kulukundis was married to the former Calliope Hadjilias, who died in 2006. They had two children, Manuel Michael and George. He was the grandfather of four, including Cassandra Kulukundis. His nephew Eddie Kulukundis served on the LOF board and later worked in theatre.
