= Isthmian Steamship Company =

- House flag
- Industry: Maritime
- Founded: 1910
- Headquarters: London, England and New York, USA
- Services: Sea transport

The Isthmian Steamship Company was a shipping company founded by US Steel in 1910.

Isthmian Steamship was the brainchild of US Steel President James A. Farrell, who had connections with the maritime industry through his father's trade as a ship's master. Farrell realized that US Steel could save substantial sums of money by owning its own fleet of freighters, rather than chartering cargo space from other companies. Farrell named the company after the Isthmus of Panama, in honour of America's recent construction achievement, the Panama Canal.

Farrell headquartered Isthmian Steamship in London, partly in order to take advantage of Great Britain's respected name in the industry, and partly to benefit from Britain's long history of maritime experience. Management of the company was assigned to the British Federal Steam Navigation Co Ltd, a company which traced its own origins back as far as 1782 with the British East India Company. The US end of Farrell's new company was managed by the Norton Lilly Agency.

== Early fleet ==
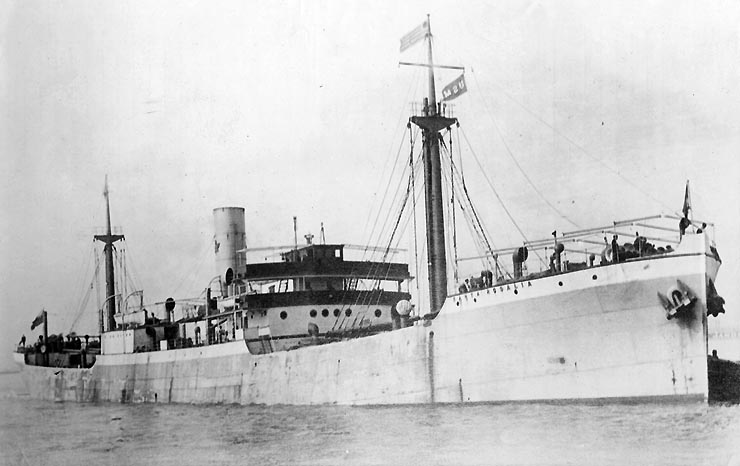
Santa Rosalia

The company's first ship was Bantu, a British steamship launched in 1902 and bought by US Steel from the Bucknall Line in 1910 for a reputed £24,000. In 1911 US Steel took delivery of its first newly-built ship, Santa Rosalia, from William Hamilton and Company in Port Glasgow, and bought second-hand the British tramp ship Kentra.

In 1913 Isthmian added Buenaventura, newly-built by the Northumberland Shipbuilding Company. She was joined in 1914 by another newly-built ship, San Francisco, from the North of Ireland Shipbuilding Company in Derry. Until the First World War broke out in 1914, all Isthmian ships remained registered in Britain.

Isthmian also bought second-hand the entire fleet of Charles G Dunn of Liverpool: Charlton Hall, Craster Hall and the twin-stacked cargo liner Crofton Hall all in 1914, followed by Howick Hall in 1915. With the outbreak of the First World War, Farrell re-registered all the company's ships in the then-neutral United States.

== Isthmian Steamship Company ==
On 30 January 1930 Isthmian Steamship Company was organized separately from US Steel which retained the ships Steel Chemist, Steel Electrician, Steelmotor, and Steelvendor. Isthmian Steamship Company acquired the ships:

- Anniston City (April)
- Crofton Hall (April)
- Mobile City (April)
- Steel Exporter (April)
- Atlanta City (May)
- Chattanooga City (May): Sunk by U-606 20 February 1943.
- Steel Seafarer (May): 1921–1943. Sunk by seaplane in 1943.
- Steel Traveler (May): 1922–1944. Sunk by mine in 1944.
- Steel Inventor (June): 1920–1954. Collided with (rammed) and sunk USS Woolsey in 1921.
- Steel Scientist (June): Operated as the transport ship Sea Owl 1944–1947.
- Steel Trader (June)
- Steel Voyager (June)
- Memphis City (July)
- Montgomery City (July)
- San Francisco (July)
- Steel Age (July)
- Steel Engineer (July)
- Steel Mariner (July)
- Tuscaloosa City (July)
- Bessemer City (August)
- Birmingham City (August)
- Ensley City (August)
- Knoxville City (August)
- Steelmaker (August)
- Chickasaw City (September)
- Fairfield City (September)
- Steel Ranger (September)
- Steel Worker (September)
- Selma City (October)

Sea Marlin was bought in 1947, renamed Steel Director, and operated until sold to the States Marine Lines in 1956, where she continued operating under the same name until scrapped in 1971.

The company would continue to expand its operations in the ensuing decades. In 1956 however, the by then highly lucrative company, then under retired Vice admiral Glenn B. Davis, was sold to States Marine Lines. US Steel justified the sale on the grounds that Isthmian's overall usefulness had diminished, as it now carried only a fraction of the corporation's exports.

It continued to operate as a property of States Marine until the early 1970s. Its last list of corporate officers is dated 1974.

== Other ships ==
- Sea Partridge: Renamed Steel Vendor (1943–1971)

== See also ==
- World War II United States Merchant Navy
