= USS Charlton Hall =

Cargo steamship that served in the US Navy in World War I

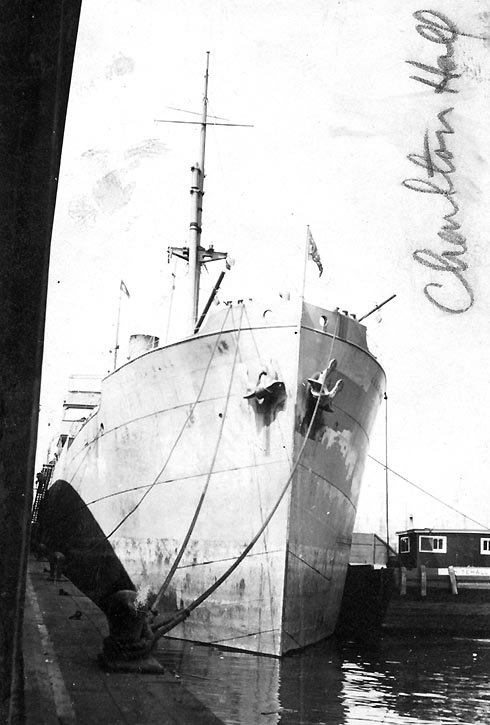
- Charlton Hall in about 1918

History
- Name: 1907: Charlton Hall; 1930: Atlantis; 1930: Anastasis
- Namesake: 1907: Charlton Hall; 1929: Atlantis
- Owner: 1907: CG Dunn & Co; 1914: US Steel Products Co.; 1930: M Kulukundis; 1930: K Psychas
- Operator: 1914: Isthmian SS Co; 1918: United States Navy
- Port of registry: 1907: (United Kingdom) Liverpool; 1914: (United States) New York; 1929: (Greece) Syra
- Builder: Wm Hamilton & Co, Port Glasgow
- Yard number: 192
- Launched: 14 May 1907
- Completed: 1907
- Acquired: for US Navy, 10 June 1918
- Commissioned: by US Navy, 14 June 1918
- Decommissioned: by US Navy, 29 January 1919
- Identification: 1907: UK official number 124071; code letters HLBP; 1914: US official number 212853; code letters LDQB; 1918: pennant number ID-1359; call sign KLU; 1933: code letters JHDD
- Fate: scrapped in Shanghai, 1934

General characteristics
- Type: cargo ship
- Tonnage: 4,749 GRT, 3,000 NRT
- Displacement: 11,300 tons
- Length: 400.0 ft (121.9 m)
- Beam: 50.0 ft (15.2 m)
- Draught: 25 ft 4 1/2 in (7.73 m)
- Depth: 27.2 ft (8.3 m)
- Decks: 1
- Installed power: 481 NHP, 2,200 ihp
- Propulsion: triple-expansion engine
- Speed: 11 knots (20 km/h)
- Complement: in US Navy service: 62
- Armament: In US Navy service: 1 × 5-inch/40-caliber gun; 1 × 3-inch/50-caliber gun

USS Charlton Hall (ID-1359) was a cargo steamship that was built in Scotland in 1907 and served in the merchant fleets of the United Kingdom, United States and Greece. She served in the United States Navy in 1918. She was renamed Atlantis and then Anastasis in 1930. She was scrapped in China in 1934.

== Building and first owner ==
William Hamilton and Company built the ship in Port Glasgow on the River Clyde, launching her on 14 May 1907. Her registered length was 400.0 ft (121.9 m), her beam was 50.0 ft (15.2 m) and her depth was 27.2 ft (8.3 m). Her tonnages were 4,749 GRT and 3,000 NRT.

She had a single screw, driven by three-cylinder triple-expansion steam engine that was rated at 481 NHP and gave her a speed of 11 knots (20 km/h).

The ship's first owners were Charles G Dunn and Company of Liverpool, who named all their ships after English country houses whose name ended in "Hall". She was named after Charlton Hall, Northumberland. Dunn & Co registered her at Liverpool. Her United Kingdom official number was 124071 and her code letters were HLBP.

== US ownership ==
In 1914 the United States Steel Products Co bought three of CG Dunn's ships: Charlton Hall, Craster Hall and Crofton Hall, and registered them in New York. Her US official number was 212853 and her code letters were LDQB. By 1917 she was equipped for wireless telegraphy. By 1918 her call sign was KLU.

On 10 June 1918 the United States Shipping Board transferred Charlton Hall to the US Navy. On 14 June she was commissioned into the Navy as USS Charlton Hall, with the Identification Number (ID) 1359. She was defensively armed with one 5-inch/40-caliber gun and one 3-inch/50-caliber gun.

She made three voyages for the Naval Overseas Transportation Service, taking supplies for the American Expeditionary Forces from New York to France. She began her first voyage on 11 June and completed the last on 23 December 1918, six weeks after the Armistice of 11 November 1918. On 29 January 1919 the Navy decommissioned Charlton Hall at Newport News, Virginia. On 3 February she was transferred to the US Shipping Board at New York City, who returned her to her owner.

== Greek ownership ==
By 1930 an M Kulukundis had bought Charlton Hall, renamed her Atlantis and registered her on the Aegean island of Syra in Greece. This may have been the Greek ship-owner Manuel Kulukundis, who founded Rethymnis & Kulukundis and Counties Ship Management in London.

Before the end of 1930, Kulukundis sold the ship on to K Psychas, who renamed her Anastasis. By 1933 her code letters were JHDD. On 4 April 1934 Anastasis arrived in Shanghai to be scrapped.

== Bibliography ==
- Lloyd's Register of British and Foreign Shipping. Vol. I–Steamers. London: Lloyd's Register of Shipping. 1908 – via Internet Archive.
- Lloyd's Register of Shipping. Vol. I–Steamers. London: Lloyd's Register of Shipping. 1914 – via Internet Archive.
- Lloyd's Register of Shipping. Vol. I–Steamers. London: Lloyd's Register of Shipping. 1917 – via Internet Archive.
- Lloyd's Register of Shipping (PDF). Vol. II–Steamers and Motorships of 300 tons gross and over. London: Lloyd's Register of Shipping. 1933 – via Southampton City Council.
- Lloyd's Register of Shipping (PDF). Vol. II–Steamers and Motorships of 300 tons gross and over. London: Lloyd's Register of Shipping. 1933 – via Southampton City Council.
- The Marconi Press Agency Ltd (1918). The Year Book of Wireless Telegraphy and Telephony. London: The Wireless Press, Ltd.
- Mercantile Navy List. London. 1909 – via Crew List Index Project.
