= SS Marietta E =

British cargo ship

Coordinates: 31.49°S 31.11°E

History

United Kingdom
- Name: SS Marietta E
- Owner: Leith Hill Shipping Co Ltd
- Operator: Counties Ship Management Co Ltd, London
- Builder: William Hamilton & Co, Port Glasgow
- Completed: June 1940
- Out of service: 4 March 1943
- Identification: UK official number 167596
- Fate: Sunk by torpedo

General characteristics
- Type: Cargo ship
- Tonnage: 7,628 GRT; tonnage under deck 7,217; 5,595 NRT
- Length: 421.1 ft (128.4 m) p/p
- Beam: 60.4 ft (18.4 m)
- Draught: 28 ft 2 1/2 in (8.60 m)
- Depth: 35.8 ft (10.9 m)
- Installed power: 520 NHP
- Propulsion: triple-expansion steam engine; single screw
- Crew: 45
- Notes: sister ships: SS Kingston Hill, SS Lulworth Hill, SS Michael E, SS Primrose Hill

SS Marietta E was a British cargo ship completed by William Hamilton & Co in Port Glasgow on the Firth of Clyde in June 1940. She had a single 520 NHP triple-expansion steam engine built by David Rowan and Company of Glasgow, that drove a single screw. She had eight corrugated furnaces heating two 225 lb_{f}/in^{2} single-ended boilers with a combined heating surface of 7,643 square feet (710 m^{2}), plus one auxiliary boiler.

She was owned by Leith Hill Shipping Co Ltd and managed by Counties Ship Management Co Ltd of London (CSM), both of which were offshoots of the Rethymnis & Kulukundis shipbroking company. She was named after Marietta Eustathiou, a member of Nicholas Eustathiou shipping concerns that had a major shareholding in her.

Marietta E was a sister ship of SS Michael E, SS Lulworth Hill and SS Primrose Hill, which also were managed by CSM and owned by companies associated with R&K.

Position of Marietta E's wreck off the coast of South Africa

== Sinking ==
Early in 1943 she sailed from New York, bound for Alexandria in Egypt via Durban and Aden. She was laden with a cargo of government and commercial stores and deck cargo of eight LCPL landing craft. In Durban she joined convoy DN-21 to Alexandria via Aden. At 0346 hrs on 4 March in the Indian Ocean east of East London, German submarine U-160 fired two torpedoes at the convoy, one of which sank the Marietta E killing four crew and one DEMS gunner. South African Navy rescue launch R8 rescued the Master, 33 crew and six DEMS gunners and landed them at Durban.
