= SS Michael E =

World War II British CAM ship

Coordinates: 48.50°N 29.0°W

History

United Kingdom
- Name: Michael E
- Owner: Bury Hill Shipping Co Ltd
- Operator: Counties Ship Management Co Ltd, London
- Port of registry: (United Kingdom) London
- Builder: William Hamilton & Co, Port Glasgow
- Completed: May 1941
- Identification: UK official number 168165; Call sign BCKB
- Fate: Torpedoed and sunk, 2 June 1941

General characteristics
- Type: Cargo ship
- Tonnage: 7,628 GRT; tonnage under deck 7,217; 5,508 NRT
- Length: 421.1 ft (128.4 m) p/p; 434.5 ft (132.4 m) o/a
- Beam: 60.4 ft (18.4 m)
- Draught: 23 ft 2 1/4 in (7.07 m)
- Depth: 35.8 ft (10.9 m)
- Installed power: 443 NHP
- Propulsion: triple-expansion steam engine; screw
- Crew: 46 Merchant Navy personnel, 12 RAF personnel, four DEMS gunners
- Aircraft carried: 1 Hawker Sea Hurricane
- Aviation facilities: aircraft catapult
- Notes: sister ships: Kingston Hill, Lulworth Hill, Marietta E, Primrose Hill

SS Michael E was a 7,628 GRT cargo ship that was built in 1941. She was the first British catapult aircraft merchant ship (CAM ship): a merchant ship fitted with a rocket catapult to launch a single Hawker Hurricane fighter aircraft to defend a convoy against long-range German bombers. She was sunk on her maiden voyage by a German submarine.

== Description ==
Michael E was built by William Hamilton & Co Ltd, Port Glasgow. Launched in 1941, she was completed in May of that year. She was the United Kingdom's first CAM ship, armed with an aircraft catapult on her bow to launch a Hawker Sea Hurricane.

The ship was 421.1 feet (128.4 m) long between perpendiculars (434.5 feet (132.4 m) overall), with a beam of 60.4 feet (18.4 m). She had a depth of 35.8 feet (10.9 m) and a draught of 23 feet 2 1/4 inches (7.07 m). She was measured at 7,628 gross register tons (GRT) and 5,508 net register tons (NRT).

She had six corrugated furnaces feeding two 225 lbf/in^{2} (1,550 kPa; 15.8 kgf/cm^{2}) single-ended boilers with a combined heating surface of 5,940 square feet (552 m^{2}). The boilers fed a 443 nominal horsepower triple-expansion steam engine that had cylinders of 24 inches (61 cm), 39 inches (99 cm) and 68 inches (170 cm) diameter by 48 inches (120 cm) stroke. The engine was built by David Rowan & Co Ltd, Glasgow.

== History ==
Michael E was owned by the Bury Hill Shipping Co Ltd. a company owned by the Nicholas Eustathiou shipping concerns. She was placed under the management of Counties Ship Management Ltd of London, an offshoot of the Rethymnis & Kulukundis shipbroking company. She was named after Michael Eustathiou, a member of the Nicholas Eustathiou family that had a major shareholding in her. Her Code Letters were BCKB, her UK Official Number was 163168 and she was registered in London.

Michael E was a sister ship of Kingston Hill, Lulworth Hill, Marietta E and Primrose Hill, which also were managed by CSM and owned by companies associated with R&K.

Approximate position of Michael E's wreck

== Sinking ==
On 28 May 1941 Michael E sailed in ballast on her maiden voyage from Belfast, Northern Ireland bound for Halifax, Nova Scotia with convoy OB 327. The convoy was dispersed on 1 June and at 20:43 hours on 2 June Michael E was in the North Atlantic several hundred miles southwest of Cape Clear when U-108 fired two torpedoes at her. One missed but the other struck her in the stern killing a crew member and two DEMS gunners, and at 22:21 hours she sank by the stern. On 3 June the Dutch cargo ship Alcinous rescued Michael E's master, 44 crew, two gunners and 12 Royal Air Force personnel.

== Replacement ship ==
In September 1941 William Hamilton & Co completed a second CAM ship of the same class for CSM. She was launched as Primrose Hill and effectively replaced Michael E. Primrose Hill survived until October 1942 when a German-operated submarine sank her by torpedo and shellfire.

== Sources & further reading ==
- Sedgwick, Stanley; Kinnaird, Mark; O'Donoghue, K.J. (1993) [1992]. London & Overseas Freighters, 1948–92: A Short History. Kendal: World Ship Society. ISBN 0-905617-68-1.
- Sedgwick, Stanley; Sprake, R.F. (1977). London & Overseas Freighters Limited 1949–1977. Kendal: World Ship Society. ISBN 0905617037.
- Slader, John (1988). The Red Duster at War. London: William Kimber & Co Ltd. pp. 143–144. ISBN 0-7183-0679-1.
