= MS Agamemnon =

Coordinates: 3°28′N 105°24′E

History

Netherlands
- Name: Agamemnon (1947-1966); Sincere (1966-1969)
- Owner: Koninklijke Nederlandsche Stoomboot Maatschappij
- Builder: William Hamilton & Co., Port Glasgow
- Yard number: 471
- Launched: 11 December 1946
- Completed: June 1947
- Identification: IMO number: 5004520
- Fate: Sank, 29 June 1969

General characteristics
- Type: Cargo ship
- Tonnage: 2,515 GRT; 981 NRT; 3,357 DWT
- Length: 349 ft (106 m)
- Beam: 48 ft (15 m)
- Draught: 20 ft (6.1 m)
- Propulsion: 5-cylinder oil-fired Doxford engine, 3,200 bhp (2,386 kW)
- Speed: 15 knots (28 km/h; 17 mph)

MS Agamemnon was a Dutch general cargo vessel built by William Hamilton and Company of Port Glasgow, Scotland. She was launched on 11 December 1946 and completed in June 1947. She was renamed Sincere in 1966. The ship caught fire and foundered on 29 June 1969 off Bunguran Island, Indonesia.
