= P-class patrol boat =

1916 class of British sloops-of-war

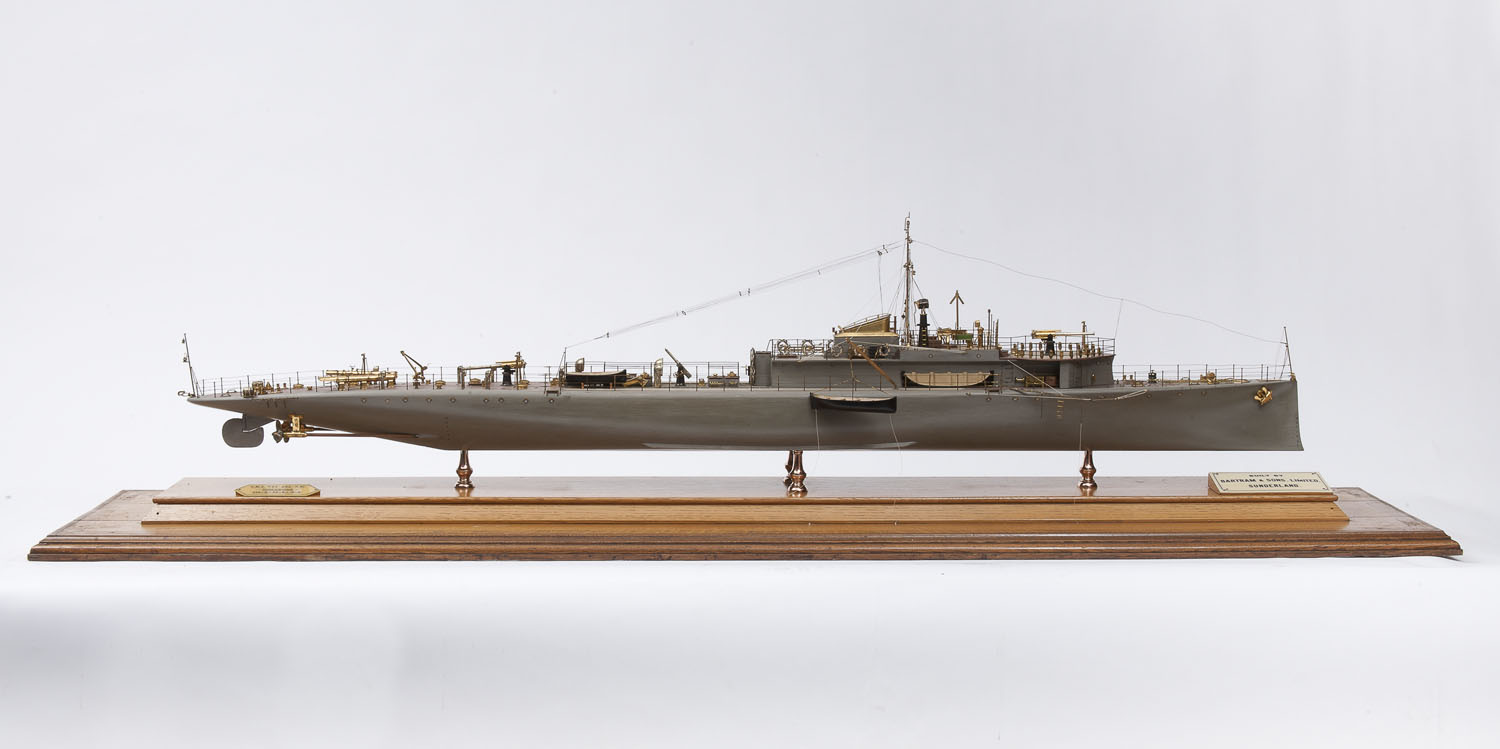
- Tyne & Wear Archives & Museums Service image of 1:48 scale model P-class patrol boat HMS P23

Class overview
- Name: P class
- Operators: Royal Navy
- In service: 1916–1921
- Planned: 64
- Completed: 64 (including 20 as PC-class Q-ships)
- Lost: 3

General characteristics
- Type: Patrol boat
- Displacement: 613 long tons (623 t)
- Length: 244 ft 6 in (74.52 m) o.a.
- Beam: 23 ft 9 in (7.24 m)
- Draught: 8 ft (2.4 m)
- Installed power: 3,500 shp (2,600 kW)
- Propulsion: 2 × steam turbines; 2 × cylindrical boilers; 2 × screws
- Speed: 20 knots (37 km/h; 23 mph)
- Range: Oil fuel
- Complement: 50–54 men
- Armament: (As designed): 1 × 4-inch (102 mm) gun; 1 × QF 2-pounder (40 mm) A/A; 2 × 14-inch torpedo tubes

The P class were a series of patrol boats operated by the Royal Navy during the First World War. Twenty-four ships to this design were ordered in May 1915 (numbered P.11 to P.34) and another thirty between February and June 1916 (numbered P.35 to P.64) under the Emergency War Programme for the Royal Navy in the First World War. Ten of the latter group were in December 1916 altered on the stocks before launch for use as decoy Q-ships and were renumbered as PC-class patrol boats. None were named initially, although in 1925 P.38 was given the name Spey.

These vessels were designed to replace destroyers in coastal operations but had twin screws, a very low freeboard, ram bows of hardened steel, a sharply cutaway funnel and a small turning circle. Clearly seen as the linear descendants of the late 19th century steam torpedo boats and coastal destroyers, many were fitted with the 14-inch torpedo tubes removed from old torpedo boats.

With the survival of a builder's diary by William Bartram, full details of the sea trials of P.23 on 21 June 1916 exist. She worked up to 21.8 knots (40.4 km/h; 25.1 mph). Bartram's commissioned a model from Sunderland model maker C Crawford & Sons and this model, in the collections of Sunderland Museum and Heritage Service, is stored in the model store of Tyne & Wear Archives & Museums Service at the Discovery Museum.

== PC-class sloops ==
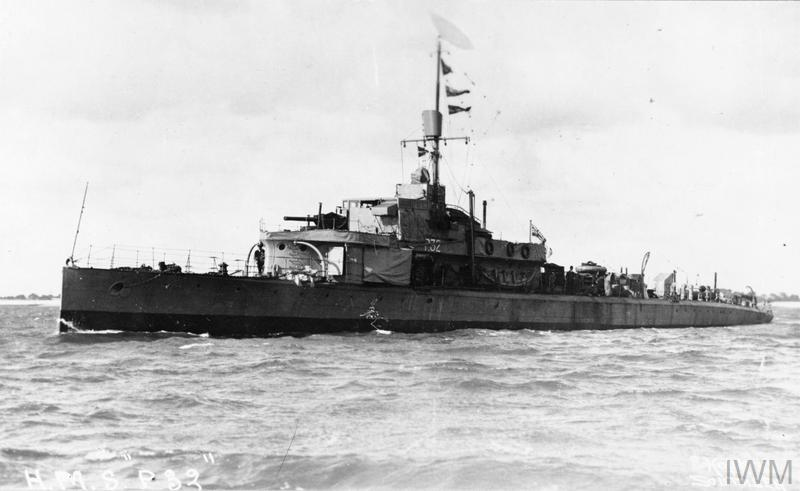
Patrol boat HMS P32

Ten of these ships were completed as Q-ships, with their numbers being altered by the addition of a "C" after the "P". These were termed the PC-class sloops. A further batch of ten ships were ordered in 1917 (PC.65 to PC.70 in January, and PC.71 to PC.74 in June). These were built to resemble small merchant vessels for use as decoy (Q) ships, and were alternatively known as "PQ" boats. Again, none were named, although in 1925 PC.73 was given the name Dart, while PC.55 and PC.69 were named Baluchi and Pathan respectively upon transfer to the Royal Indian Navy in May 1922.

The PC-class ships were completed with slight enlargement from the standard P class. They were 247 feet (75 m) long overall and 25 1/2 feet (7.8 m) in breadth, although they had similar machinery. Displacement varied from 682 tons in PC.42, PC.43, PC.44, PC.51, PC.55 and PC.56 to 694 tons in PC.60 to PC.63 and in PC.65 to PC.74. They carried one 4-inch and two 12-pounder guns and no torpedo tubes.

== Ships ==
Ship	Builder	Launched	Notes
1915 batch
P.11	J. Samuel White & Company, Cowes	14 October 1915	Sold for breaking up 1 December 1921
P.12	White, Cowes	4 December 1915	Sunk in collision in the Channel 4 November 1918
P.13	William Hamilton and Company, Port Glasgow	7 June 1916	Renumbered P.75 on 31 July 1917 and sold for breaking up 31 July 1923
P.14	Charles Connell and Company, Scotstoun	4 July 1916	Sold for breaking up 31 July 1923
P.15	Workman, Clark and Company, Belfast	24 January 1916	Sold on 26 November 1921
P.16	Workman Clark	23 March 1916	Sold on 26 November 1921
P.17	Workman Clark	21 October 1915	Sold on 26 November 1921
P.18	A. & J. Inglis, Glasgow	20 April 1916	Sold 26 November 1921
P.19	Northumberland Shipbuilding Company, Howdon	21 February 1916	Sold 24 July 1923
P.20	Northumberland Shipbuilding	3 April 1916	Sold for breaking up in May 1923
P.21	Russell & Company, Port Glasgow	31 March 1916	Sold 26 November 1921
P.22	Caird & Company, Greenock	22 February 1916	Sold for breaking up 12 December 1923
P.23	Bartram & Sons, Sunderland	5 March 1916	Sold 24 July 1923
P.24	Harland & Wolff, Govan	24 November 1915	Sold for breaking up 1 December 1921
P.25	Harland & Wolff, Govan	15 January 1916	Sold for breaking up 1 December 1921
P.26	Tyne Iron Shipbuilding Company, Newcastle upon Tyne	22 December 1915	Mined off Le Havre 10 April 1917
P.27	Joseph T. Eltringham & Company, South Shields	21 December 1915	Sold 24 July 1923
P.28	Robert Thompson & Sons, Sunderland	6 March 1916	Sold 24 July 1923
P.29	William Gray & Company, West Hartlepool	6 December 1915	Sold 24 July 1923
P.30	W. Gray & Co	5 February 1916	Sold 24 July 1923
P.31	J. Readhead & Sons, South Shields	5 February 1916	Sold for breaking up 16 December 1926
P.32	W. Harkess & Sons, Middlesbrough	20 January 1916	Sold for breaking up 1 December 1921
P.33	Napier & Miller, Old Kilpatrick (Glasgow)	8 June 1916	Sold for breaking up 1 December 1921
P.34	Barclay Curle & Company, Whiteinch	22 March 1916	Sold for breaking up 1 December 1921
1916 batch
P.35	Caird & Company	29 January 1917	Sold for breaking up 15 January 1923
P.36	Eltringham	25 October 1916	Sold for breaking up in May 1923
P.37	W. Gray & Co	28 October 1916	Sold 18 February 1924
P.38	William Hamilton	10 February 1917	Sold for breaking up 7 December 1937
P.39	Inglis	1 March 1917	Sold for breaking up 6 September 1922
P.40	White, Cowes	12 July 1916	Sold for breaking up 1937
P.41	Bartram	23 March 1917	Sold for breaking up 6 September 1922
P.42	Caird & Company	7 June 1917	Renumbered PC.42 before being launched and completed as PC-class sloop. Sold for breaking up 1 December 1921
P.43	Caird & Company	14 August 1917	Renumbered PC.43 before being launched and completed as PC-class sloop. Sold for breaking up 20 January 1923
P.44	Eltringham	25 April 1917	Renumbered PC.44 before being launched and completed as PC-class sloop. Sold for breaking up 9 April 1923
P.45	W. Gray & Co	24 January 1917	Sold for breaking up 15 January 1923
P.46	Harkess	7 February 1917	Sold for breaking up 28 October 1925
P.47	Readhead	9 July 1917	Sold for breaking up 28 October 1923
P.48	Readhead	5 September 1917	Sold for breaking up May 1923
P.49	Thompson	19 April 1917	Sold for breaking up 15 January 1923
P.50	Tyne Iron	25 November 1916	Sold for breaking up 1 December 1921
P.51	Tyne Iron	25 November 1916	Renumbered PC.51 before being launched and completed as PC-class sloop. Sold for breaking up 18 January 1923,
P.52	White, Cowes	28 September 1916	Sold for breaking up May 1923
P.53	Barclay Curle	8 February 1917	Sold 18 February 1924
P.54	Barclay Curle	25 April 1917	Sold 18 February 1924
P.55	Barclay Curle	5 May 1917	Renumbered PC.55 before being launched and completed as PC-class sloop. Transferred to Royal Indian Navy February 1922, renamed Baluchi in May 1922; sold 1935
P.56	Barclay Curle	2 June 1917	Renumbered PC.56 before being launched and completed as PC-class sloop. On 25 December 1917 helped sink SM U-87. Sold for breaking up 31 July 1923
P.57	Hamilton	6 August 1917	Sold to Egypt 21 May 1920 and renamed El Raqib
P.58	Hamilton	9 May 1918	Sold for breaking up 1 December 1921
P.59	White, Cowes	2 November 1917	Sold for breaking up 16 June 1938
P.60	Workman Clark	4 June 1917	Renumbered PC.60 before being launched and completed as PC-class sloop. Sold 18 February 1924
P.61	Workman Clark	19 June 1917	Renumbered PC.61 before being launched and completed as PC-class sloop. Sold for breaking up 9 April 1923
P.62	Harland & Wolff, Govan	7 June 1917	Renumbered PC.62 before being launched and completed as PC-class sloop. Sold for breaking up 1 December 1921.
P.63	Connell	2 October 1917	Renumbered PC.63 before being launched and completed as PC-class sloop. Sold for breaking up May 1923
P.64	Inglis	30 August 1917	Sold for breaking up 9 April 1923
1917 batch
PC.65	Eltringham	5 September 1917	Sold for breaking up 8 January 1923
PC.66	Harkess	12 February 1918	Sold for breaking up 31 July 1923
PC.67	White, Cowes	7 May 1917	Sold for breaking up 1 December 1921
PC.68	White, Cowes	29 June 1917	Sold for breaking up 1 December 1921
PC.69	Workman Clark, Belfast	11 March 1918	Transferred to Royal Indian Navy, 5 August 1921, renamed Pathan 30 May 1922; sunk by Italian Brin-class submarine Galvani, 23 June 1940.
PC.70	Workman Clark, Belfast	12 April 1918	Sold for breaking up 3 September 1926
PC.71	White, Cowes	18 March 1918	Sold for breaking up 28 October 1925
PC.72	White, Cowes	8 June 1918	Sold for breaking up 28 October 1925
PC.73	White, Cowes	1 August 1918	Renamed Dart in April 1925. Sold for breaking up 16 June 1938
PC.74	White, Cowes	4 October 1918	Operated as Q-ship Chatsgrove during WW2 (from late 1939 to July 1945). Sold for breaking up 19 July 1948

== Bibliography ==
- Dittmar, F. J.; Colledge, J. J. (1972). British Warships 1914–1919. Shepperton: Ian Allan. ISBN 0-7110-0380-7.
- Gardiner, Robert; Gray, Randal (1985). Conway's All The World's Fighting Ships 1906–1921. London: Conway Maritime Press. ISBN 0-85177-245-5.
- Rohwer, Jürgen; Hümmelchen, Gerhard (2005) [1972]. Chronology of the War at Sea, 1939–1945: The Naval History of World War Two (3rd rev. ed.). London: Chatham Publishing. ISBN 1-86176-257-7.
