= SS Kingston Hill =

Cargo ship

Coordinates: 09.35°N 21.40°W

History

United Kingdom
- Name: SS Kingston Hill
- Namesake: Kingston Hill, south London
- Operator: Counties Ship Management Co Ltd, London
- Builder: William Hamilton & Co, Port Glasgow
- Launched: 17 October 1940
- Completed: December 1940
- Out of service: 8 June 1941
- Identification: UK official number 168045; Call sign GNMM
- Fate: Sunk by torpedo

General characteristics
- Type: Cargo ship
- Tonnage: 7,628 GRT; tonnage under deck 7,217; 5,595 NRT
- Length: 421.1 ft (128.4 m) p/p
- Beam: 60.4 ft (18.4 m)
- Draught: 35.8 ft (10.9 m)
- Installed power: 520 NHP
- Propulsion: triple-expansion steam engine; screw
- Crew: 62
- Notes: sister ships: SS Lulworth Hill, SS Marietta E, SS Michael E, SS Primrose Hill

SS Kingston Hill was a cargo ship built by William Hamilton & Co in Port Glasgow on the Firth of Clyde. She was completed in December 1940. She was managed by Counties Ship Management Co Ltd of London (CSM), an offshoot of the Rethymnis & Kulukundis shipbroking company. She was a sister ship of SS Lulworth Hill, SS Marietta E, SS Michael E and SS Primrose Hill, which were also managed by CSM but owned by other R&K companies.

Kingston Hill had a single 520 NHP triple-expansion steam engine driving a single screw. She had eight corrugated furnaces heating two 225 lb_{f}/in^{2} single-ended boilers with a combined heating surface of 7,643 square feet (710 m^{2}), plus one auxiliary boiler.

On 22 February 1941 Luftwaffe aircraft bombed and damaged the ship. She was repaired at Glasgow.

Approximate position of Kingston Hill's wreck

== Sinking ==
In May 1941 Kingston Hill sailed from Cardiff and Glasgow laden with coal and general cargo for Alexandria in Egypt. To avoid the enemy-controlled waters of the Mediterranean she was heading via Cape Town, South Africa, but was unescorted. She was southwest of the Cape Verde Islands heading into the South Atlantic when the German submarine U-38 hit her with two torpedoes at 0108 hrs on 8 June 1941. She sank at 0125 hrs with the loss of her Master and 13 crew. 16 crew were rescued by the Royal Navy destroyer HMS Achates and returned to Greenock. 26 crew were rescued by the US tanker Alabama and landed at Cape Town.

== Sources & further reading ==
- Sedgwick, Stanley; Kinnaird, Mark; O'Donoghue, K.J. (1993) [1992]. London & Overseas Freighters, 1948-92: A Short History. World Ship Society. ISBN 0-905617-68-1.
- Sedgwick, Stanley; Sprake, R.F. (1977). London & Overseas Freighters Limited 1949-1977. World Ship Society. ISBN 0905617037.
