= SS Sea Marlin =

American C3-S-A2 cargo ship operated during World War II

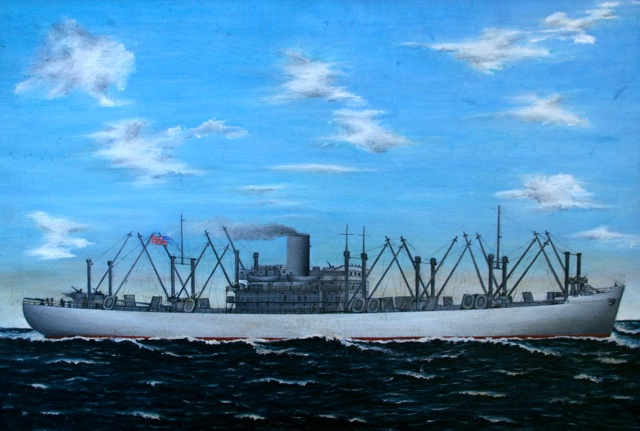
- Sea Marlin as painted by Captain George Ekstrom

History

United States
- Name: Sea Marlin
- Owner: War Shipping Administration
- Operator: Grace Line
- Port of registry: New Orleans, LA
- Builder: Ingalls Shipbuilding, Pascagoula Mississippi
- Yard number: 401, USMC 857
- Laid down: 21 April 1943
- Launched: 27 September 1943
- In service: 31 January 1944
- Out of service: 2 May 1946
- Identification: U.S. Official Number: 244978; Signal: KVMO
- Notes: U.S.N. Armed Guard aboard awarded Battle Star – Invasion of Okinawa

Isthmian Steamship Company
- Acquired: 1947
- Renamed: SS Steel Director
- Port of registry: New York
- Identification: U.S. Official Number: 244978; Signal: KVMO
- Fate: 6 March 1956 Isthmian was sold to States Marine Lines.

States Marine Lines
- Name: SS Steel Director
- Acquired: 6 March 1956
- Port of registry: New York
- Identification: U.S. Official Number: 244978; Signal: KVMO
- Fate: Scrapped June 1971

General characteristics
- Class & type: C3-S-A2
- Tonnage: 7,886 GRT, 4,600 NRT; 10,681 DWT
- Length: 492 ft (150.0 m) (overall); 468.5 ft (142.8 m) (registry)
- Beam: 69.6 ft (21.2 m)
- Draft: 28.5 ft (8.7 m)
- Depth: 29.5 ft (9.0 m)
- Propulsion: Westinghouse DR geared turbine, 2 x single screwed shaft horsepower 8,500
- Speed: 16.5 knots
- Capacity: 447,760 cu ft (12,679.2 m^{3}) (bale); 2,111 (troops)
- Complement: Merchant Marine, US Army and US Navy
- Armament: 1 single 5 inch mount aft. 12 AA mounts fore, amidship and aft

SS Sea Marlin was a C3-S-A2 cargo ship operated for the War Shipping Administration (WSA) by Grace Lines during World War II. WSA allocated Sea Marlin to United States Army requirements. Sea Marlin was crewed by United States Merchant Marines, with a contingent of the US Naval Armed Guards for the guns and had a complement of the US Army Transportation Corps (Water Division) aboard for troop administration.

The ship was laid down 21 April 1943 for the U.S. Maritime Commission (USMC) as hull #401, USMC #857 at Ingalls Shipbuilding in Pascagoula Mississippi. Sea Marlin was launched on 27 September 1943, completed conversion to a 2,111 berth transport on 31 January 1944 and immediately delivered to WSA at Mobile, Alabama.

Sea Marlin was registered with U.S. Official Number 244978, signal KVMO with home port of New Orleans at 7,886 GRT, 4,600 NRT with a registry length of 468.5 ft (142.8 m), 69.6 ft (21.2 m) beam and depth of 29.5 ft (9.0 m).

== World War II ==
Sea Marlin departed New Orleans on 9 February 1944 bound for the South West Pacific destinations including the ports of Townsville, Brisbane and Sydney in Australia, Milne Bay, Langemak in New Guinea and Auckland, New Zealand. After return to San Francisco 28 April the ship departed in May for the New Guinea area with stops at Milne Bay, Oro Bay, Finschhafen, Langemak and Seeadler on Manus Island with a return to San Francisco 9 July 1944. (Note: The Army operated major embarkation ports at San Francisco, Seattle and Los Angeles. See New York Port of Embarkation for the scope of such ports that included the port facilities themselves, often the entire port, as well as associated camps, rail facilities and other transportation assets.)

In the last half of 1944, the ship began supporting operations in the Central Pacific making two trips from San Francisco to Honolulu and then Eniwetok and Saipan via Honolulu August to October 1944. Shifting to Seattle the ship departed 30 November 1944 for Honolulu, Eniwetok and Saipan with the addition of calls at Tinian, Ulithi, Angaur, Peleliu, Manus Island, Guadalcanal, Noumea and Espiritu Santo with eventual return to San Francisco on 15 February 1945. On 10 March the ship again sailed for Honolulu, Eniwetok, Saipan, Nouméa, Guadalcanal and Ulithi with the addition of Okinawa arriving back in San Francisco 19 July to depart again 31 July for Eniwetok and Ulithi with the addition of Manila. The ship was delayed for repairs there after a collision in Manila Bay with the T2 type tanker Bemis Heights on 26 August 1945. Sea Marlin reached Los Angeles on 13 November 1945. The last Pacific operation for Sea Marlin was departure from Los Angeles on 12 December for Okinawa and return 18 January 1946 to Portland, Oregon with 1,962 troops.

In February, the ship transferred to the Atlantic making trips to Liverpool and Le Havre to return troops to the United States arriving in New York 1 April 1945. Sea Marlin then sailed for Norfolk, Virginia arriving 2 May for deactivation and lay up.

Among the units transported were: 17th Naval Construction Battalion & 31st Special Naval Construction Battalion (Seabees), 96th Infantry Division Headquarters personnel, Fuerza Aérea Expedicionaria Mexicana (Mexican Air Force) Escuadrón 201, 193rd Tank Battalion, and the US Army Air Force Sixth Bombardment Group.

Merchant ships did not receive battle stars but the ship's Naval Armed Guard received a Battle Star for the Assault and occupation of Okinawa Gunto for the period 24—30 June 1945.

== Post War Service ==
On May 2, 1946 Sea Marlin arrived at Norfolk for deactivation and entered the Reserve Fleet at Lee Hall, VA in the James River on 9 May. On 4 September the ship was removed from the reserve fleet under agreement with Moran Towing & Transportation Company for conversion under Maritime Commission contract to commercial configuration by the J.K Welding Company, Yonkers, NY for a cost of $300,000. Isthmian Steamship Company purchased Sea Marlin on 24 February 1947 for $1,280,730 changing its name to Steel Director. In 1956 the ship was sold to States Marine Lines and operated under the same name until scrapped in 1971. Steel Director departed Saigon, South Vietnam on 17 May 1971 for Kaohsiung, Republic of China prior where she was to be scrapped the next month.
