= SS Lulworth Hill =

British cargo ship

Coordinates: 10°10′S 01°00′E

History

United Kingdom
- Name: SS Lulworth Hill
- Owner: Dorset Steamship Co Ltd
- Operator: Counties Ship Management Co Ltd, London
- Builder: William Hamilton & Co, Port Glasgow
- Yard number: 440
- Launched: 24 June 1940
- Completed: 1940
- Out of service: 19 March 1943
- Identification: UK official number 167631; Call sign GMKG
- Fate: Sunk by torpedo

General characteristics
- Type: Cargo ship
- Tonnage: 7,628 GRT; tonnage under deck 7,217; 5,595 NRT
- Length: 421.1 ft (128.4 m)
- Beam: 60.4 ft (18.4 m)
- Draught: 35.8 ft (10.9 m)
- Installed power: 520 NHP; 2,150 ihp
- Propulsion: 3 cylinder triple-expansion steam engine
- Speed: 11 knots (20 km/h)
- Crew: 39
- Notes: sister ships: SS Kingston Hill, SS Marietta E, SS Michael E, SS Primrose Hill

SS Lulworth Hill was a British cargo ship completed by William Hamilton & Co in Port Glasgow on the Firth of Clyde in 1940. Lulworth Hill had a single 520 NHP triple-expansion steam engine driving a single screw. She had eight corrugated furnaces heating two 225 lb_{f}/in^{2} single-ended boilers with a combined heating surface of 7,643 square feet (710 m^{2}), plus one auxiliary boiler.

She was owned by Dorset Steamships Co Ltd and managed by Counties Ship Management Co Ltd of London (CSM), both of which were offshoots of the Rethymnis & Kulukundis shipbroking company. She was a sister ship of SS Kingston Hill, SS Marietta E, SS Michael E and SS Primrose Hill, which were also managed by CSM but owned by other R&K companies.

Approximate position of the sinking of Lulworth Hill in the South Atlantic.

== Sinking ==
The Italian navy submarine Leonardo da Vinci torpedoed the Lulworth Hill in the South Atlantic on 19 March 1943. 14 survivors made it onto a life raft. One source, seemingly quoting one of only three men to survive the sinking and subsequent ordeal on the life raft, states that the Germans surfaced and machine gunned the survivors; however, this is unlikely as the submarine was not German and the only other survivor of the life raft, in his book of the events, made no such accusation. The Leonardo da Vinci captured and took on board one survivor of the sinking, James Leslie Hull. After 29 days the UK authorities assumed that the Lulworth Hill had been lost with all hands and duly informed their families.

On 7 May the Royal Navy R-class destroyer HMS Rapid picked up one of the Lulworth Hill's liferafts. Of the 14 men that had survived the sinking, after 50 days adrift only two, Seaman Shipwright (i.e. carpenter) Kenneth Cooke and Able Seaman Colin Armitage, remained alive. On 7 December 1943 both men were awarded the George Medal and on 7 November 1944 the Lloyd's War Medal for Bravery at Sea. In 1985 a radio interview was broadcast in which Cooke described their ordeal and survival.

On 23 May 1943 Leonardo da Vinci was in the North Atlantic returning from patrol 300 miles (480 km) west of Vigo, Spain when the Royal Navy destroyer HMS Active depth charged and sank her. There were no survivors. James Hull, the prisoner from Lulworth Hill, had previously been transferred to the Italian submarine Finzi.

== Replacement ship ==
In 1947 Dorset Steamships bought the Empire ship SS Empire Mandarin and renamed her Lulworth Hill. In 1949 she was renamed Castle Hill. In 1950 she was transferred to a new Rethymnis & Kulukundis company, London & Overseas Freighters Ltd, who renamed her London Builder. LOF sold her in 1951 to new owners who registered her under the Panamanian flag of convenience as Silver Wake. She changed owners and names several more times, becoming Navarino in 1954, Stanhope in 1955 and Ardbrae in 1961. She was scrapped at Onomichi, Japan in 1966.

== Sources & further reading ==
- Cooke, Kenneth (1960). What Cares the Sea?. New York: McGraw-Hill.
- Sedgwick, Stanley; Kinnaird, Mark; O'Donoghue, K.J. (1993) [1992]. London & Overseas Freighters, 1948–92: A Short History. World Ship Society. ISBN 0-905617-68-1.
- Sedgwick, Stanley; Sprake, R.F. (1977). London & Overseas Freighters Limited 1949–1977. World Ship Society. ISBN 0905617037.
- Slader, John (1988). The Red Duster at War. London: William Kimber & Co Ltd. p. 241. ISBN 0-7183-0679-1.
