= SS Primrose Hill =

World War II British CAM ship

Coordinates: 18°58′N 28°40′W

History

United Kingdom
- Name: SS Primrose Hill
- Owner: Putney Hill Steamship Co Ltd
- Operator: Counties Ship Management Co Ltd, London
- Builder: William Hamilton & Co, Port Glasgow
- Yard number: 448
- Launched: 25 June 1941
- Completed: September 1941
- Out of service: 29 October 1942
- Home port: London
- Identification: UK official number 168208; Call sign BCJZ
- Fate: Sunk by torpedo & shellfire

General characteristics
- Type: Cargo ship
- Tonnage: 7,628 GRT; tonnage under deck 7,217; 5,595 NRT; 11,400 DWT
- Length: 421.1 ft (128.4 m) p/p
- Beam: 60.4 ft (18.4 m)
- Depth: 35.8 ft (10.9 m)
- Installed power: 443 NHP
- Propulsion: 3-cylinder triple-expansion steam engine
- Crew: 41 Merchant Navy plus eight DEMS gunners
- Aircraft carried: 1 Hawker Sea Hurricane
- Aviation facilities: aircraft catapult
- Notes: sister ships: SS Kingston Hill, SS Lulworth Hill, SS Marietta E, SS Michael E

SS Primrose Hill was a British CAM ship that saw action in World War II, armed with a catapult on her bow to launch a Hawker Sea Hurricane. She was completed by William Hamilton & Co in Port Glasgow on the Firth of Clyde in September 1941.

Primrose Hill was managed by Counties Ship Management Ltd of London (CSM), an offshoot of the Rethymnis & Kulukundis shipbroking company. Primrose Hill was CSM's second CAM ship, in effect replacing Michael E that had been torpedoed and sunk three months previously on her maiden voyage.

Primrose Hill's navigation equipment included an echo sounding device and a gyrocompass. Primrose Hill SS was a British Cargo Steamer of 7,628 tons built in 1941 by William Hamilton's & Co, Port Glasgow, Yard no 448 for Ruthi, Kuluku.

== Propulsion ==
Primrose Hill had six corrugated furnaces that heated two 225 lb_{f}/in^{2} single-ended boilers with a combined heating surface of 5,940 square feet (552 m^{2}). The boilers raised steam for a 443 NHP triple-expansion engine that had cylinders of 24 inches (61 cm), 39 inches (99 cm) and 68 inches (170 cm) diameter by 48 inches (120 cm) stroke. The engine was built by David Rowan & Co Ltd, Glasgow.

Approximate position of the sinking of Primrose Hill in the Atlantic.

== Sinking ==
On 16 October 1942 Primrose Hill sailed from Glasgow with a mixed cargo including 3,000 tons of coal, 1,796 tons of general cargo, war material and 11 aircraft. She was as a member of convoy ON 139 for Takoradi on the Gold Coast and Apapa in Nigeria. The convoy dispersed, and at 2118 hrs on 29 October she was northwest of the Cape Verde Islands when UD-5, a submarine that the Kriegsmarine had captured from the Dutch Navy after the surrender of the Netherlands, fired two torpedoes at her. One missed but the other hit Primrose Hill in her engine room killing the second engineer, a greaser and a fireman, and setting the fuel oil in her bunkers on fire. Two of her lifeboats and a number of liferafts were destroyed by the concussion of the blast.

The Master, eight gunners and surviving 37 officers and men abandoned ship in four lifeboats and moved to windward as the fire spread throughout the ship. The officers destroyed their uniforms to conceal their identity. UD-5 surfaced and her commander, Bruno Mahn, questioned the survivors asking for the Master to come aboard UD-5. The survivors claimed all their officers had been killed in the explosion and fire. Mahn clearly did not believe them, but being unable to identify his quarry he gave up and UD-5 left the survivors in the boats.

Primrose Hill remained afloat so at 2246 hrs UD-5 fired her 88 mm (3.5 in) deck gun, hitting the steamship near her bridge. She continued to float so at 2313 hrs UD-5 fired her deck gun again, hitting Primrose Hill's stern. She broke her back and sank at 2345 hrs.

== Eight days in the lifeboats ==
The master and third officer had rescued sextants, a chronometer, charts and navigation books from Primrose Hill's bridge. However, the boats proved to be very short of rations and water for the number of men who had survived. On the morning of 30 October the four lifeboats, keeping close together, set sail and steered eastwards for the Cape Verde Islands. However, by the morning of 31 October wind and currents had taken them westwards. On 1 November they were further west and No. 2 lifeboat lost her rudder. One lifeboat was steel and sailed much worse than the three wooden ones, so on 2 November her occupants transferred themselves and her rations to the three wooden boats and cut the steel one adrift.

On 3 November the remaining boats had been carried further west so they lowered sail and tried rowing, but found the wind and current too strong. At 0300 hrs on 4 November another U-boat found the boats, questioned the crew and then sailed on. Overnight to 5 November the boats managed to row a little eastwards. On 6 November the survivors were just giving up hope of making headway against the current towards Cape Verde and were turning to sail with the current 1,500 miles (2,400 km) in the opposite direction to Brazil, when after 1430 hrs the survivors sighted the Elder Dempster Lines cargo ship MV Sansu about 6 miles (9.7 km) away heading southwards. The crew burned smoke flares to attract the Sansu's attention and rowed to meet her. At about 1530 hrs the Sansu picked up the survivors and on 11 November landed them at Freetown in Sierra Leone.

== Replacement ship ==
In 1947 CSM took over the 1943-built Liberty ship Samflora and renamed her Primrose Hill. In 1949 she was transferred to another Rethymnis & Kulukundis company, London & Overseas Freighters Ltd, who renamed her London Vendor. LOF sold her in 1951 to new owners who registered her in Panama as a flag of convenience and renamed her Cabanos. In 1963 she passed to new Panamanian owners who renamed her Thebean. She was registered in Greece from 1964 and was scrapped at Onomichi, Japan in 1968.
