= USS Howick Hall =

Cargo steamship that served in the US Army, US Navy and US Maritime Commission

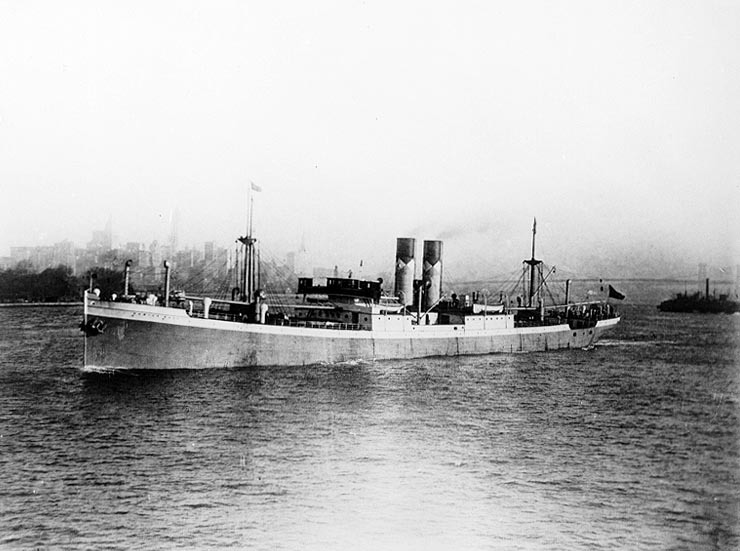
- Howick Hall in New York Harbor 1910–1915, in the colours of her first owners, CG Dunn & Co

History
- Name: 1910: Howick Hall; 1929: Dovenden; 1935: Ircania; 1941: Raceland
- Namesake: 1910: Howick Hall
- Owner: 1910: CG Dunn & Co; 1915: US Steel Products Co.; 1929: Exeter Shipping Co; 1932: McAllum SS Co; 1932: Lambert Brothers; 1935: Halford Constant; 1935: Ditta Luigi Pittaluga Vap; 1937: SA Coop di Nav 'Garibaldi'; 1941: US Maritime Commission
- Operator: 1915: Isthmian SS Co; 1918: United States Army; 1918: United States Navy
- Port of registry: 1910: (United Kingdom) Liverpool; 1915: (United States) New York; 1929: (United Kingdom) London; 1935: (Kingdom of Italy) Genoa; 1941: Panama
- Builder: Wm Hamilton & Co, Port Glasgow
- Yard number: 212
- Launched: 1 October 1920
- Completed: October 1910
- Commissioned: by US Navy, 24 August 1918
- Decommissioned: by US Navy, 13 March 1919
- Identification: 1910: UK official number 131303; code letters HRTN; 1915: US official number 212693; code letters LDQF; 1918: call sign KLT; pennant number ID-1303; 1930: code letters LFKH; call sign GQWN; 1935: call sign IBLP; 1941: call sign HPYY
- Fate: Sunk by aircraft in 1942

General characteristics
- Type: cargo ship
- Tonnage: 4,923 GRT, 3,131 NRT
- Displacement: 8,097 tons
- Length: 400.8 ft (122.2 m)
- Beam: 51.5 ft (15.7 m)
- Draught: 25 ft 10 in (7.87 m)
- Depth: 27.0 ft (8.2 m)
- Decks: 2
- Installed power: 507 NHP
- Propulsion: triple-expansion engine
- Speed: 10 knots (19 km/h)
- Complement: in US Navy service, 91
- Crew: 1941: 39; 1942: 45

USS Howick Hall (ID-1303) was a cargo steamship that was built in Scotland in 1910 and served in the merchant fleets of the United Kingdom, United States, Italy and Panama. She served in the United States Army in 1917–18 and then the United States Navy in 1918–19. The United States Maritime Commission bought her in 1941, and a German air attack sank her in 1942.

The ship was launched as Howick Hall, and kept that name when she served in the US Army and US Navy. She was renamed Dovenden in 1929, Ircania in 1935 and Raceland in 1941. Her name was Raceland when she was sunk in 1942.

== Building and first owner ==
William Hamilton and Company built the ship in Port Glasgow on the River Clyde, launching her on 1 October 1920 and completing her later that month. Her registered length was 400.8 ft (122.2 m), her beam was 51.5 ft (15.7 m) and her depth was 27.0 ft (8.2 m). Her tonnages were 4,923 GRT and 3,094 NRT.

She had a single screw, driven by three-cylinder triple-expansion steam engine that was rated at 507 NHP and gave her a speed of 10 knots (19 km/h). Among cargo steamships she was unusual in having two funnels (smokestacks). Her derricks could lift up to 35 tons, which was unusually heavy for a ship of that era.

The ship's first owners were Charles G Dunn and Company of Liverpool, who named all their ships after English country houses whose name ended in "Hall". She was named after Howick Hall in Northumberland. Dunn & Co registered her at Liverpool. Her United Kingdom official number was 131303 and her code letters were HRTN.

== US ownership ==
In 1915 the United States Steel Products Co. acquired Howick Hall and registered her in New York. Her US official number was 212693 and her code letters were LDQF. She was managed by US Steel's Isthmian Steamship Company. In September 1917 the US Army acquired her. On 24 August 1918 took her over from the Army, commissioning her at Baltimore, Maryland as USS Howick Hall with the identification number (ID) 1303. By 1917 she was equipped for wireless telegraphy, and by 1918 her call sign was KLT.

Howick Hall made two voyages for the Naval Overseas Transportation Service. After being commissioned, she loaded cargo at Baltimore, steamed to New York and joined a convoy across the Atlantic. On 30 September she reached Saint-Nazaire, France, where she discharged her cargo. She got back to Baltimore on 31 October.

After the Armistice of 11 November 1918 she loaded cargo at Newport News, Virginia. On 25 December 1918 she left Newport News and crossed the Atlantic to Le Verdon-sur-Mer, where she discharged her cargo. She then bunkered at Bassens, and on 3 February 1919 left to return to the US. En route one of her crew developed spinal meningitis, so on 21 February she stopped at Bermuda, where she and her crew were quarantined. She left Bermuda on 25 February and continued to Newport News.

From Newport News she continued to Baltimore, arriving on 5 March 1919. On 13 March she was decommissioned and returned to her owners.

On 13 May 1926 Howick Hall and the motor tanker Gulf of Venezuela collided in the Ambrose Channel. Howick Hall grounded on Roamer's Reef, but was only slightly damaged, and was refloated the same day.

== Dovenden ==
Howick Hall remained in US merchant service until October 1929, when the Exeter Shipping Co bought her, renamed her Dovenden and registered her in London. She kept her UK official number, but she was given the new code letters LFKH and four-letter call sign GQWN. The Great Depression caused a World slump in shipping, and she spent most of 1930 laid up. That October she went to Rotterdam, where she remained laid up for most of the next two years.

In 1932 she changed owners twice, passing first to the McAllum Steamship Co and then Lambert Brothers. In 1935 she again changed hands twice. That January, Halford Constant bought her for £7,500. Later that year he sold her to an Italian company, Ditta Luigi Pittaluga Vapori.

== Ircania ==
Ditta Luigi Pittaluga renamed her Ircania and registered her in Genoa. Her Italian code letters were IBLP. In the Second Italo-Ethiopian War she took supplies to Massawa. In 1937 she was acquired by the Società Anonima Cooperativa di Navigazione 'Garibaldi'. In June 1940 Ircania was in Port of Jacksonville, Florida when Italy entered the Second World War, so she remained in port.

On 30 March 1941 the United States Coast Guard detained Ircania in Jacksonville. On 5 May Judge Louie Strum, of the US District Court for the Southern District of Florida, convicted all 39 members of her crew of sabotaging their own ship. He also convicted her Captain, Nicola Marchese, and Chief Engineer, Feruccio Magni, of conspiracy. On 14 May, Strum sentenced Marchese and Magni to four years in prison and the 37 other crew members to two and a half years.

== Raceland ==
On 14 July 1941 the US Treasury announced that the United States Maritime Commission had bought four Italian merchant ships, including Ircania. The Commission renamed her Raceland and registered her in Panama. Her Panamanian call sign was HPYY.

On 31 December 1941 the Commission appointed the South Atlantic Steamship Company to manage Raceland. She loaded at Norfolk, Virginia and Boston, and then crossed the Atlantic in Convoy SC 69, which left Halifax, Nova Scotia on 10 February 1942 and reached Liverpool on 27 February.

Raceland may have detached from SC 69 before it reached Liverpool, as she proceeded to Loch Ewe on the west coast of Scotland to join Convoy PQ 13. On 10 March 1942, PQ 13 left Loch Ewe for Murmansk. Raceland had a crew of 45 men, made up of 12 nationalities. On 28 March, German aircraft attacked PQ 13 south of Bear Island. Raceland was sunk at position 72°40′N 020°20′E. Her crew launched all four of her lifeboats, and all 45 men safely abandoned ship.

On 29 March a storm sank the two smaller lifeboats, killing their occupants. This left 15 men in Lifeboat Number 1, commanded by Raceland's Chief Officer, Otto Hatlestad, and 18 in Lifeboat Number 2, commanded by Raceland's Second Officer, Johan Johansen.

After six days Hatlestad's boat reached Sørøya in the north of German-occupied Norway, but by then six of the men in her had died. A seventh died after reaching land. The survivors were taken to the Norwegian mainland and hospitalised. Three of the survivors were Norwegian. Two, including Hatlestad, gave a propaganda interview for a pro-German radio broadcast. Hatlestad later returned to sea, working for the Germans.

After 11 days Johansen's boat reached SørSandfjord, also in northern Norway. By then 13 of the men in her had died: variously from hypothermia, salt poisoning from drinking seawater, or suicide. The five survivors were suffering from frostbite, and most had to have digits or limbs amputated. The German authorities interned survivors in different camps, including two in Marlag und Milag Nord and one in Obermaßfeld.

== Bibliography ==
- Lloyd's Register of Shipping. Vol. I–Steamers. London: Lloyd's Register of Shipping. 1912 – via Internet Archive.
- Lloyd's Register of Shipping. Vol. I–Steamers. London: Lloyd's Register of Shipping. 1917 – via Internet Archive.
- Lloyd's Register of Shipping (PDF). Vol. II–Steamers & Motorships. London: Lloyd's Register of Shipping. 1936 – via Southampton City Council.
- Lloyd's Register of Shipping (PDF). Vol. II–Steamers and Motorships of 300 tons gross and over. London: Lloyd's Register of Shipping. 1942 – via Southampton City Council.
- The Marconi Press Agency Ltd (1918). The Year Book of Wireless Telegraphy and Telephony. London: The Wireless Press, Ltd.
- Mercantile Navy List. London. 1911 – via Crew List Index Project.
- Mercantile Navy List. London. 1931 – via Crew List Index Project.
