= USS Santa Rosalia =

Cargo steamship that served in the US Navy in World War I

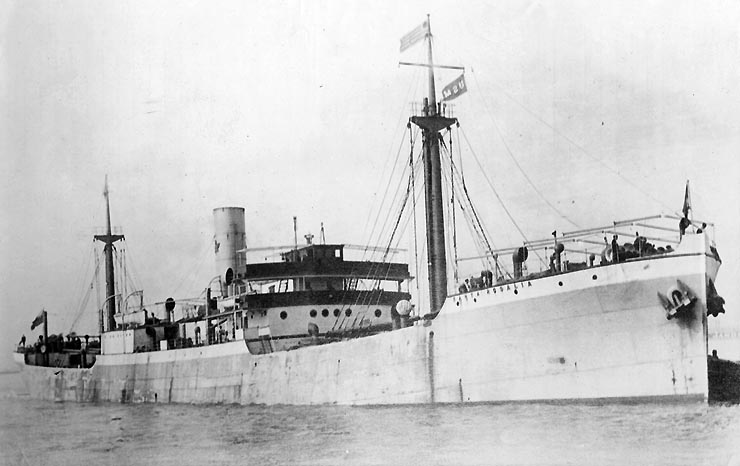
- Santa Rosalia between 1911 and 1914

History
- Name: 1911: Santa Rosalia; 1929: Stefanos Costomenis
- Owner: 1911: Isthmian Steamship Co; 1914: US Steel Products Co; 1920: Culucundis & Costomeni
- Operator: 1918: United States Navy
- Port of registry: 1911: (United Kingdom) London; 1914: (United States) New York; 1929: (Greece) Syra
- Builder: Wm Hamilton & Co, Port Glasgow
- Yard number: 220
- Launched: 21 September 1911
- Completed: October 1911
- Acquired: by US Navy, 20 May 1918
- Commissioned: by US Navy, 20 May 1918
- Decommissioned: by US Navy, 26 June 1919
- Identification: 1911: UK official number 132618; code letters HTPC; 1914: US official number 212569; code letters LDPN; 1918: pennant number ID-1503; call sign KLO; 1929: code letters JHGP; 1934: call sign SVMP
- Fate: sank, 18 February 1936

General characteristics
- Type: cargo ship
- Tonnage: 5,409 GRT, 3,488 NRT
- Displacement: 11,600 tons
- Length: 406.0 ft (123.7 m)
- Beam: 52.6 ft (16.0 m)
- Draught: 24 ft 7 in (7.49 m)
- Depth: 27.7 ft (8.4 m)
- Decks: 2
- Installed power: triple-expansion engine; 476 NHP, 2,700 ihp
- Propulsion: 1 × screw
- Speed: 10 knots (19 km/h)
- Armament: In US Navy service: 1 × 5-inch/51-caliber gun; 1 × 3-inch/50-caliber gun

USS Santa Rosalia (ID-1503) was a cargo steamship that was built in Scotland in 1910 and served in the merchant fleets of the United Kingdom, United States and Greece. She served in the United States Navy in 1918–19. She was renamed Stefanos Costomenis in 1929 and sank in the North Atlantic in 1936.

== Building and first owners ==
William Hamilton and Company built the ship in Port Glasgow on the River Clyde, launching her on 21 September 1911 and completing her that October. Her registered length was 406.0 ft (123.7 m), her beam was 52.6 ft (16.0 m) and her depth was 27.7 ft (8.4 m). Her tonnages were 5,409 GRT and 3,488 NRT.

She had a single screw, driven by three-cylinder triple-expansion steam engine that was rated at 476 NHP and gave her a speed of 10 knots (19 km/h).

Hamilton's launched Santa Rosalia for Lang & Fulton of Greenock, and ownership was to be shared between the Hamilton's and Lang & Fulton. But before she was completed, they sold her to the Isthmian Steamship Company, which was a British company founded in 1910 by the United States Steel Products Corporation.

Santa Rosalia was registered in London. Her United Kingdom official number was 132618, and her code letters were HTPC. By 1912 she was equipped for wireless telegraphy.

== US registry ==
When the First World War started in 1914, all of the Isthmian Steamship Co's ships were transferred to the direct ownership of its parent company in the then-neutral USA, and re-registered there. Santa Rosalia was re-registered in New York. Her US official number was 212569 and her code letters were LDPN. By 1918 her wireless telegraph call sign was KLO.

After the US entered World War I, the US Navy inspected Santa Rosalia in 1917 or 1918 for possible naval service. On 20 May 1918 the United States Shipping Board chartered her for the Navy. She was commissioned the same day at New Orleans as USS Santa Rosalia, with the Identification Number (ID) 1503. She was defensively armed with one 5-inch/51-caliber gun and one 3-inch/50-caliber gun.

She made four trips for the Naval Overseas Transportation Service: two to France before the Armistice of 11 November 1918 and two afterward to Uruguay, one of which included a visit to the United States Virgin Islands. After being commissioned, Santa Rosalia went from New Orleans to Hampton Roads, Virginia, where she loaded United States Army general supplies. She left in convoy on 19 June 1918, reached Brest, France on 9 July, and continued to Gironde to discharge her cargo. She left France on 3 August and reached Baltimore, Maryland on 20 August.

On 26 August 1918 Santa Rosalia left Baltimore for New York for repairs. Early in October 1918 she left Norfolk, Virginia in convoy. She reached Brest on 28 October, and continued to Saint-Nazaire. She was in St-Nazaire on 11 November when the Armistice was signed. She feft on 14 November, and reached Baltimore on 5 December.

After transferring from a US Army to a US Shipping Board account, she went to New York to load a cargo of general supplies. She left on 19 January 1919, and reached Saint Thomas, U.S. Virgin Islands on 25 January. She left on 27 January, and reached Montevideo, Uruguay on 18 February. She unloaded and loaded cargo, and then returned to New York.

From New York, Santa Rosalia made a second trip to Montevideo, returning on 6 June 1919. She was still in New York on 26 June when she was decommissioned, returned to her owners, and resumed civilian merchant trade.

== Stefanos Costomenis ==
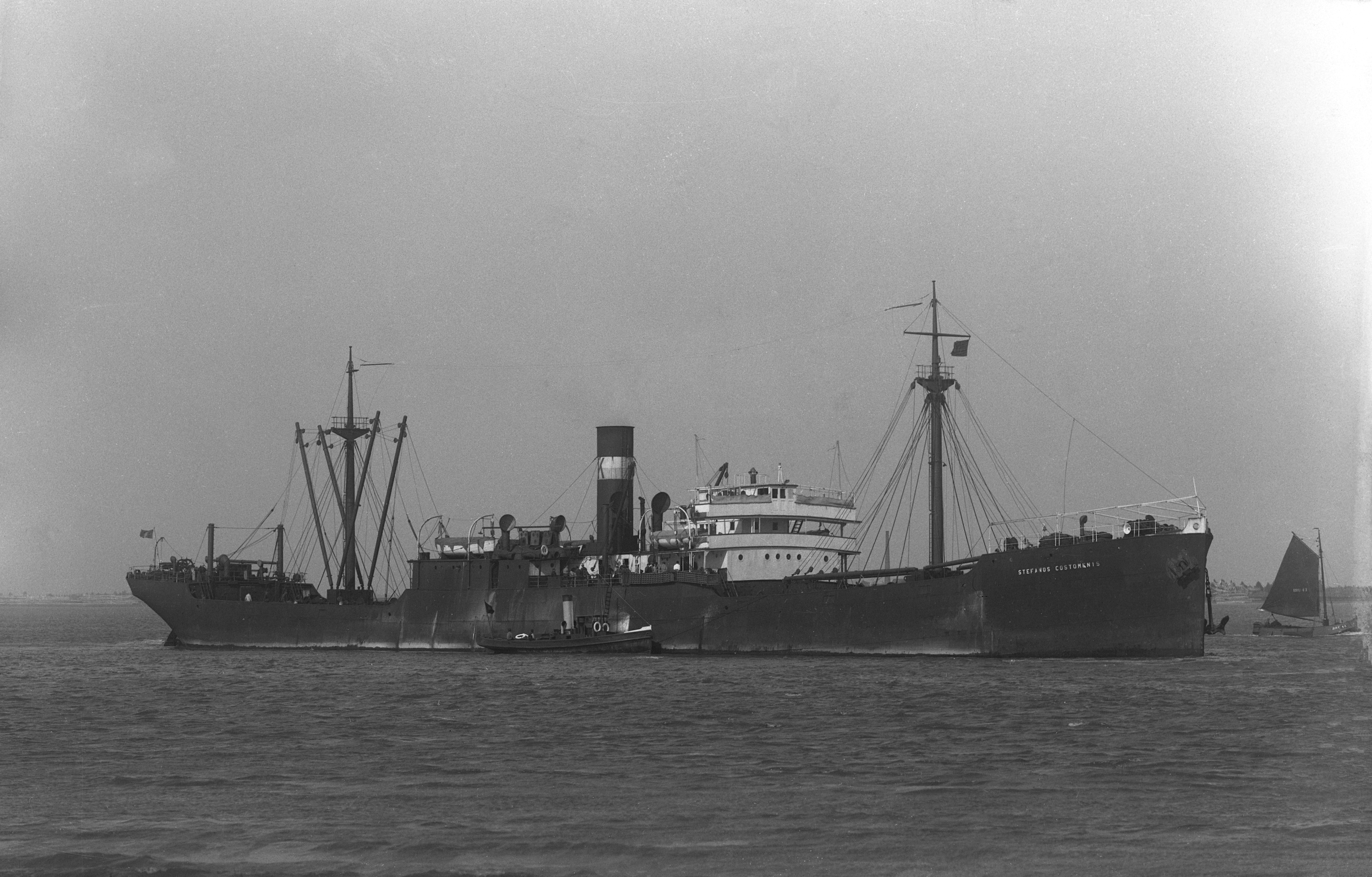
Stefanos Costomenis, between 1929 and 1936

In 1929 two Greek shipowners, Elias G Culucundis & Stephen C Costomeni, bought the ship, renamed her Stefanos Costomenis, and registered her in Syra. Her Greek code letters were JHGP. By 1934 her four-letter call sign was SVMP.

In February 1936 Stefanos Costomenis left Tampa for Rotterdam with a cargo of phosphate. She ran into a heavy sea, and on the evening of 17 February her wireless telegraph operator sent a distress signal stating that she was about 180 nautical miles (330 km) east of the Nantucket Light ship, leaking, and needing assistance. The Baltimore Mail Steamship Co's ship City of Newport News changed course to assist, but Stefanos Costomenis did not heave-to await assistance. The Greek steamship was about 500 nautical miles (930 km) east of Cape Henry when City of Newport News caught up with her on 18 February. Stefanos Costomenis was abandoned at position 37°43′N 66°03′W and all 33 of her crew were safely transferred to City of Newport News, which then set course for Norfolk, Virginia.

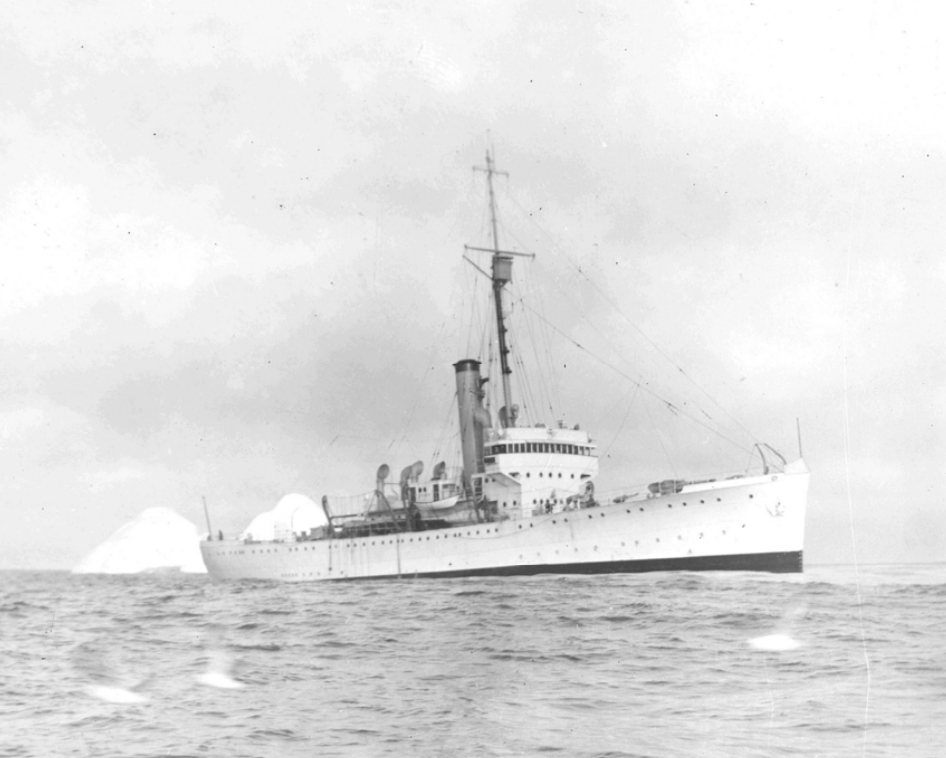
USCGC Champlain searched for Stefanos Costomenis after she was abandoned.

Stefanos Costomenis was left unmanned but afloat, which made her a shipping hazard. The United States Coast Guard sent USCGC Champlain to the Greek ship's last known position, ready to sink her if necessary. But Champlain did not find her, and it is presumed Stefanos Costomenis had foundered.

== Bibliography ==
- Lloyd's Register of Shipping. Vol. I–Steamers. London: Lloyd's Register of Shipping. 1912 – via Internet Archive.
- Lloyd's Register of Shipping. Vol. I–Steamers. London: Lloyd's Register of Shipping. 1914 – via Internet Archive.
- Lloyd's Register of Shipping (PDF). Vol. II–Steamers & Motorships. London: Lloyd's Register of Shipping. 1930 – via Southampton City Council.
- Lloyd's Register of Shipping (PDF). Vol. II–Steamers and Motorships of 300 tons gross and over. London: Lloyd's Register of Shipping. 1934 – via Southampton City Council.
- The Marconi Press Agency Ltd (1918). The Year Book of Wireless Telegraphy and Telephony. London: The Wireless Press, Ltd.
- Mercantile Navy List. London. 1913 – via Crew List Index Project.
