= SS Mount Ida =

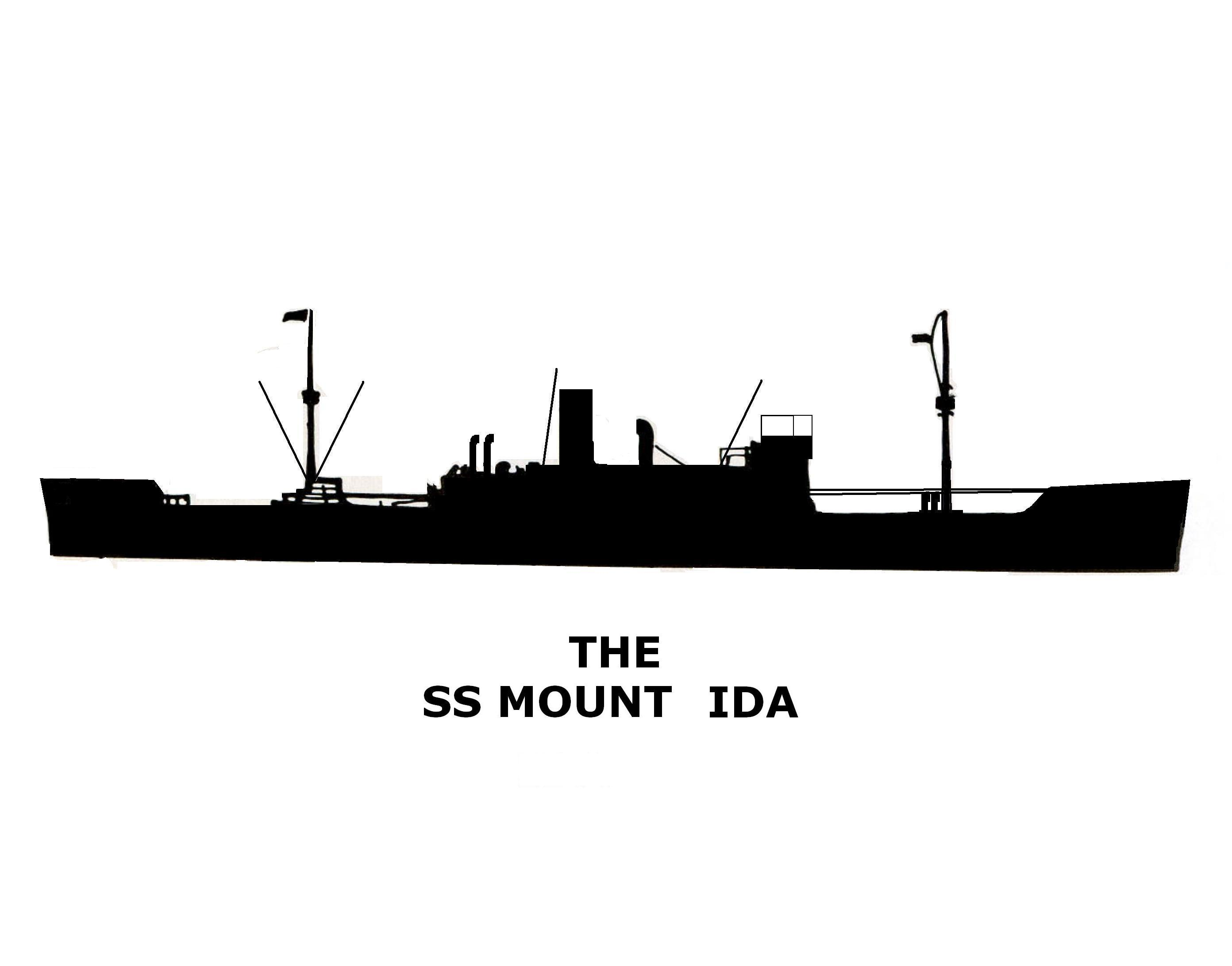

History
- Name: SS Arcscott; SS Mount Ida
- Namesake: either Mount Ida (Crete); or Mount Ida (Turkey)
- Owner: Atlanticos Steam Ship Co Ltd and others
- Operator: Rethymnis & Kulukundis, London
- Port of registry: Piraeus, Greece
- Builder: William Hamilton & Co. Ltd
- Launched: 4 February 1938
- Maiden voyage: 1938
- Identification: Code Letters SVXH
- Fate: Wrecked 9 October 1939 off Norfolk, England

General characteristics
- Type: Cargo ship
- Tonnage: 4,202 GRT; 3,840 tonnage under deck; 2,475 NRT
- Length: 380.5 ft (116.0 m)
- Beam: 56.2 ft (17.1 m)
- Depth: 23.5 ft (7.2 m)
- Installed power: 380 NHP
- Propulsion: 3-cylinder triple expansion steam engine; single screw
- Speed: 10.5 knots (19.4 km/h; 12.1 mph)
- Crew: 29

The SS Mount Ida was a cargo ship built in 1938 by William Hamilton & Co. Ltd of Glasgow. Launched in 1938 as Arcscott, she was renamed Mount Ida after being bought by the Atlanticos Steam Ship Company Ltd, of Athens, Greece. She was wrecked in 1939 after being in service for only about 18 months.

== Propulsion ==
Mount Ida had eight corrugated furnaces with a combined grate area of 143 square feet (13 m^{2}) that heated two 220 psi (1,500 kPa) single-ended boilers with a combined heating surface of 5,742 square feet (533 m^{2}). She had also an auxiliary boiler. The boilers fed a three-cylinder triple expansion steam engine rated at 380 nominal horsepower that was built by David Rowan & Co Ltd, Glasgow. Mount Ida's service speed was about 10.5 knots (19.4 km/h; 12.1 mph).

== Final voyage ==
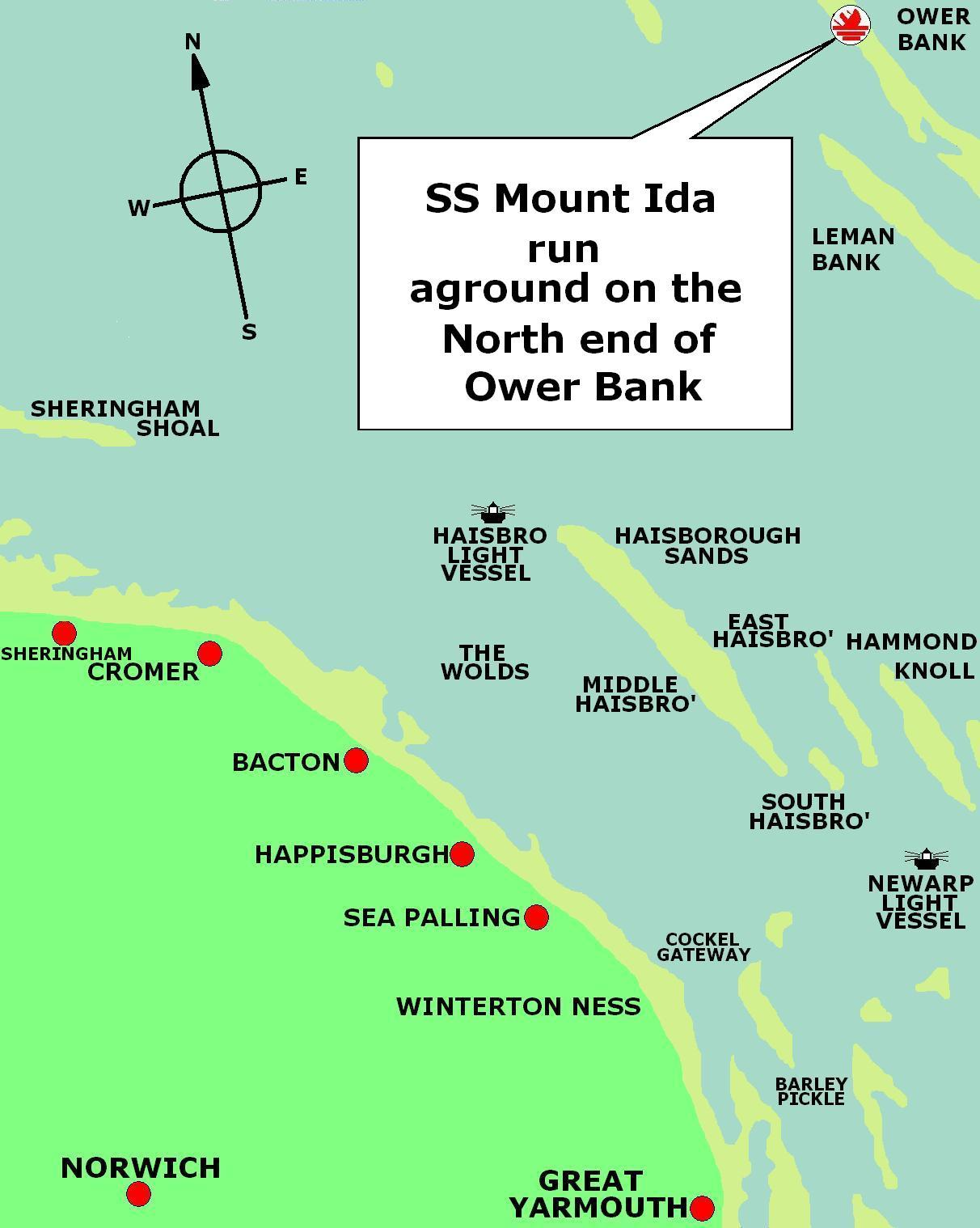
Position of Mount Ida's wreck on Ower Bank

In the autumn of 1939 Mount Ida, carrying a cargo of grain and timber, and with a crew of 29, left Vancouver, British Columbia, Canada, bound for the port of Leith, Scotland. On 9 October she was in the North Sea and close to the north-east coast of Norfolk, England. This is a particularly hazardous area, with many sand banks.

Despite being equipped with direction finding equipment and an echo sounding device Mount Ida ran aground on a sandbank. At 0625 hrs the coastguard told the coxswain of the Cromer lifeboat, Henry Blogg, that the Mount Ida was aground and asked that the lifeboat be sent to assist her. Since the outbreak of the Second World War a month earlier, RNLI lifeboats had been under the control of the naval authorities, and this was only the second rescue effort by the Cromer lifeboat under this arrangement.

The Cromer lifeboat H.F. Bailey was launched and set off towards Haisborough Sands, which is where Coxswain Blogg had been told the Mount Ida was aground. The lifeboat had been at sea for an hour when the coastguard informed Blogg by radio that Mount Ida was not on Haisborough Sands but was grounded 19 miles (31 km) further north-east, on Ower Bank.

The H.F. Bailey crossed Leman Bank and reached the Mount Ida around 1230 hrs. By this time the ship's starboard lifeboat had been carried away, she was listing heavily to starboard and lying head on to the seas, and her position offered no lee for the lifeboat to come alongside. The H.F. Bailey made an attempt to throw a line to the stricken vessel but was twice struck by the heavy seas and flung back. Coxswain Blogg made another attempt to come alongside, before deciding that it was too dangerous and that he would have to wait for the sea to slacken.

By 1415 hrs conditions had improved and Blogg, using the lifeboat's powerful engines with great skill, was able to maintain a steady position alongside the ship for over an hour. During this time all 29 crewmen were brought off successfully, though one suffered crushed legs when he hesitated to descend the rope ladder and was trapped between the lifeboat and the Mount Ida; he later died of his injuries in Cromer Hospital.

During the rescue, the lifeboat was continually flung against the hull of the Mount Ida. Because the H F Bailey was badly damaged, Cromer's no 2 lifeboat, Harriot Dixon, was called out to bring the rescued men ashore. The Harriot Dixon, too, was damaged as it was launched into heavy seas, but the rescue effort was successful.

The Mount Ida was never salvaged and slowly sank into the sands of Ower Bank. Her position was 53°10′44″N 1°55′46″E.

Position of Mount Ida's wreck in the North Sea

== Sources ==
- Jolly, Cyril (1981). The Loss of the English Trader. Cambridge: Acorn Editions. ISBN 0-906554-06-3.
- Jolly, Cyril (2002). Henry Blogg, the Greatest of the Lifeboatmen. Cromer: Poppyland Publishing. ISBN 0-946148-59-7.
- Leach, Nicholas; Russell, Paul (2004). Cromer Lifeboats 1804–2004. Stroud: Tempus Publishing. ISBN 0-7524-3197-8.
- Tikus, Ayer (2004). The Ship-wrecks off North East Norfolk. Ayer Tikus Publications.
