= Coot (trawler) =

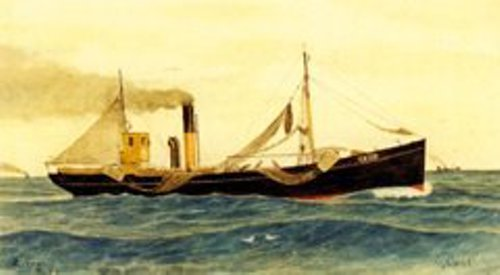
- Coot, painted by Bjarni Sæmundsson

History
- Name: Coot
- Owner: William & John Hamilton
- Port of registry: Port Glasgow United Kingdom
- Builder: William H. Hamilton & Co., Glasgow
- Completed: 1892
- Identification: GK 310
- Owner: Fiskveiðihlutafélag Faxaflóa
- Port of registry: Hafnarfjörður Iceland
- In service: Operated from Hafnarfjörður between 1905 and 1908
- Fate: Wrecked 14 December 1908

General characteristics
- Type: Trawler
- Propulsion: Steam engine

Coot was a steel fishing vessel, built in Scotland in 1892, which became the first Icelandic steam trawler in 1905. After a short but profitable service it was wrecked in Iceland in 1908.

== Construction ==
Coot was built in 1892 at Port Glasgow, then in the county of Renfrewshire, by William Hamilton & Co as Yard No. 87. It was measured as 142 GRT and 44 NRT. Overall length was 100.2 feet (30.5 m), beam 20.5 feet (6.2 m) and depth 10.6 feet (3.2 m). The trawler was powered by a triple expansion steam engine of 45 NHP and 225 IHP, made by David Rowan & Son, Glasgow, driving a single screw propeller and with a service speed of 10 knots (19 km/h).

The trawler was launched on 9 September 1892, completed the following month, then registered at Port Glasgow with official number 93937.

== Fishing service ==
Coot was built for the Port Glasgow-based fishing fleet of its builder, and registered to the ownership of William and John Hamilton with fishery number PGW39.

=== Iceland ===
Prior to the arrival of Coot there had attempts by various foreign-owned companies to run trawling fleets off Iceland but these had not proved commercially successful. An English fisherman from Devon, Mr. Pike Ward, registered the trawler Utopia in Iceland, but it was not a commercial success due to what might be termed "alcohol related human capital problems".

The Coot (GK 310) operated from Hafnarfjörður between 1905 and 1908. It was owned by Icelandic entrepreneurs who founded fishing business Fiskveiðihlutafélag Faxaflóa. It was driven by a steam engine and fished using a trawl.

== Loss ==
On 14 December 1908, Coot sailed on a fishing trip, with another fishing vessel, Kópanes, in tow. In the evening, Kopanes damaged the propeller of Coot and both vessels drifted ashore on Vatnsleysuströnd at Keilisnes, about 5 miles west of Hafnarfjörður, becoming wrecks.

The ship's boiler is preserved in Hafnarfjörður, beside Reykjavíkurvegur, near the junction with Strandgata and Vesturgata.

== Commemoration ==
A painting of Coot was used as a design for a stamp issued in March 2004. The stamp bears the title Fyrsti Togarinn Á Íslandi, Coot 1904 and its value, 50.00.
