= German submarine UD-5 =

German World War II submarine

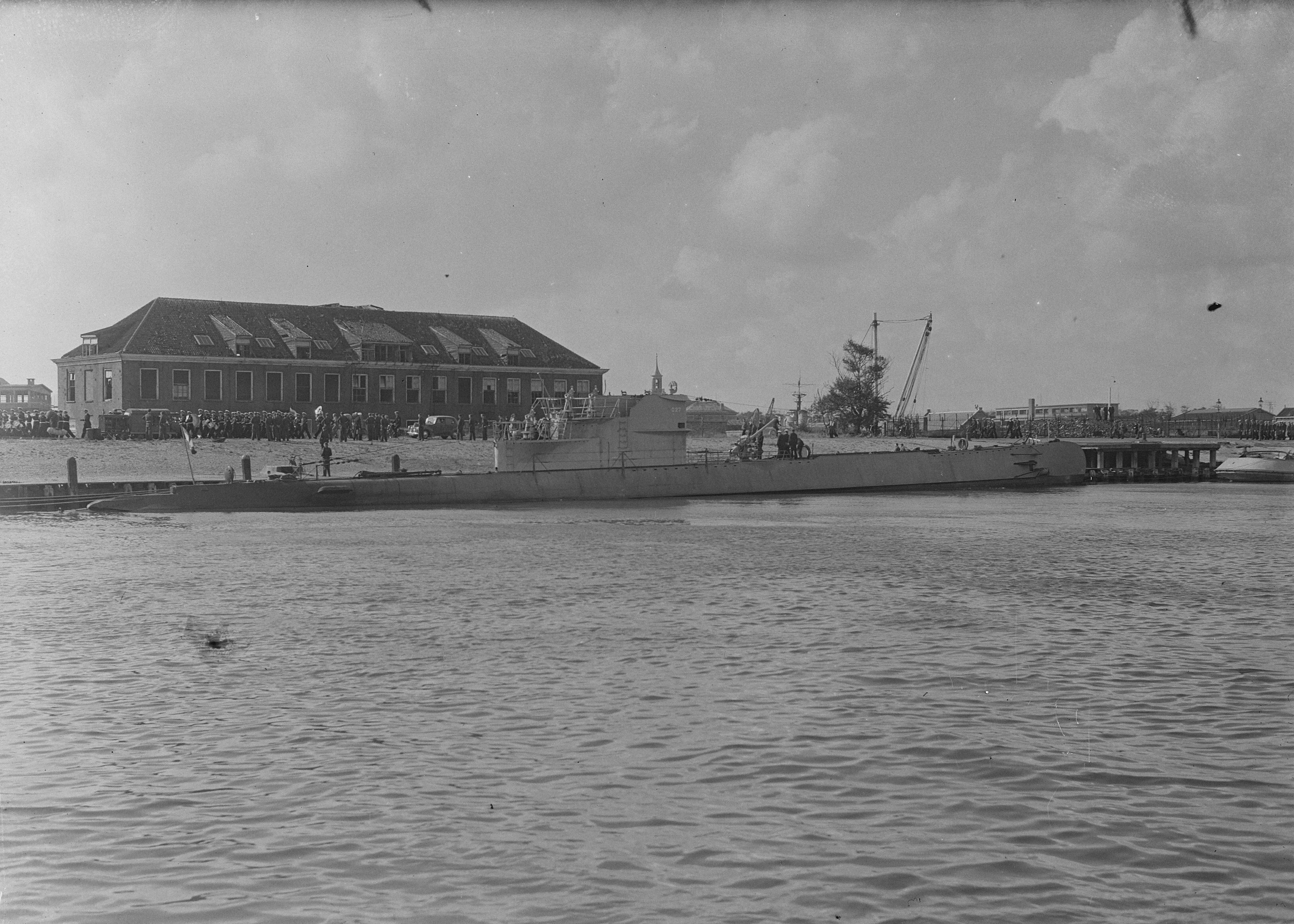
- HNLMS O 27 in 1949

History

Netherlands
- Name: HNLMS O 27
- Ordered: 8 July 1938
- Builder: Rotterdamsche Droogdok Maatschappij, Rotterdam
- Yard number: RDM-210
- Laid down: 3 August 1939
- Fate: Incomplete, captured by German on 14 May 1940

Nazi Germany
- Name: UD-5
- Launched: 26 September 1941
- Commissioned: 30 January 1942
- Fate: Surrendered on 9 May 1945, returned to the Dutch Navy

Netherlands
- Name: HNLMS O 27
- Commissioned: 13 July 1945
- Stricken: 14 November 1959
- Fate: Broken up in 1961

General characteristics
- Class & type: O 21-class submarine
- Displacement: 990 tons surfaced; 1205 tons submerged
- Length: 77.70 m (254 ft 11 in)
- Beam: 6.80 m (22 ft 4 in)
- Draught: 3.95 m (13 ft 0 in)
- Propulsion: 2 × 2,500 PS (2,466 bhp; 1,839 kW) diesel engines; 2 × 500 PS (493 bhp; 368 kW) electric motors
- Speed: 19.5 knots (36.1 km/h; 22.4 mph) surfaced; 9 knots (17 km/h; 10 mph) submerged
- Range: 10,000 nmi (19,000 km; 12,000 mi) at 12 knots (22 km/h; 14 mph) surfaced; 28 nmi (52 km; 32 mi) at 8.5 knots (15.7 km/h; 9.8 mph) submerged
- Complement: 39
- Armament: 4 × 21 in (533 mm) bow torpedo tubes; 2 × 21 in stern torpedo tubes; 2 × 21 in (1×2) external-traversing TT amidships

Service record as UD-5
- Part of: 5th U-boat Flotilla November 1941 – August 1942; 10th U-boat Flotilla August 1942 – January 1943; U-boat Defense School January 1943 – May 1945
- Identification codes: M 36 894
- Commanders: F.Kapt. / Kapt.z.S. Bruno Mahn 1 November 1941 – 12 January 1943; Oblt.z.S. Klaus-Dietrich König (acting) 16 December 1942 – 9 January 1943; Kptlt. Horst-Tessen von Kameke 13 January – 22 February 1943; Kptlt. Hans-Ulrich Scheltz 23 February 1943 – 9 May 1945
- Operations: 2 patrols
- Victories: 1 merchant ship sunk (7,628 GRT)

UD-5 was an O 21-class submarine. The boat was laid down as the Dutch submarine HNLMS K XXVII and renamed HNLMS O 27 but was captured during the German invasion of the Netherlands in World War II and commissioned in the Kriegsmarine. The ship survived the war and was returned to the Netherlands where she served under her old name until 1959.

== Ship history ==
The submarine was ordered on 8 July 1938 and laid down on 3 August 1939 as K XXVII at the Rotterdamsche Droogdok Maatschappij, Rotterdam. During construction she was renamed O 27. Following the German invasion of 10 May 1940, the not yet launched O 27 was captured at the yard by the invading forces.

The Germans decided to complete her. The launch took place on 26 September 1941. She served in the Kriegsmarine as UD-5 and was commissioned on 30 January 1942.

From November 1941 to August 1942, UD-5 served as training boat in Kiel when attached to the 5th Flotilla. From August 1942 until January 1943, the boat was stationed at Lorient in occupied France and attached to the 10th Flotilla.

When patrolling west of Freetown, UD-5 spotted and sunk the 7,628 GRT British freighter Primrose Hill on 29 October 1942.

In January 1943, the boat was transferred to Bergen in occupied Norway and attached to the U-boot Abwehr Schule to be used as school boat until May 1945. UD-5 surrendered on 9 May 1945. UD-5 was planned to be scuttled as part of Operation Deadlight but was recognized on 13 July 1915 as a former Dutch boat and was returned to the Royal Netherlands Navy. On 13 July 1945, she was commissioned in the Dutch Navy as O 27.

In 1954 a digital fire control system called VUTOR was successfully tested on board the O 27 near Torquay.

She served in the Dutch navy until she was stricken on 14 November 1959. She was stationed in Den Helder where she served as torpedo trial boat, piggy boat and training vessel. In 1961, she was broken up.

== Summary of raiding history ==
Date	Ship Name	Nationality	Tonnage (GRT)	Fate
29 October 1942	Primrose Hill	United Kingdom	7,628	Sunk

== Bibliography ==
- Busch, Rainer; Röll, Hans-Joachim (1999). German U-boat commanders of World War II: a biographical dictionary. Translated by Brooks, Geoffrey. London, Annapolis, Md: Greenhill Books, Naval Institute Press. ISBN 978-1-55750-186-8.
- Gröner, Erich; Jung, Dieter; Maass, Martin (1991). U-boats and Mine Warfare Vessels. German Warships 1815–1945. Vol. 2. Translated by Thomas, Keith; Magowan, Rachel. London: Conway Maritime Press. ISBN 978-0-85177-593-7.
