= USS Craster Hall =

Cargo steamship that served in the United States Navy

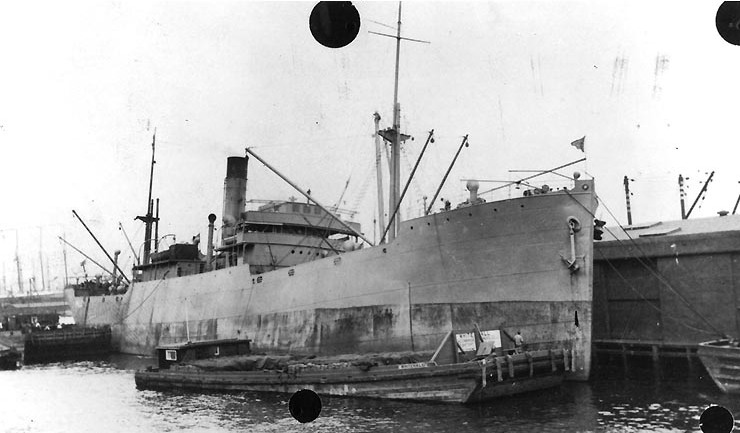
- Craster Hall in civilian service between 1909 and 1918

History
- Name: Craster Hall
- Owner: 1909: CG Dunn & Co; 1914: US Steel Products Co.
- Operator: 1918: United States Navy
- Port of registry: 1909: (United Kingdom) Liverpool; 1914: (United States) New York
- Builder: Wm Hamilton & Co, Port Glasgow
- Yard number: 203
- Launched: 4 February 1909
- Completed: May 1909
- Acquired: for US Navy, 25 April 1918
- Commissioned: by US Navy, 9 May 1918
- Decommissioned: by US Navy, 5 February 1919
- Identification: 1909: UK official number 127964; code letters HNRD; 1914: US official number 212886; code letters LDQC; 1918: pennant number ID-1496; call sign KLK
- Fate: beached after collision, 1927

General characteristics
- Type: cargo ship
- Tonnage: 4,319 GRT, 2,759 NRT
- Displacement: 9,700 tons
- Length: 380.0 ft (115.8 m)
- Beam: 50.0 ft (15.2 m)
- Draft: 24 ft 0 in (7.32 m)
- Depth: 26.2 ft (8.0 m)
- Installed power: 414 NHP, 2,200 ihp
- Propulsion: triple-expansion engine
- Speed: 11 knots (20 km/h)
- Complement: in US Navy service: 62
- Armament: 1 × 5-inch/51-caliber gun; 1 × 6-pounder gun

USS Craster Hall (ID-1486) was a cargo steamship that was built in Scotland in 1909 and served in the merchant fleets of first the United Kingdom and then the United States. From 1918 to 1919, she served in the United States Navy. In 1927, she was damaged in a collision off the coast of Peru, was beached to prevent her sinking, but was wrecked.

== Building and first owner ==
William Hamilton and Company built the ship in Port Glasgow on the River Clyde, launching her on 4 February 1909. Her registered length was 380.0 ft (115.8 m), her beam was 50.0 ft (15.2 m) and her depth was 26.2 ft (8.0 m). Her tonnages were 4,319 GRT and 2,759 NRT.

She had a single screw, driven by three-cylinder triple-expansion steam engine that was rated at 414 NHP and gave her a speed of 11 knots (20 km/h).

The ship's first owners were Charles G Dunn and Company of Liverpool, who named their ships after English country houses whose name ended in "Hall". "Craster Hall" may refer to Dunstan Hall in the parish of Craster in Northumberland. Dunn & Co registered her at Liverpool. Her United Kingdom official number was 127964, and her code letters were HNRD.

== US ownership ==
In 1914, the United States Steel Products Co bought three of CG Dunn's ships: Charlton Hall, Craster Hall and Crofton Hall, and registered them in New York. Craster Hall's US official number was 212886 and her code letters were LDQC. By 1917, she was equipped for wireless telegraphy. By 1918 her call sign was KLK.

On 25 April 1918, the United States Shipping Board transferred Craster Hall to the US Navy. On 9 May, she was commissioned as USS Craster Hall, with the Identification Number (ID) 1486. She was defensively armed with one 5-inch/51-caliber gun and one 6-pounder gun.

Between 25 May 1918 and 7 January 1919 Craster Hall made three voyages from the US to France with the Naval Overseas Transportation Service. She took steel billets, mail, flatcars, Army trucks, engines and airplanes to Bordeaux and Le Verdon-sur-Mer, Army supplies to Quiberon, Saint-Nazaire, and Nantes, and 353 horses to Pauillac. On 5 February 1919, the Navy decommissioned Craster Hall and returned her via the Shipping Board to her owners.

On 27 June 1927 Craster Hall was involved in a collision with Imperial Oil's motor tanker Reginolite off the coast of Peru, and was beached at Talara Point.

== Bibliography ==
- Lloyd's Register of British and Foreign Shipping. Vol. I–Steamers. London: Lloyd's Register of Shipping. 1910 – via Internet Archive.
- Lloyd's Register of Shipping. Vol. I–Steamers. London: Lloyd's Register of Shipping. 1914 – via Internet Archive.
- Lloyd's Register of Shipping. Vol. I–Steamers. London: Lloyd's Register of Shipping. 1917 – via Internet Archive.
- The Marconi Press Agency Ltd (1918). The Year Book of Wireless Telegraphy and Telephony. London: The Wireless Press, Ltd.
- Mercantile Navy List. London. 1911 – via Crew List Index Project.
