= William Hamilton and Company =

William Hamilton and Company was a British shipyard in Port Glasgow, Scotland. The company was bought by Lithgows Ltd., which later became Scott Lithgow and was nationalised as part of British Shipbuilders in 1977.

During the Second World War the company built several vessels for the Royal Navy, including Bangor-class minesweepers.

Hamiltons built the Pacific Star for the Booth Steamship Company Ltd, which was leased to the Blue Star Line as Blue Star's only tanker.

Some of the merchant ships that Hamiltons built in the Second World War were armed as CAM ships, including SS Michael E and SS Primrose Hill.

== Ships built by William Hamilton Co Ltd ==
Khoula F, originally Empire Trumpet, has been aground on Kish Island, Iran since 1966

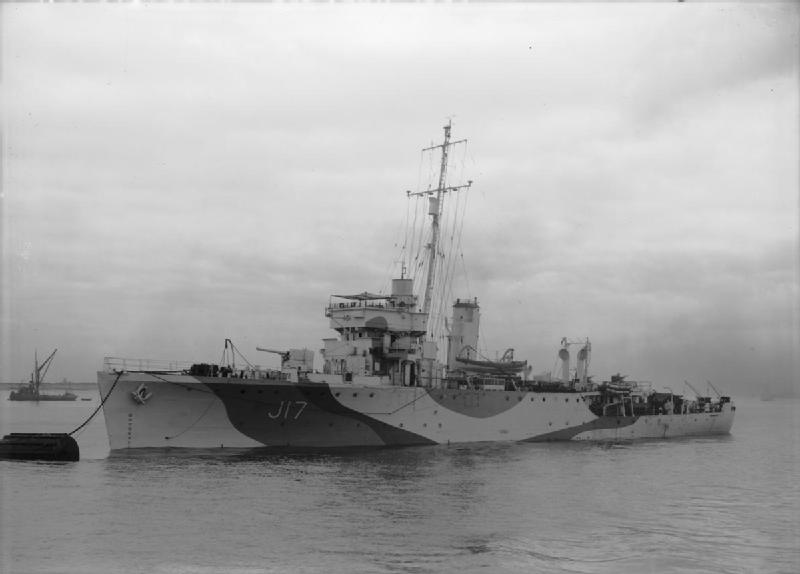
Halcyon-class minesweeper HMS Speedy in 1944

Ship	Launched	Fate
SS Acacia	1879	Sank after collision 1903
SV Ada Melmore	1877	Sank after collision 1887
SS Adato	1899	Sank 1909
MS Agamemnon	1946	Sank after catching fire, 1969
MV Alaunia	1960	Stricken 1993
SS Alice Taylor	1891	Sank 1918
Altair	1916	deleted 1940
MV Andania	1959	Scrapped 1986
SS Andoni	1898	Sunk by torpedo 1917
SS Annapolis	1911	Sunk by torpedo 1917
Antares	1916	deleted 1936
SS Ashantian	1935	Sunk by torpedo 1943
MV Athelduchess	1929	Wrecked 1943,
MV Athelempress	1930	Sunk by torpedo 1942
MV Athelmonarch	1928	Sunk by torpedo U-97, 1943
MV Athelprincess	1923	Sunk by torpedo 1943
MV Athelsultan	1929	Sunk by torpedo 1942
RFA Bacchus	1915	Sunk as a target ship, 1938
MV Baron Dalmeny	1924	Scrapped 1960
SS British Holly	1917	Scrapped 1931
SS British Officer	1955	Scrapped 1977
SS Cara	1905	Sunk by torpedo 18 Feb 1942 by U-432
HMIS Carnatic	1942	Scrapped 1949
SS Charlton Hall	1907	Scrapped 1934
SS Clan Matheson	1919	Scuttled 1955
SS Coot	1892	Wrecked 1908
SS Crofton Hall	1913	Scrapped 1957
SS Craigoswald	1899	Wrecked on the Low Lee rocks, Mount's Bay, Cornwall, 1911
SS Craster Hall	1909	Wrecked 1927
SV David Morgan	1891	Lost 1898
SS Empire Call	1944	Grounded and wrecked, 1945
SS Empire Swordsman	1944	Scrapped 1968
SS Empire Trumpet	1943	Ran aground on Kish Island, Iran, 1966
SV Fitzjames	1902	1909-1929 Renamed Pinnas F. Laeisz, lost on Sea
HMS Gossamer	1937	Sunk 1942
SV Hans	1904	Scrapped 1948
SS Hardwicke Grange	1921	Sunk by torpedo 12 June 1942 by U-129
SS Heathercliff	1883	Sank 1894
SS Howick Hall	1910	Sunk 1942
SS Hyndford	1905	Scrapped 1930
HMS Ilfracombe	1941	Scrapped 1948
SS Kerkenna	1900	Scrapped 1963
HMIS Khyber	1942	Scrapped 1949
SS Kingston Hill	1940	Sunk by enemy action, 1941
HMIS Kumaon	1942	Scrapped 1949
SV Kurt	1904	Renamed Moshulu. Preserved as a restaurant in Philadelphia
MV Limerick	1925	Sunk by torpedo 1943
HMS Llandudno	1941	Scrapped 1952
SS Lulworth Hill	1940	Sunk by enemy action, 1943
MV Lycia	1954	Scrapped 1977
HMS Lychnis	1917	Transferred to the Royal Indian Navy in 1921 as HMIS Cornwallis
SS Macassa	1888	Sank 1928
SS Marietta E	1940	Sunk by enemy action, 1943
HMS Melton	1916	Scrapped 1951
SS Michael E	1941	Sunk by enemy action on maiden voyage, 1941
SS Minerva	1909	Sunk by a mine, 1945
SS Mount Ida	1938	Grounded and wrecked in the North Sea off Norfolk, 1939
Nerissa	1926	Sunk by torpedo 1 May 1941 by U-552
HMS Nigella	1916	Sold 1921
MV Nordenes	1956	Scrapped 1981
HMS P13	1916	Scrapped 1923
HMS P38	1917	Scrapped 1937
HMS P57	1917	Sold to Egypt 1920, renamed El Raqib
HMS P58	1917	Scrapped 1921
MV Pacific Star	1954	Scrapped 1973
HMS Pansy	1916	Scrapped 1920
HMS Pelargonium	1918	Sold May 1921
SS Primrose Hill	1941	Sunk by enemy action, 1942
HMS Prince Rupert	1915	Scrapped 1923
HMIS Rohilkand	1942	Scrapped 1963
HMS Rothesay	1941	Scrapped 1950
SS Saint Bernard	1939	Sank 1967
SS Santa Rosalia	1911	Foundered 1936
HMS Speedwell	1935	Scrapped 1954
HMS Speedy	1938	Scrapped 1957
HMS Sphinx	1939	Bombed and wrecked 1940
SS Strathbeg	1909	Bombed and sunk 1944
SS Strathgarry	1907	Sunk by torpedo 1917
HMS Tarantella	1917	Sold for commercial use 1921
HMS Tenby	1941	Scrapped 1948
MV Trecarrell	1959	Sank after explosion 1979
MV Valverda	1934	Renamed Alfred Olsen. Sunk by torpedo 1941
SS Waitemata	1908	Sunk by torpedo 1918
SS Westfalia	1882	Sunk 1889
SV Falkirk	1896	Scrapped 1924
SS Zara	1897	Sunk by torpedo 1917

William Hamilton also built a floating dock for Surabaya in 1912.
