= SS Wiltshire =

British steamship (1911–1922)

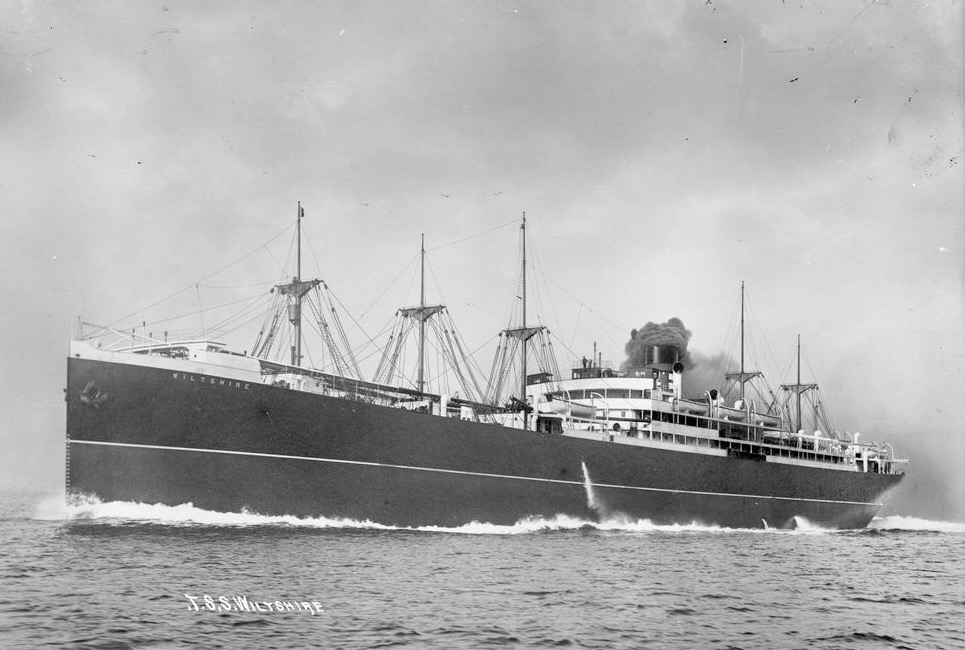
- Wiltshire at Sydney

History
- Name: Wiltshire (1912–1922)
- Owner: Federal Steam Navigation Company
- Builder: John Brown & Company, Clydebank
- Yard number: 401
- Launched: 19 December 1911
- Completed: 15 February 1912
- Identification: Official number 132675
- Fate: Ran aground in 1922

General characteristics
- Type: Passenger ship
- Tonnage: 12,160 gross register tons (GRT); 6,598 net register tons (NRT)
- Length: 526.5 ft (160.5 m)
- Beam: 61.4 ft (18.7 m)
- Depth: 33.3 ft (10.1 m)
- Installed power: 6,500 hp (4,800 kW)
- Propulsion: 2 x quadruple-expansion steam turbines, twin screw
- Speed: 14 kn (26 km/h; 16 mph)
- Crew: 103

SS Wiltshire was a passenger ship built for the Federal Steam Navigation Company by John Brown's of Clydebank in 1912 to run between Britain, Australia and New Zealand. She was wrecked when she ran aground in 1922.

== Description ==
Wiltshire was a sister ship of Argyllshire (1911–1936) and Shropshire (1911–1940), built a few months earlier. She had three main decks, four insulated holds (10,618 m^{3} (375,000 cu ft) refrigerated), 117 first-class berths and three- and four-berth cabins for 130 first-class and 270 emigrant passengers. Four boilers, for two sets of inverted surface condensing, quadruple expansion engines powered her maiden voyage from Liverpool to Melbourne, between 17 March and 27 April 1912 (35 days 17½ hours), via Cape Town (for coal), at an average of 13.5 knots (25.0 km/h; 15.5 mph).

== Career ==
Wiltshire served Sydney for Federal, Huddart and Shire Lines, Bristol, Liverpool, Manchester and Wellington as a Federal and Shire Lines ship, though she was also advertised as running for the parent company, New Zealand Shipping. In 1913, she was fitted with two guns in an Admiralty scheme to protect food carrying ships. In December 1913, a collision with a ship, whilst docking in Liverpool, required 3 months of repairs, replacing 10 plates, a propeller and a shaft. From 7 September 1914 to 27 December 1917 Wiltshire was requisitioned as Australian Expeditionary Force transport A18, carrying 36 officers, 720 troops and 505 horses. She was in the first convoy which assembled in King George's Sound in October 1914, taking Australian and New Zealand forces to Europe. Then, until 5 September 1919, she was managed by the Liner Requisition Scheme. She finished her war service by bringing troops back from Egypt to Wellington in January 1919.

== Wreck ==
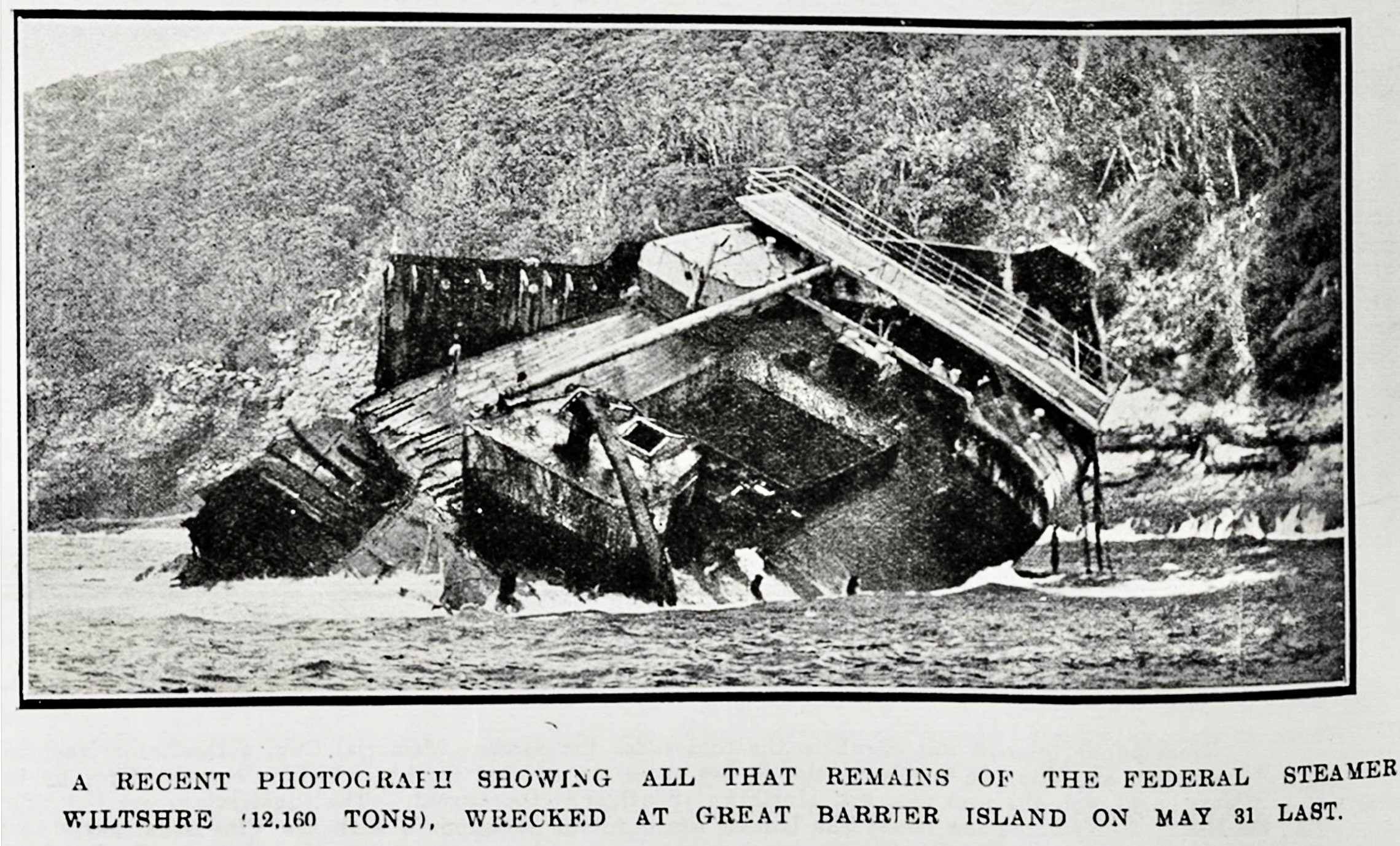
Wiltshire in 1923

Wiltshire was wrecked in Rosalie Bay, Great Barrier Island, about 3 km (1.9 mi) from the southernmost point at Cape Barrier, on 31 May 1922. About 10,000 tons of cargo was aboard, including household goods, metals, clothing, building materials, motor cars, whisky, tobacco, equipment for Pukekohe power station and two NZR A^{B} class locomotives. The need to replace the lost equipment delayed the work of building the Midland Line and Waikokopu railways. She was also carrying 461 bags of parcel-mail from London, of which 94 were rescued, as well as mail from Cristóbal and Liverpool.

On her last voyage, she left Liverpool on 22 April 1922 and ran onto rocks on the stormy night of 31 May at Great Barrier, when close to her Auckland destination. The stormy waves broke her in half on 1 June and the stern section soon sank into deeper water. A distress call was radioed, but the storm forced other ships to keep their distance. A Union collier, Katoa, landed its chief officer, purser, third engineer and two seamen at Tryphena, and they made their way over rough tracks to the Bay. Several attempts were made to float a line ashore from the Wiltshire. One of Katoa's crew grabbed it from between the waves, a brave act, for which he was later presented with a tankard. The line was then used to set up a breeches buoy and haul all 103 crew members to safety, with the help of sailors from HMS Philomel. A large crowd welcomed the crew when they arrived at Auckland. Salvage work, using divers, continued for over a year and included seven of the eight propeller blades, each weighing two tons. In 1955, part of the wreck was 33 metres (108 ft) below the surface.

The inquiry into the wreck found that the captain made a grave error of judgement in not slowing enough, when poor visibility obscured Cuvier lighthouse and when a lead line measurement showed the ship was in shallower water than expected. He was charged the costs of the inquiry, but his certificate was returned to him.
