= Harvey Stanley Hyde Blackburn =

Australian soldier (1876–1967)

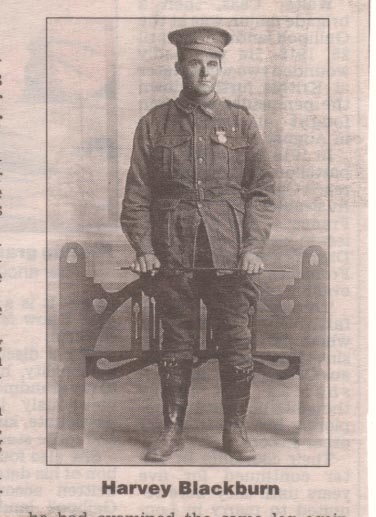
- A booking in the war
- Born: November 30, 1876; New South Wales, Australia
- Died: October 1967 (aged 90); Sydney, Australia
- Military career
- Allegiance: Australia
- Rank: Company Sergeant Major Warrant Officer Class 2
- Nickname: The Shadow
- Units: Second Tasmanian Imperial Bushmen Boer War and Railway World War I
- Other work: Tasmanian Railway Locomotive Driver

Harvey Stanley Hyde Blackburn(30 November 1876 – October 1967) was a member of the Australian Imperial Force (AIF), who during World War I managed to fool medical staff at the time of his voluntary enlistment so that they did not observe his artificial left foot, which he had lost only a short time earlier.

== Background ==
Born in Central New South Wales on 30 November 1876, Blackburn moved to and lived in New Zealand before moving back to Sydney. He embarked for war from Melbourne on the troop transport ship HMAT Shropshire on 11 May 1917, as Company Sergeant Major Warrant Officer Class 2 with the Railway Unit, and Reinforcements and Special Draft (February 1917 – October 1918).

== The ruse ==
Before he died at the age of 90 in 1967, Blackburn told how he fooled the doctor with a "one in a million" ruse. Claiming he was "shy" he asked the doctor to turn around while he took his pants off during his army entry medical examination. "I slipped my trousers across my artificial limb, and showed the doctor my good right leg" he said. Baring only his good leg, Blackburn proceeded to distract the doctor with questions for several minutes before reminding him to check the other leg, then presented the same leg again keeping the artificial leg covered and slightly under the table behind him. "Lucky for me he did not realise that he had examined the same leg again, he told me I was in perfect shape."

The ruse was almost successful until another doctor walked in and saw what he was doing. An argument resulted, with the second doctor stating that Blackburn was useless. Blackburn responded that if the doctor had been more observant he would have noticed that the leg was clearly evident on his attestation papers. He also pointed out the railway officer's testimony and argued that he was perfect for the front line because he could not retreat as quickly as the others and would be forced to stay with his locomotive and hold his ground. The doctors made Blackburn remove his trousers and walk around the room. The first doctor said he would pass fit a thousand men like Blackburn and he enlisted on 10 January 1917 with an A1 rating.

== Service ==
In service in France and Belgium, Blackburn hid his disability from his superiors; only his tent mates knew of his secret. He proudly stated that he never missed a parade or route march and his drill instructors never realised the extent of his disability, assuming he was suffering from a corn.

As a steam locomotive engine driver taking supplies to the front, the tall dark man dubbed "the shadow" by his mates managed to keep marching to a minimum. He was a Sergeant-Major with the 4th Broad Gauge Rail Operation Company, assigning himself special duties during six later medical parades.

Blackburn drove locomotive engines around Peronne and in Flanders without misfortune. However, Blackburn did experience some problems with his leg during the cold winter months, experiencing severe numbing. The cold conditions caused his calf to shrink from 16 to 9 inches.

== Post war ==
After the 1918 Armistice, Blackburn knew how to get onto one of the first ships while the rest waited. He told his officers his leg hurt him and asked for leave to visit London to have a fitting for a new artificial leg.

After returning to Australia, Blackburn received a new leg with a better fit and donated the original to the Australian War Memorial in 1925. He maintained that his was the only artificial leg accepted for service in the AIF, and possibly the entire Allied Forces. Having returned to Australia Blackburn resumed his work with the Tasmanian Railway Department.

== World War II ==
He loved army life so much that he tried to enlist again in 1942 for World War II, aged 66. However, he was passed unfit for service on age and medical grounds.

== Death ==
Harvey Stanley Hyde Blackburn died in Sydney in October 1967, a few months after his 90th birthday, and a year after the birth of his first grandchild, Harvey Gregory Scott Blackburn, retaining his name. He is buried in Botany Bay cemetery. Harvey donated his wooden leg to the Australian War Memorial, Canberra, where it can sometimes be seen on display.

== Present ==
Harvey's leg was previously on-loan to the Launceston museum and now is part of the Great War Exhibition open to the public after a $32 million redevelopment at the Australian War Memorial. Governor General Sir Peter Cosgrove launched the exhibition during a 22 February 2015 ceremony with a keynote address by veteran journalist Les Carlyon and performances from country music singer Lee Kernaghan, the Sydney Children's Choir, and the Royal Military College band.

The permanent exhibition, titled 'Australia in the Great War,' presents the story of Australia's role in the conflict chronologically, covering all major theatres of operations: Gallipoli; the Western Front; Sinai and Palestine; and the war at sea.
