= SS Argyllshire =

British passenger and refrigerated cargo steamship

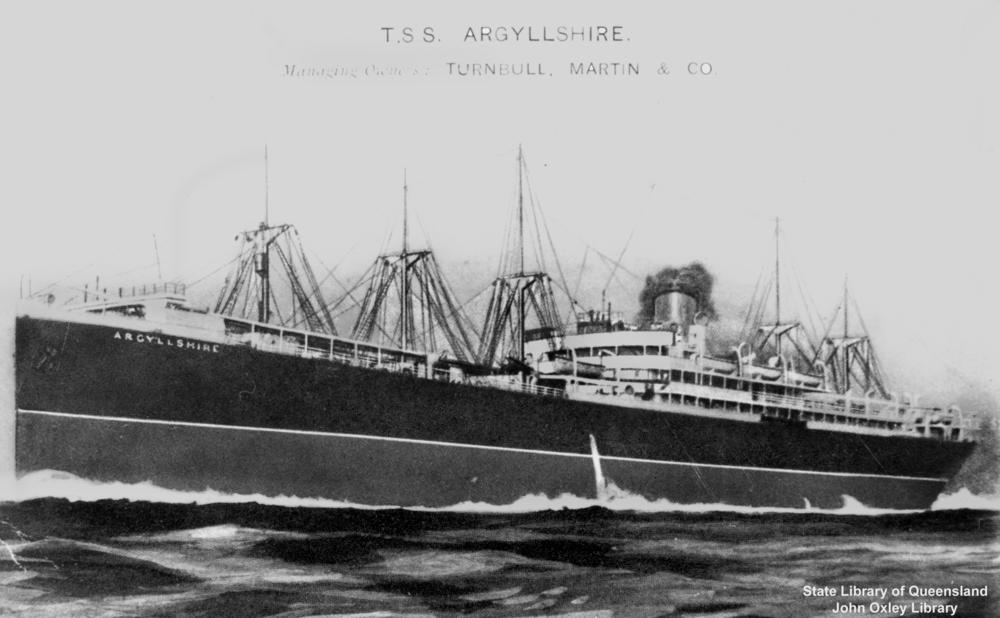
- A postcard of Argyllshire

History

United Kingdom
- Name: 1911 Argyllshire; 1932: Clan Urquhart
- Namesake: 1911 Argyll; 1932: Clan Urquhart
- Owner: 1911 Scottish Shire Line; 1930: Federal Steam Nav Company; 1932: Clan Line
- Operator: 1911 Turnbull, Martin & Co; 1914: Australian Government; 1930: Federal Steam Nav Co; 1932: Turnbull, Martin & Co; 1933: Clan Line
- Port of registry: Glasgow
- Route: 1911: England – Cape Town – Australia outward; Australia – Suez – England return; 1925: England – Australia – New Zealand – Panama – England; 1930: England – Panama – New Zealand; 1933: Britain – Australia
- Ordered: 1910
- Builder: John Brown & Company, Clydebank
- Yard number: 399
- Launched: 27 February 1911
- Completed: June 1911
- Maiden voyage: 5 August 1911
- Out of service: October 1930 – February 1932
- Refit: 1914; 1933
- Identification: UK official number 129581; 1911: code letters HTBG; by 1914: call sign GTJ; 1914: Transport A8; by 1930: call sign GNZK
- Fate: Scrapped, 1937

General characteristics
- Type: refrigerated cargo and passenger ship
- Tonnage: 10,932 GRT, 6,610 NRT, 12,492 DWT
- Displacement: 19,350
- Length: 547 ft (167 m) overall; 526.2 ft (160.4 m) registered
- Beam: 61.4 ft (18.7 m)
- Draught: 29 ft 9 in (9.07 m)
- Depth: 33.3 ft (10.1 m)
- Decks: 2
- Installed power: 2 × quadruple-expansion engines; 1,264 NHP; 6,500 ihp
- Propulsion: 2 × screws
- Speed: 13 to 14 knots (24 to 26 km/h)
- Capacity: passengers, as built: 130 1st class; 600 steerage; passengers, early 1920s: 113 1st class; 76 3rd class; passengers, later 1920s: 66 first class; cargo: 520,000 cu ft (14,725 m^{3}), including 379,200 cu ft (10,738 m^{3}) refrigerated
- Crew: 120
- Sensors & processing systems: by 1930: wireless direction finding
- Notes: sister ships: Shropshire; Wiltshire

SS Argyllshire was a refrigerated cargo and passenger steamship that was built in 1911 for Scottish Shire Line. The Federal Steam Navigation Company (FSNC) bought her in 1930. At the end of 1932, Clan Line bought her and renamed her Clan Urquhart.

She was one of three sister ships that were built in Scotland to take emigrants from the UK to Australia, and to bring frozen meat from Australia to the UK. When built, the three ships were the largest frozen meat carriers on that route. During World War I she was a troopship for the Australian government. She survived two U-boat attacks: in 1915 and 1917. In the first attack, both torpedoes missed. In the second, one torpedo hit her stern, but she stayed afloat.

Argyllshire was intended to make three round trips a year between Britain and Australasia. However, in the early 1920s she made only two round trips a year. In August 1925, UK shipowners reduced seamen's wages by £1 a week. Many seamen responded with a wildcat strike. In Argyllshire's case, this kept her in port in Fremantle for nearly eight weeks. When she returned to England, Scottish Shire Line replaced her UK crew with lascars. After the strike, Argyllshire made only one round trip a year; taking general cargo to Australia; and then bringing meat and fruit from New Zealand to Britain. She continued to carry passengers; but fewer emigrants. She carried small numbers of tourists.

FSNC bought her early in 1930; but later that year laid her up for 16 months. Early in 1932, Scottish Shire Line chartered her for a voyage to bring fruit from Tasmania to England. Early in the voyage from Tasmania, her refrigerating equipment suffered a temporary breakdown. Much of the fruit was over-ripe when she reached England, but liability was disputed between growers; buyers; and FSNC.

At the end of 1932, FSNC sold Argyllshire to Clan Line, who had her refitted, and renamed her Clan Urquhart. Clan Line did not carry passengers on her. It reallocated half of her first class accommodation as officers' quarters, and had the other half stripped out to create space for the export of cars. In 1933, the ship struck Smith Rock off the coast of Queensland, which caused water to rise in three of her cargo holds. She stayed afloat, and was repaired at Pinkenba and in Sydney. Clan Line continued to sail her between Britain and Australia until 1936, when she was sold for scrap. She was broken up in Wales in 1936–37.

== Namesakes ==
The ship was the first of two in the Scottish Shire Line fleet to be named after the county of Argyll. The second was a turbine steamship that was built in 1956 for Clan Line, and transferred to Scottish Shire Line in 1960. She was sold and renamed Schivago in 1975, and scrapped in 1977.

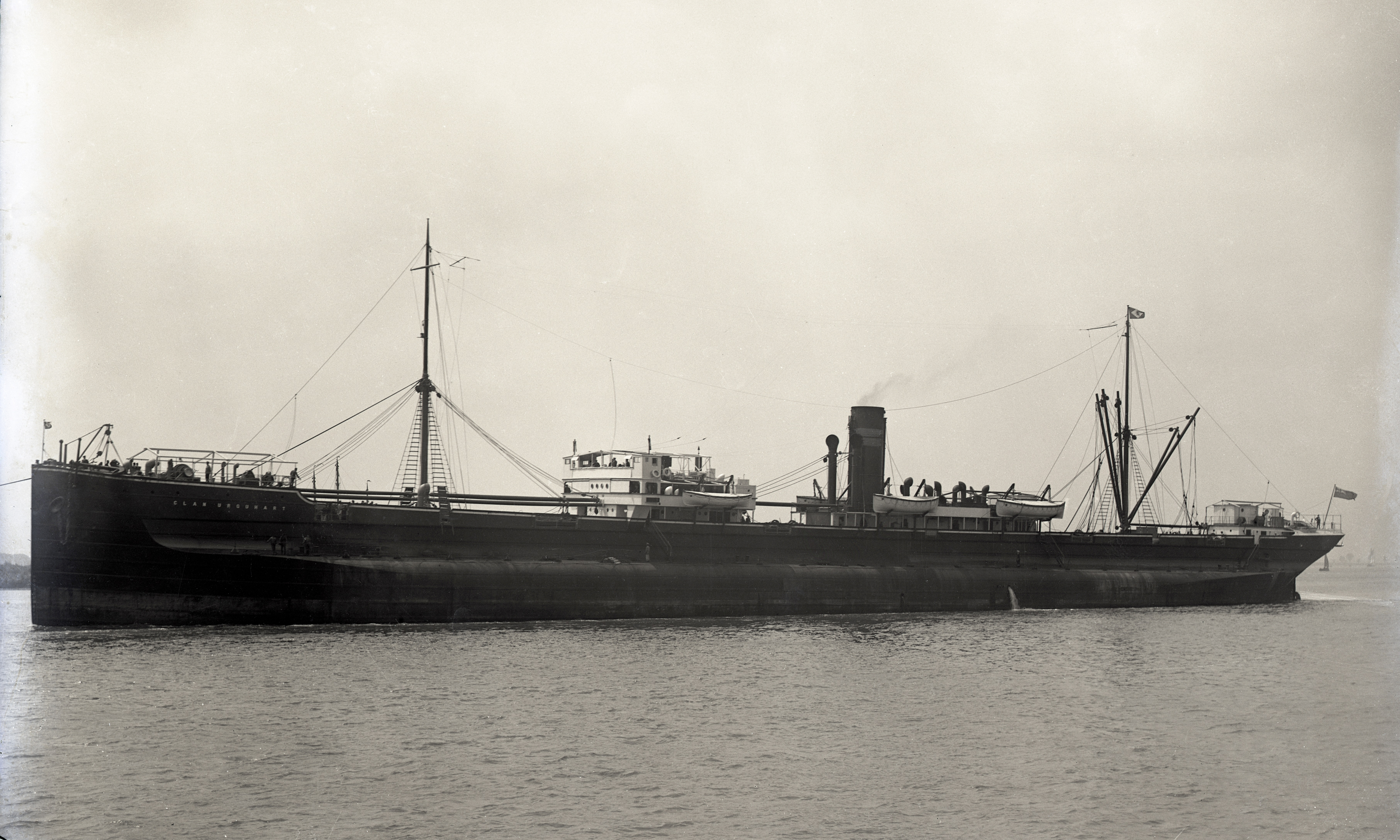
The first Clan Urquhart; an 1890s turret deck ship

She was the second of three ships in the Clan Line fleet to be named after Clan Urquhart. The first was a turret deck ship that was built in 1899. She was sold and renamed Generaldirektor Sonnenschein in 1929, and scrapped in Germany in 1933. The third was a steamship that was built in 1944, and scrapped in Taiwan in 1966.

== Federal–Houlder–Shire Line ==
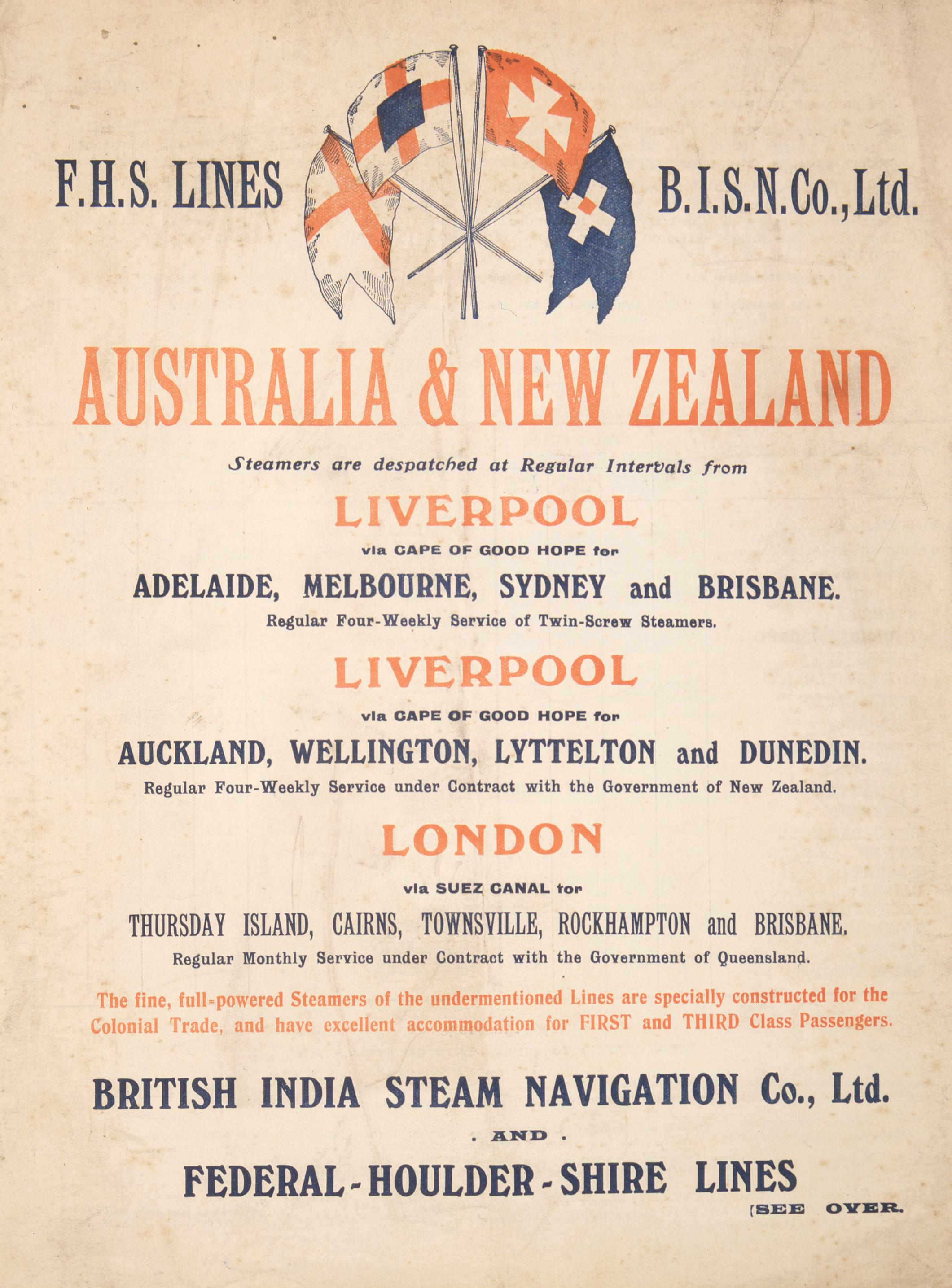
Joint poster for F–H–S and BISN

In 1904, two British shipping companies established a joint venture to import frozen meat from Australia and New Zealand, via Cape Colony, to the UK. They were the Federal Steam Navigation Company (FSNC) and Houlder Line.

In 1906, Scottish Shire Line joined the partnership, and it became Federal–Houlder–Shire Line (F–H–S). Competition was fierce, and F–H–S fought a rate war against Shaw, Savill & Albion Line; the New Zealand Shipping Company; and the Union Steam Ship Company of New Zealand. This was settled in 1906 by F–H–S agreeing to confine itself to the British ports of Glasgow; Liverpool; Manchester; and Avonmouth, while its opponents confined themselves to London and Southampton. Also in 1906, F–H–S began to work with the British India Steam Navigation Company (BISN) on services to Queensland.

In 1909, the size of the F–H–S fleet peaked at 24 ships; of which 11 belonged to FSNC; seven to Scottish Shire; and four to Houlder. In 1910, Clan Line acquired control of Scottish Shire Line. However, also in 1910, FSNC moved into closer partnership with one of its former opponents; the New Zealand Shipping Co. F–H–S consequently agreed to stop serving New Zealand, and concentrate on Australia. Houlder was short of money, and lacked the capital to buy new ships. In July 1911, Furness, Withy bought a controlling interest in Houlder. That December, Furness, Withy withdrew the company from F–H–S, and in April 1912 it transferred Houlder's four F–H–S ships to FSNC. F–H–S became Federal and Shire Line.

== Federal and Shire Line ==
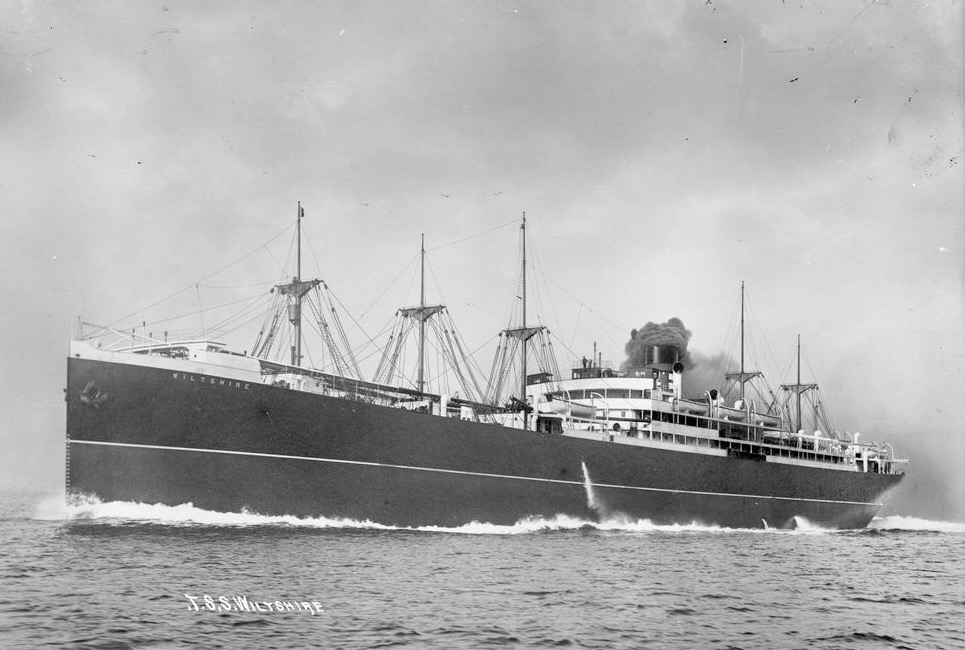
A postcard of Wiltshire, almost identical to that of Argyllshire

F–H–S had continued to face fierce competition on the route between the UK and Australia. Also, South America produced meat more cheaply than did Australia, and the shipping distance from to Europe is shorter from South America than it is from Australia. In 1910, F–H–S had planned a smaller fleet of larger ships, in order to be more economical. They were ordered from John Brown & Company of Clydebank in Glasgow. John Brown built three 11,000 GRT sister ships; each with twin screws; driven by economical quadruple-expansion engines. When new, they were the largest frozen meat carriers between Australia and the UK. Each ship also had berths for about 700 passengers, to carry emigrants from the UK. They were designed to make the journey in 36 days in each direction. By the time the three ships were completed; Houlder was withdrawing; ceding its part of the joint venture to FSNC. Hence, the trio entered service under Federal and Shire Line (F&S).

John Brown built the trio with consecutive yard numbers: 399; 400; and 401. The lead ship, yard number 399; was launched on 27 February 1911 as Argyllshire; and completed for Scottish Shire Line that June. Yard number 400 was launched on 27 April 1911 as Shropshire, and completed for FSNC that September. Yard number 401 was launched on 19 December 1911 as Wiltshire, and completed for FSNC in February 1912. The three sisters entered service under a contract with the Victoria State Government.

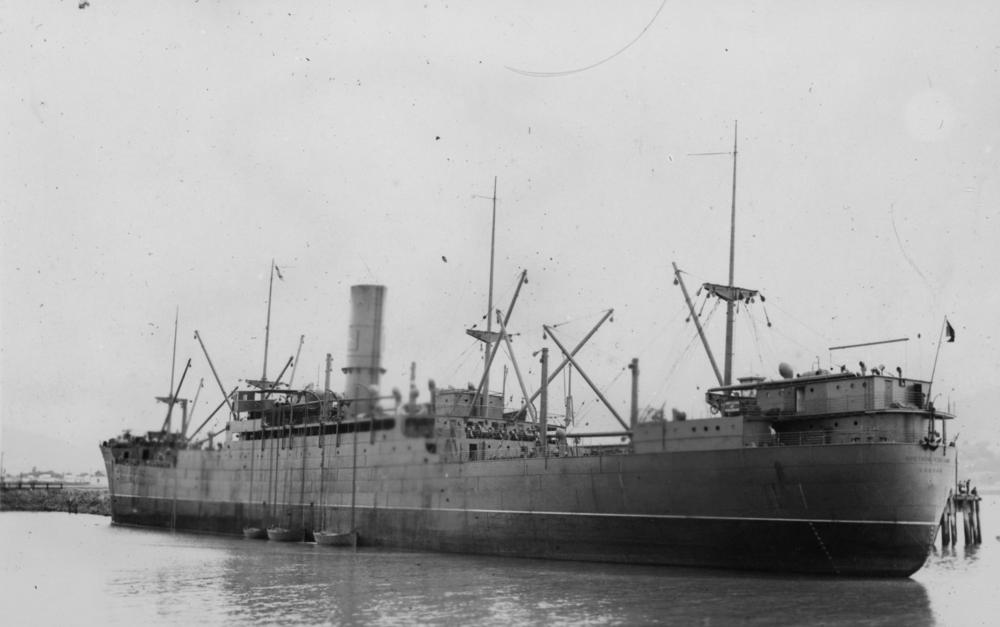
FSNC's Northumberland

In August 1913, it was announced that the companies in the F&S partnership had ordered another six new ships, including two from British shipyards of a design similar to the Argyllshire trio. The other four were smaller; about 10,000 GRT each. One was to be built in Britain, and the other three at a French shipyard. This news was later revised, to the effect that only one new ship of Argyllshire's size was to be built. This was FSNC's Northumberland, which was built by Swan, Hunter & Wigham Richardson at Wallsend to a revised design; with reduction-geared steam turbines instead of reciprocating engines; a cruiser stern; and a different arrangement of masts, derricks, and superstructure. The 10,000-tonners included FSNC's Devon, built by Ateliers et Chantiers de France in Dunkirk; and Cumberland, built by William Hamilton and Company in Port Glasgow. None had been completed by August 1914, when the First World War began.

When the war began, the F&S joint service was suspended. The UK concentrated on buying meat more cheaply from South America, and the Australian Government chartered all both Argyllshire and her sisters as troopships. All three survived the war, but the F&S service never resumed.

== Argyllshire ==
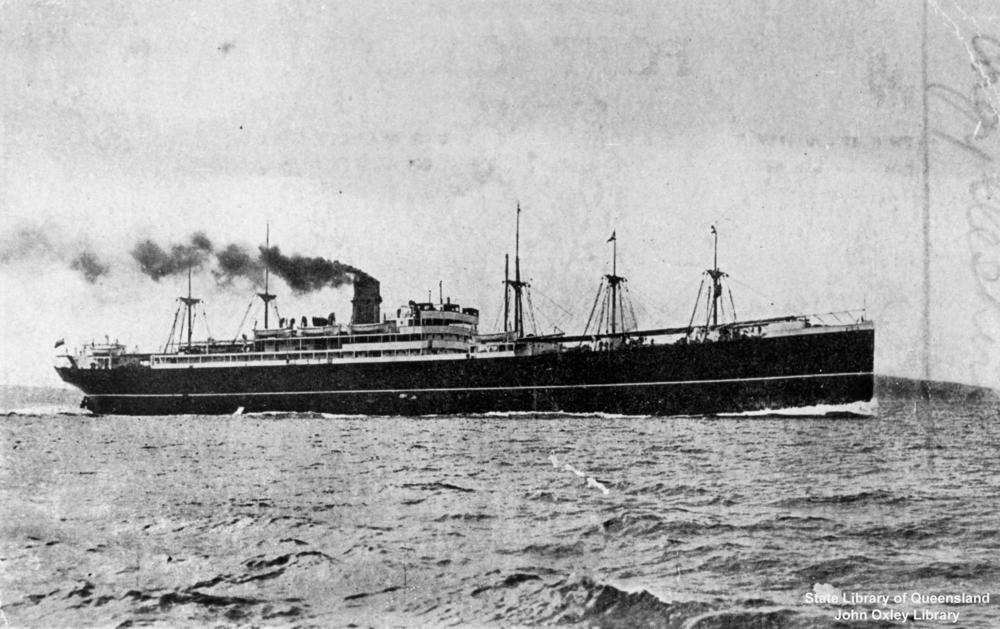
Argyllshire under way

Argyllshire's lengths were 547 ft (167 m) overall and 526.2 ft (160.4 m) registered. Her beam was 61.4 ft (18.7 m); her depth was 33.3 ft (10.1 m); and her draught was 29 ft 9 in (9.07 m). She had berths for 730 passengers: 130 in first class; and 600 in steerage dormitories in her 'tween decks. Passenger facilities included a lounge; smoking room; barber's shop; and dispensary. She carried a crew of 120. Her lifeboats had capacity for only 450 people. Her first class accommodation was later reduced from 130 berths to 62.

Her holds had capacity for 520,000 cu ft (14,725 m^{3}) of cargo. 379,200 cu ft (10,738 m^{3}) of that space was refrigerated for chilled or frozen perishables. It used Haslam's system; in which compressed ammonia is a coolant. She had about 8 miles (13 km) of pipes for ammonia, and about 10 miles (16 km) of pipes for brine to cool her 'tween decks. She had six cargo hatches, and her hull was divided by eight watertight bulkheads. She had five masts, each equipped with four derricks. One derrick had a lifting capacity of 30 tons, and the others had all been tested to 10 tons. All of her masts were telescopic; and her funnel was relatively short; in order for her to pass under bridges over the Manchester Ship Canal. Her tonnages were 10,932 GRT; 6,610 NRT; 12,492 DWT; and 19,350 tons displacement.

Argyllshire had four boilers; two double-ended and two single-ended; heated by a total of 24 forced-draught furnaces. They supplied steam to her engines at 215 pounds per square inch (1,480 kPa). The combined power of her twin engines was rated at 1,264 NHP or 6,500 ihp, and gave her a speed of 13 or 14 knots (24 or 26 km/h).

Turnbull, Martin & Co managed Argyllshire for Scottish Shire Line. She was registered in Glasgow. Her UK official number was 129581, and her code letters were HTBG. She was equipped with wireless telegraphy. By 1914, her call sign was GTJ. By 1930, her call sign was GNZK.

== Maiden voyage ==
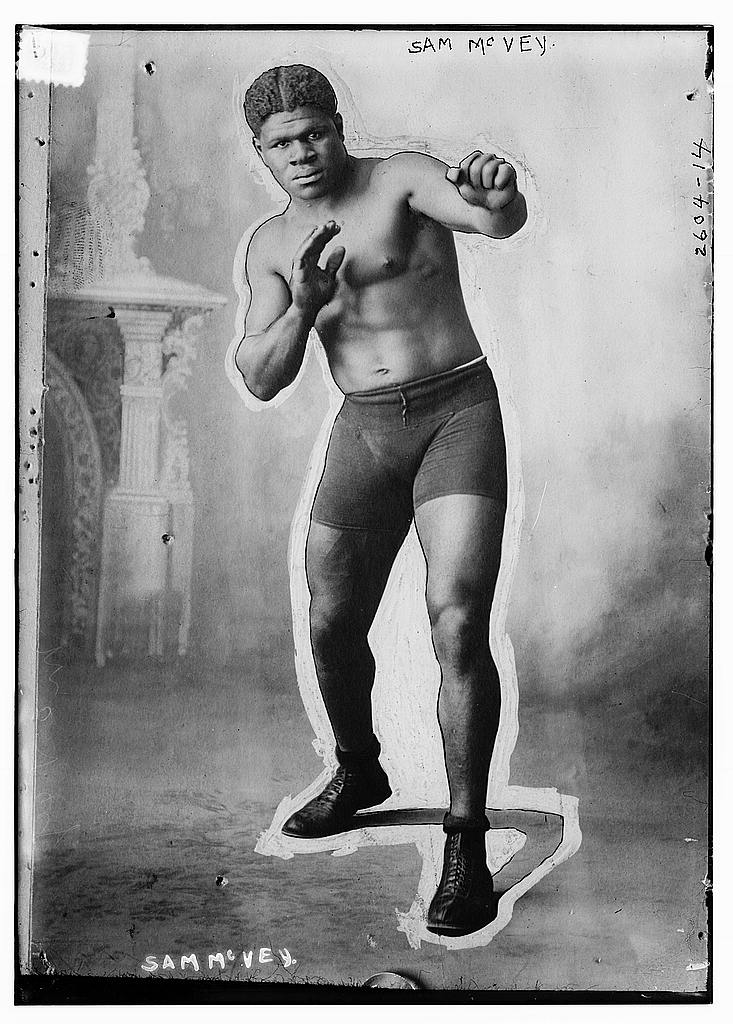
Sam McVey

On 5 August 1911, Argyllshire left Liverpool on her maiden voyage. Her Master was a Captain Chicken. Her passengers included the US heavyweight boxer Sam McVey, who sailed with his wife; his manager; and his sparring partner "Bandsman" Rice. McVey had served on US sailing ships; and on Argyllshire he was her helmsman on the afternoon watch from 12:00 hrs to 16:00 hrs each day. Her Second Officer described McVey as "a first-class seaman". Argyllshire called at Cape Town; where she left on 24 August. Two stowaways were discovered on the voyage.

On 11 September, McVey steered Argyllshire past Kangaroo Island; through the hazardous Port Philip Heads; and into the Outer Harbour outside Adelaide. The next day; McVey's manager, William McLaine; pleaded guilty to assaulting a barman aboard the ship at sea on 3 September. Allegedly, McLaine had been in the galley with some stokers, and was mishandling the stowaways by hanging them by the arms from the stanchions. The barman remonstrated with McLaine, who responded by punching the barman in the mouth. McLaine was fined £2, plus £4 11s costs.

On 14 September, Argyllshire reached Melbourne, where she was to discharge 4,500 tons of cargo at Victoria Dock. On 21 September she reached Sydney; and on 29 September she reached Musgrave Wharf in Brisbane, where she was to discharge 1,600 tons of cargo. At the time, she was the largest ship to have navigated the Brisbane River above Bulimba.

On 5 October, the manager of Turnbull, Martin & Co, RB Dunlop, along with his wife, hosted an "at home" aboard Argyllshire in Brisbane to show her to invited guests. The next day, the ship left Brisbane on her return voyage to Liverpool. She called at Sydney, and then on 19 October arrived in Geelong to load 45,000 carcasses of meat. On 21 October, the Geelong Orchestral Association performed a charity concert aboard her, to raise funds for the Geelong Sailors' Rest. On 26 October the ship left Geelong, and two days later she reached Adelaide. There she loaded cargo including mutton, lamb, sheepskins, wool, preserved rabbits, frozen hares, wheat, wine, and copper ingots. On 30 October the ship hosted a lunch for guests; including the South Australian Minister of Agriculture; invited by Elder, Smith, & Co. On 3 November she left Adelaide for England. She returned via the Suez Canal, and reached London on 9 December.

== Subsequent voyages ==
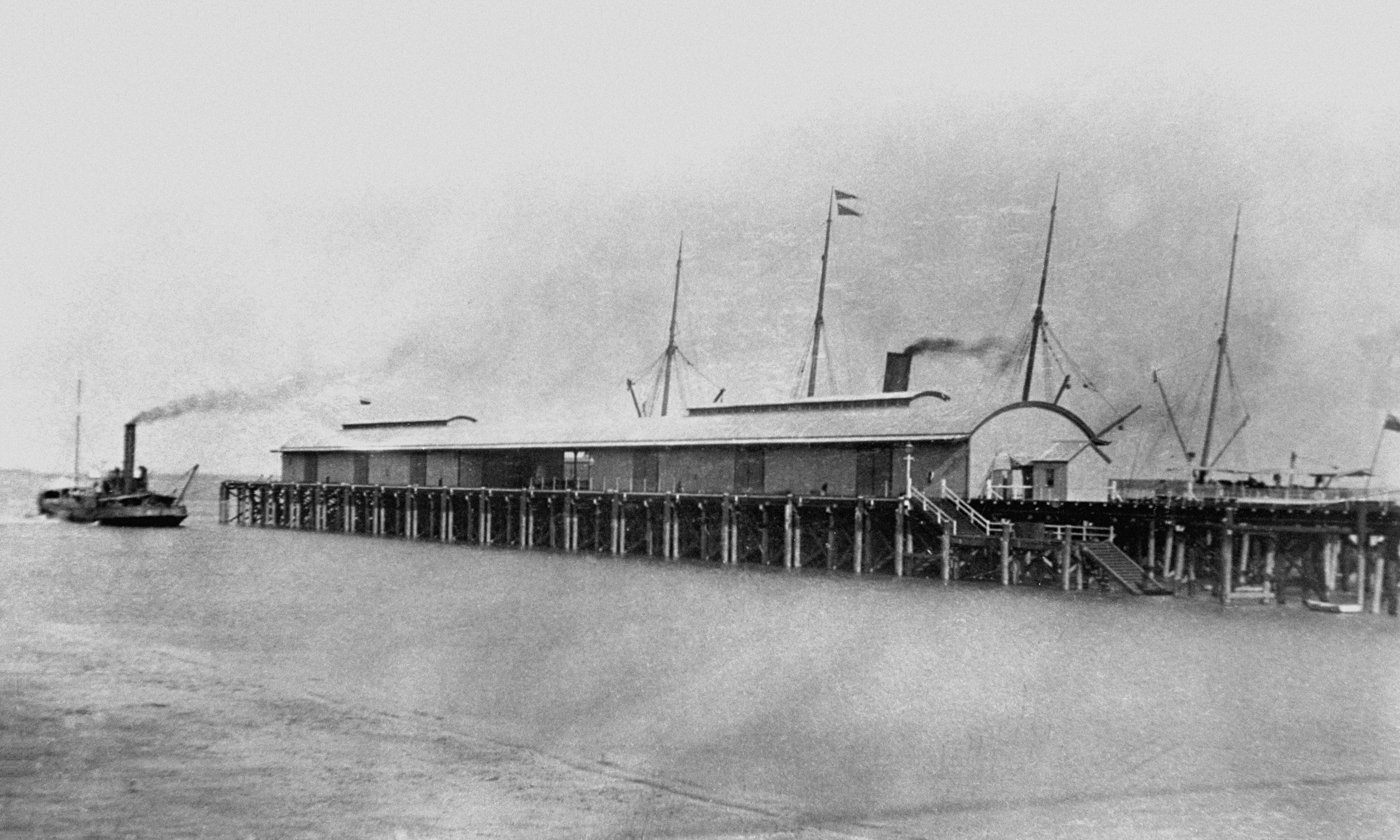
The wharf at Broadmount, Queensland

On her second voyage to Australia, Argyllshire's ports of call included Hobart, where she arrived on 6 April 1912. There she was to load 125,000 cases of fruit, which at that time was the largest consignment of fruit ever sent by refrigerated transport. She again returned via Suez, and on 25 May reached London. On her third voyage, her ports of call included the Fitzroy River in Queensland, where she arrived on 15 September. There she loaded meat at the now-defunct port of Broadmount, and wool at Port Alma. On this voyage she returned via Durban and Las Palmas, and reached London on 19 November.

By December 1912, Burns, Philp & Co was advertising a five-month package tour in 1913 from Australia to Europe via Argyllshire. In February and March 1913, she embarked 40 holidaymakers at Sydney, Melbourne, and Adelaide; to visit Britain, Ireland, France, and Switzerland. Her cargo to Britain on this voyage included Australian pears. She called at Colombo in Ceylon; passed through the Suez Canal; and reached London on 25 April. The success of the package tour to Europe in 1913 led Burns, Philp to announce two such tours to depart from Australia in March 1914: the first aboard the P&O liner RMS Moldavia; and the second aboard Shropshire; one of Argyllshire's sister ships.

Toward the end of July 1913, Argyllshire again loaded meat at Broadmount. There was other cargo for her from Rockhampton; including wool, hides, and tallow; but it was feared that if she loaded too much cargo at Broadmount, her draught might be too deep for her to return down the Fitzroy River without grounding. Accordingly, lighters took the wool, hides, and tallow downriver to Port Alma; where their cargo was transhipped to Argyllshire after she left Broadmount. She left Brisbane on 12 August with cargo including eight crates of Queensland cheese to be shown at a dairy exhibition in the Royal Agricultural Hall in London. She left Sydney on 19 August having loaded meat; hides; butter; tallow; ore; and gold. She called at Melbourne and Port Adelaide, where she left on 26 August. She reached London on 30 September.

Argyllshire's final peacetime voyage left Liverpool on 24 May 1914. She called at Cape Town, Adelaide, Melbourne, and Sydney, and reached Brisbane on 19 July. Nine stowaways from Sydney had been found aboard, and on 20 July all of them pleaded guilty at South Brisbane Police Court. On 22 July, the ship left Brisbane to load cargo for her return voyage to England. She loaded at Townsville; Port Alma; and Gladstone; returned to Brisbane on 12 August; and reached Sydney on 18 August.

== Troop ship ==
By 20 August, the Australian Government had chartered Argyllshire to be a troopship. The government also chartered both of her sister ships; Shropshire and Wiltshire. On 22 August, Cockatoo Island Dockyard in Sydney started fitting out Argyllshire to carry 845 troops and 392 horses. On 9 September she was completed as transport A8. On 18 October she left Sydney carrying elements of the 1st Field Artillery Brigade: the Headquarters; 1st and 2nd Battery; most of the 3rd Battery; most of the Ammunition Column; plus one medical officer; two chaplains; and two civilian nurses. They numbered 30 officers; two sergeants; and 798 other ranks; plus 373 horses. She steamed to King George Sound, where a convoy was assembling to take the Australian Imperial Force (AIF) overseas.

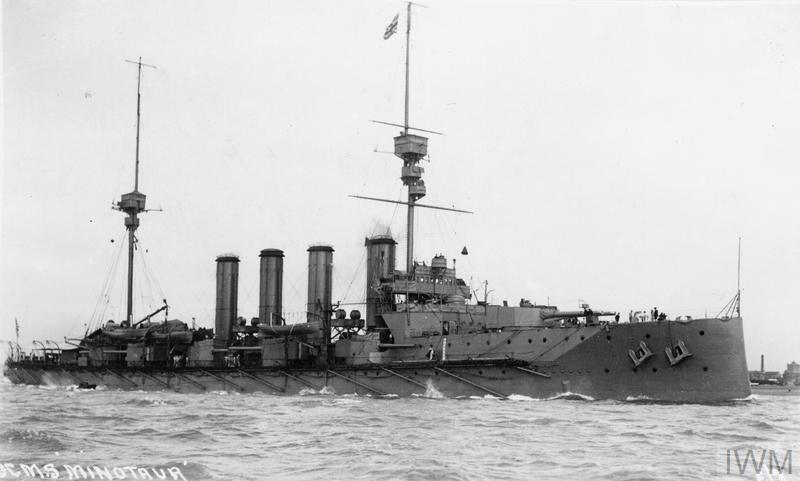
HMS Minotaur

36 transports carrying Australian troops; horses; and materiel assembled in King George's Sound. Another ten joined them carrying the first part of the New Zealand Expeditionary Force. The convoy sailed on 1 November, and at sea was joined by another two troopships from Fremantle. The armoured cruiser HMS Minotaur and light cruisers HMAS Sydney and HMAS Melbourne escorted the convoy, and two days later were reinforced by the Japanese armoured cruiser Ibuki. The convoy crossed the Indian Ocean; went through the Suez Canal; and on 3 December reached Alexandria in Egypt.

Argyllshire proposed dazzle camouflage

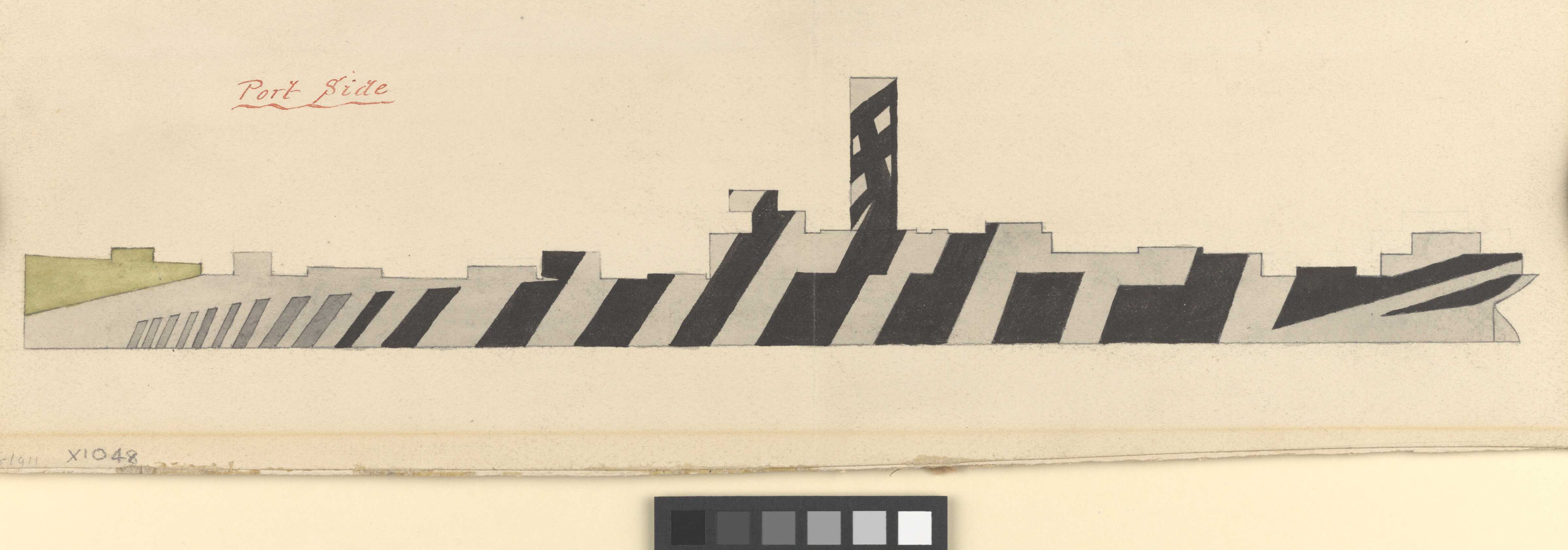
Port side

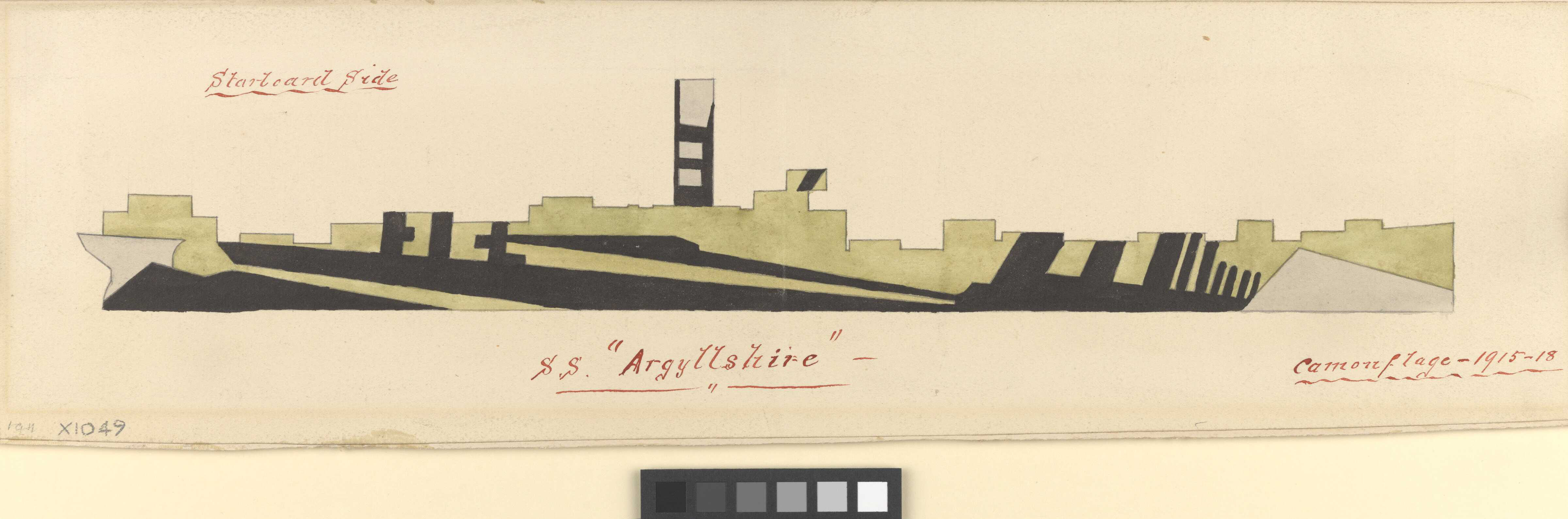
Starboard side

Argyllshire made another six voyages taking AIF troops overseas from Australia, including one to the Dardanelles. The final voyage started from Fremantle on 9 November 1916. On one voyage, from Melbourne to Britain via the Panama Canal, she carried a flour, frozen meat, and general cargo. Fire broke out in her number three hold, and her crew's fire-fighting efforts failed to extinguish it. It burned for three days, until she reached Newport News, where the port's fire service flooded the hold.

During the war, Argyllshire was painted in dazzle camouflage. U-boats twice attacked her in the English Channel. The first time was in 1915. She had left Sydney on 16 April, and on 25 May 1915 was off Cherbourg, when a U-boat fired two torpedoes at her. Both missed, and she reached safety in Le Havre.

The second attack was off Start Point, Devon, on 1 February 1917, when Argyllshire was in passage from London to Barry via Devonport. UC-46 hit her with one torpedo; damaging her stern; and carrying away her rudder, and damaging both of her screws. Her stern bulkhead held, but her engine room was soon knee-deep in water. The ship's crew brought her close to shore (presumably using her twin engines to steer), to be ready to beach her if the incoming water overcame her electric pumps. Five tugboats were sent in response to her wireless distress signal, and towed her 27 nautical miles (50 km) to Plymouth Sound. She entered the sound drawing 40 feet (12 m) at her stern. Her engine room and power compartments were flooded, and her port propeller shaft had failed. The incoming water had overcome her pumps, and she was rapidly sinking. She reached an emergency dry dock just in time, where her stern sank until it rested on the wooden chocks.

In 1919 Argyllshire repatriated Australian troops. She left England on 2 August carrying troops, including wounded; plus cargo for Adelaide, Melbourne, and Sydney; and sailed via South Africa. On 18 September she reached Adelaide, where she landed 181 troops, including two stretcher cases. The troops received a formal welcome home; which included an address by the Governor-General; presumably Ronald Ferguson. On 22 September she reached the new pier at Port Melbourne, where she more than 1,200 troops. 490 were for Victoria; 98 for Tasmania; and 660 were for New South Wales. Two special trains took the New South Wales contingent to Sydney, where they arrived the next day. The ship stayed in Melbourne to discharge cargo, and reached Sydney on 29 September.

== Two return trips each year ==
On 9 October 1919 Argyllshire left Sydney for Liverpool. Instead of her usual routes, she sailed east, via New Zealand and the Panama Canal. She called at Auckland; Wellington; Dunedin; Port Chalmers; and again at Wellington. Passenger fares from Wellington to Liverpool were £66 one-say, and £105 return. She left Wellington on 18 November. She reached Panama on 12 December; left a port listed as "Louisberg" (possibly Louisbourg, on Cape Breton Island) on 27 December; and reached Liverpool on 5 January 1920.

In the 1920s, Argyllshire's passenger accommodation was revised again, to 113 first class and 76 third class. She continued to trade with Australia and New Zealand, but trade conditions became depressed, which made it harder to find enough cargo for her. In 1921, Argyllshire sailed from Sydney via Adelaide and Cape Town to Dunkirk, where she arrived on 5 April.

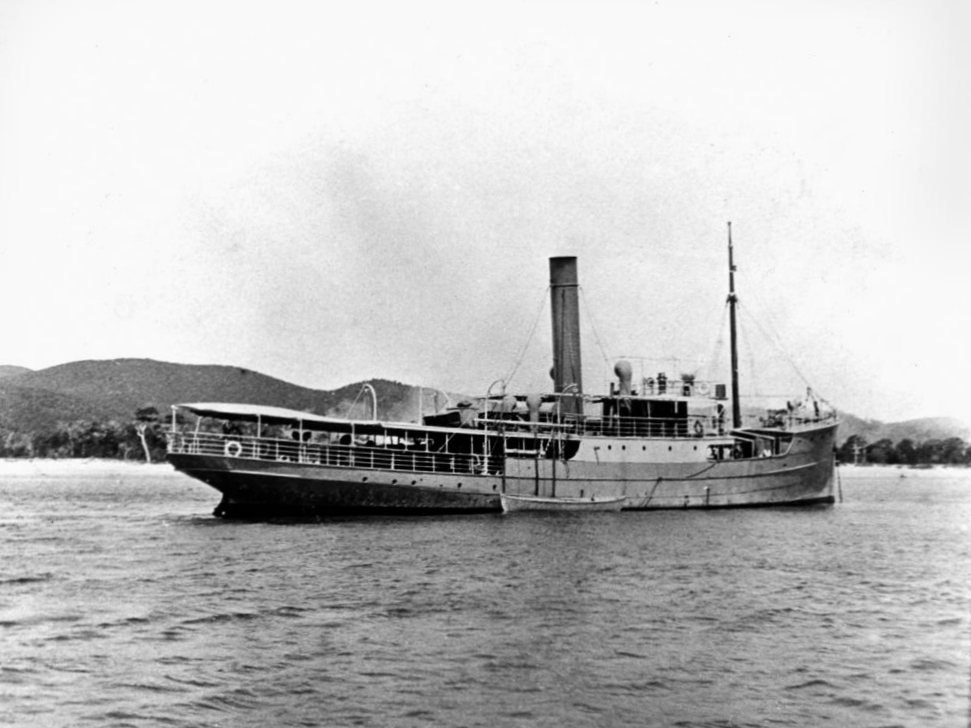
The pilot steamer Matthew Flinders

In the first week of February, 1922, Argyllshire was in Brisbane loading wool; butter; frozen meat; and hides, during an outbreak of bubonic plague. On 7 February, her Master, Captain V Page, pleaded guilty in Brisbane Summons Court to breaking a quarantine regulation to keep all of the ship's portholes closed. The next day, the ship collided with the pilot steamer Matthew Flinders. On this voyage, Argyllshire again loaded fruit in Hobart to take to the UK: 110,000 cases of apples; 16,000 cases of pears; and 8,000 cases of pulped fruit.

At the end of June, the Queensland Government claimed £2,500 for the damage to Matthew Flinders. However, by 17 August, when the Brisbane Supreme Court started to hear the case, the claim had been reduced to £1,000. The case concluded in early September. Witnesses from the two ships gave conflicting accounts of the collision. Mr Justice McNaughton found in favour of the government's claim, but determined the amount of damages as £426 5s, and awarded no costs.

By 5 June 1922, Scottish Shire Line had replaced Captain Page with Captain James Wallace as Argyllshire's Master. Wallace held a silver Lloyd's Medal for his conduct in 1899 when his first command, the 5,550 GRT Perthshire, broke her propeller shaft in the Tasman Sea. Perthshire drifted for 52 days, until her engineers reconnected the shaft, and got her under way again.

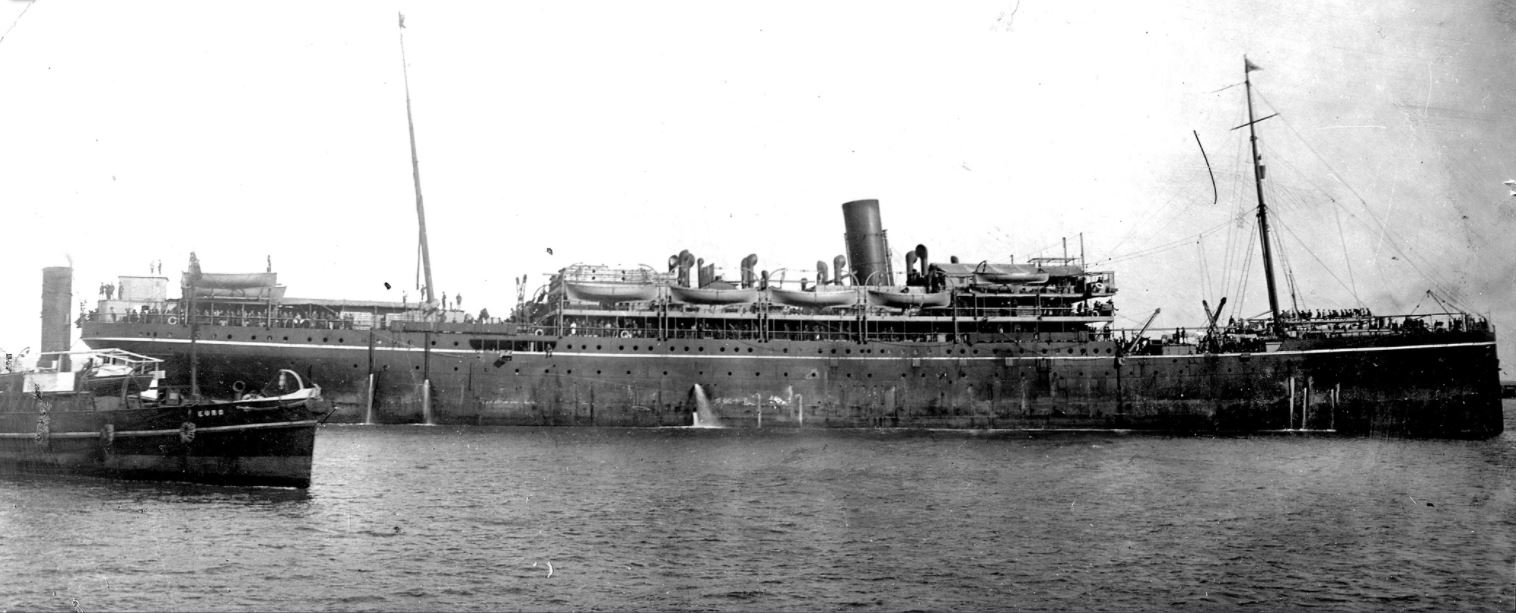
The P&O liner Beltana

On an outward voyage in July 1922, a cyclone hit Argyllshire in the Indian Ocean. She listed at up to 30 degrees, and great waves broke over her deck. Lifeboats; furniture; crockery; and medicine bottles in her medical dispensary were damaged. However, she reached Adelaide safely on 13 July. On the same voyage, the crew fielded a successful amateur football team in Australia. In Melbourne it defeated a team from the New Zealand Shipping Company cargo ship Otorama, and drew against a team from the P&O liner Beltana. In Brisbane, it defeated three local teams: Merthyr Thistle, Corinthians, and Bulimba Rangers; plus a team from the crew of Aberdeen Line's Euripides. It also beat a local team in Port Adelaide. The cargo that Argyllshire took from Australia to the UK on her return voyage included 540,000 eggs.

Argyllshire continued to take emigrants to Australia. On an outward voyage at the beginning of 1923, her passengers included 51 emigrants; 31 of whom were destined for Victoria. Many were armed forces veterans, and all were aided by the New Settlers' League. On the same voyage, she again loaded fruit in Hobart; on this occasion 108,712 cases. She also brought grapes from Western Australia to the UK.

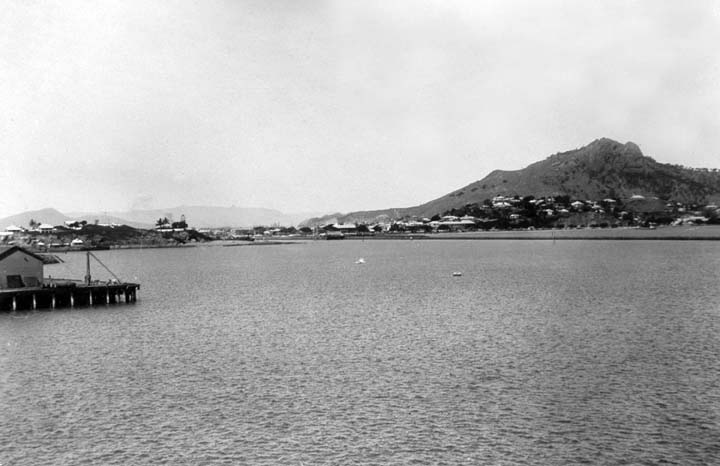
Townsville in the 1920s

On 23 June 1923, Argyllshire left Liverpool for Australia. Three days later, two stowaway boys, aged 16 and 17, were discovered in either her stokehold or one of her bunkers (accounts differ). Captain Wallace clothed them and put them to work: one as a stoker, and the other as an assistant butcher. After the ship rounded the Cape of Good Hope, huge seas swept over her for seven days. One wave dislodged winding gear weighing several tons; flattened the rail on part of her deck; and smashed a door to the stewards' quarters. When another wave hit the ship, one of the cooks in her galley lost his footing, and a pan of hot fat was spilt over him. He died of burns three or four days later, and Captain Wallace buried him at sea. On 2 August the ship reached Melbourne; where the two stowaways were handed to the immigration authorities; and sent to work as farm hands. Argyllshire then called at Geelong; Sydney; and Brisbane; and continued north to Townsville to load wool. On her return voyage to Europe, Argyllshire called at Sydney, where she loaded more wool. She called at Fremantle; Dunkirk; and Antwerp; and reached London on 1 December.

On 19 January 1924, Argyllshire left Liverpool for Australia. She reached Adelaide on 27 February; called at Jones' Bay in Sydney; and on 17 March reached Brisbane, where she loaded cargo including 9,524 boxes of butter. On her return voyage she called at Sydney; and then Hobart; where she loaded 54,000 cases of fruit, 3,000 cases of canned fruit; 3,000 bales of hops, and 300 tons of zinc. She called at Williamstown, Brisbane, where she berthed at Gellibrand Pier; and then Port Adelaide, where she loaded apples; pears; currants; canned fruit; dried fruit; wine; and sheepskins, that were destined for London; Avonmouth; and Glasgow. She left Adelaide on 16 April; sailed via the Suez Canal and Gibraltar; and on 27 May reached London.

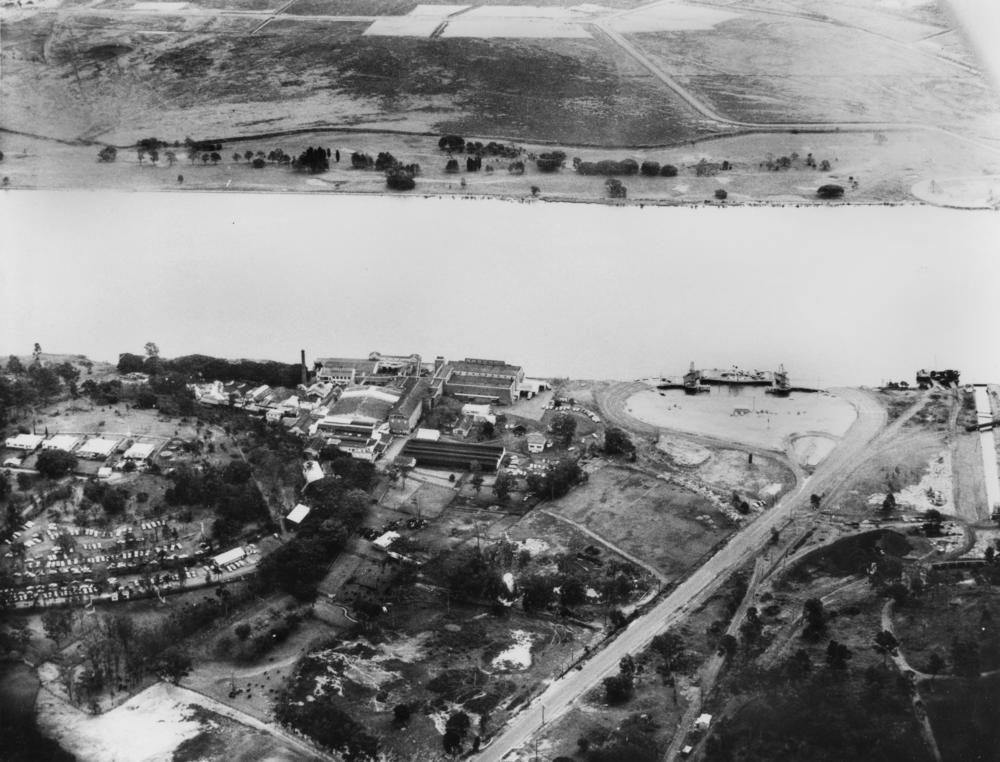
Aerial view of Thomas Borthwick & Co's meat processing factory and wharf in Queensport, Brisbane

On 2 August 1924, Argyllshire left Liverpool for Australia via Cape Town. As she crossed the southern Indian Ocean, she suffered a fire in her bunkers, but no damage was reported. She called at Adelaide; Melbourne; and Sydney; and on 29 September reached Brisbane, where she loaded 13,101 sacks of maize. She loaded 200 tons of frozen meat at Thomas Borthwick & Co's wharf, and on 11 October left Brisbane to start her voyage home. She called at Sydney; loaded frozen meat at Geelong; called at Williamstown in Melbourne; and then at Victoria Quay in Fremantle. She called at Port Sudan; passed through the Suez Canal; and Liverpool; and on 18 December arrived in Manchester via the Ship Canal.

On 8 February 1925, Argyllshire left Liverpool for Australia. She called at Cape Town, and on 22 March reached Adelaide. She called at Melbourne; and then Sydney; where she berthed at Pyrmont, Sydney. She called at Newcastle; and on 17 April reached Brisbane, where she was to discharge general cargo at Norman wharf. She called again at Sydney; then sailed to Napier, New Zealand, where she loaded frozen meat and general cargo. She called at Bluff; and loaded 2,412 cases of apples. at Port Chalmers. She called at Lyttelton; and on 21 May reached Wellington. Turnbull, Martin & Co advertised berths on Argyllshire from Wellington to London as "Excellent accommodation for Saloon Passengers only". She passed through the Panama Canal, and on 4 July reached London.

== Strike against reduced wages ==
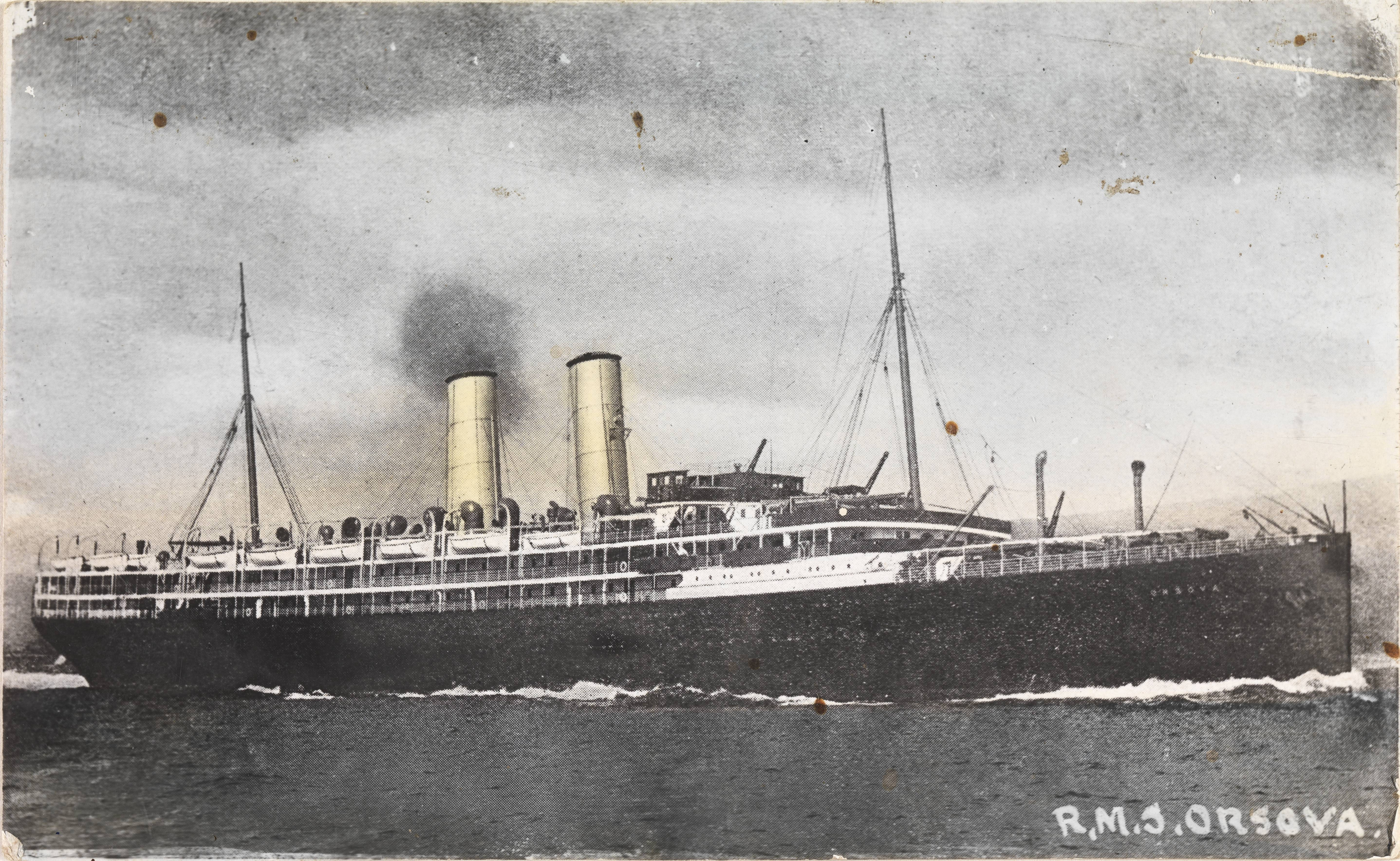
The Orient SN Co liner Orsova

On 8 August 1925, Argyllshire left Liverpool for Australia. Unusually for an outward passage, she sailed via the Suez Canal. From 1 August, UK shipowners had reduced crew wages by £1 a month. Some seamen responded with a wildcat strike. The National Sailors' and Firemen's Union (NSFU) opposed the strike; but after some weeks of wildcat action, the breakaway Amalgamated Marine Workers' Union (AMWU) supported it. The strike of UK seamen spread from Britain to Australia, where it affected ports of the eastern states first, and then spread to Western Australia. The Seamen's Union of Australia supported the strike, but did not join it.

On 25 August, the Orient Steam Navigation Company liner Orsova arrived in Fremantle, where her crew refused to put to sea. On 1 September, the P&O ship Borda reached Fremantle, where her crew also refused orders. On 9 September, Argyllshire reached Fremantle from Liverpool via Suez. Her crew went ashore to a meeting at Fremantle Trades Hall, where they decided to join the strike. That evening, the White Star Line ship Maimoa arrived in Fremantle, and also joined the strike.

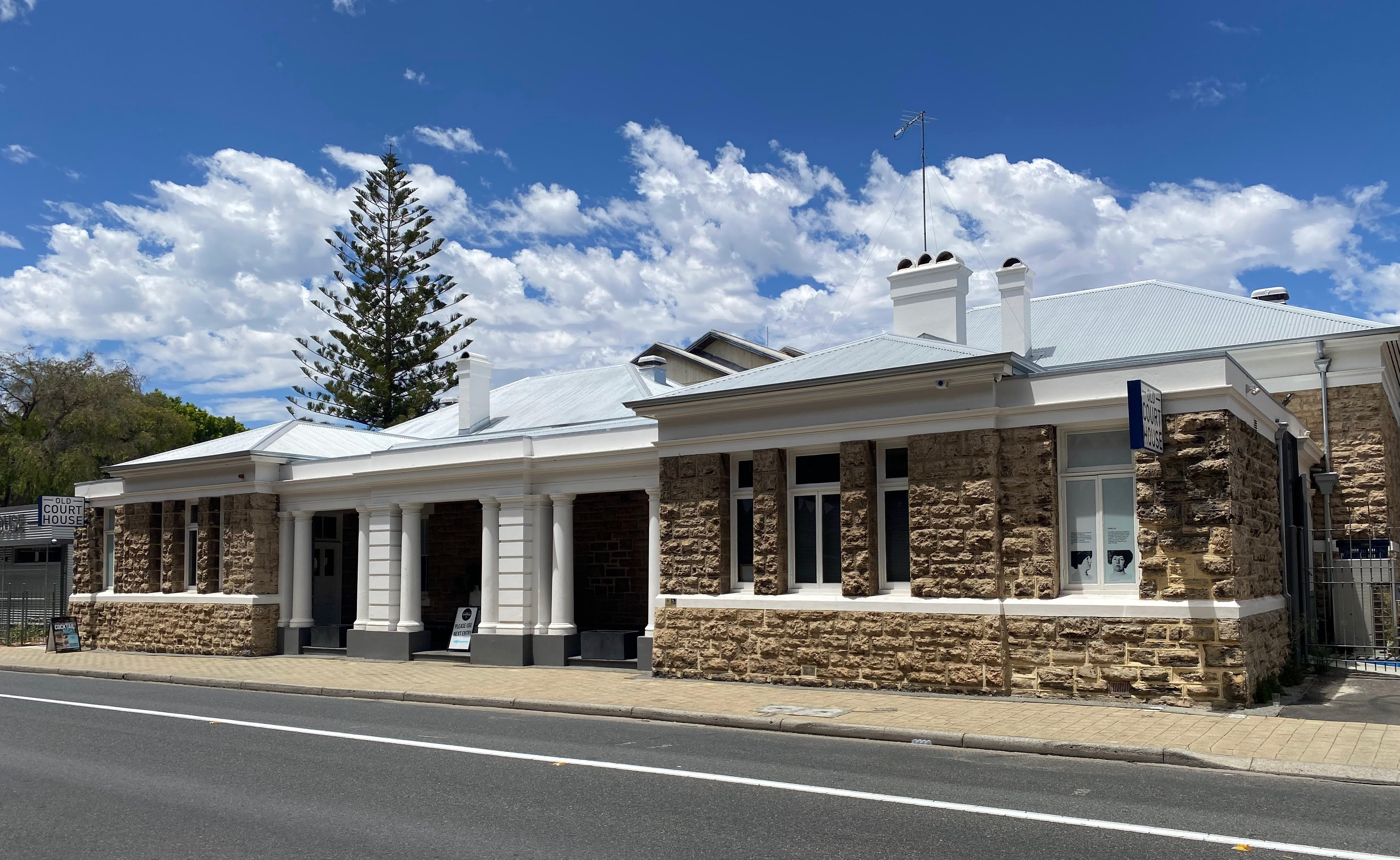
The former Police Court in Fremantle

On 12 September, 19 crewmen from Orsova and nine men from Borda were charged with having disobeyed lawful commands. Another report stated that 16 men from Orsova and eight from Borda were charged. On the morning of 17 September, the defendants strode to Fremantle Police Court at the head of a procession of 500 seamen, some of whom carried improvised banners expressing solidarity. All of the defendants were convicted, and sentenced to 14 days' imprisonment with hard labour. Further trials followed, all resulting in convictions and the same sentence: another 23 men from Borda on 23 September; 32 from Maimoa on 1 October; and 42 from Argyllshire on 2 October.

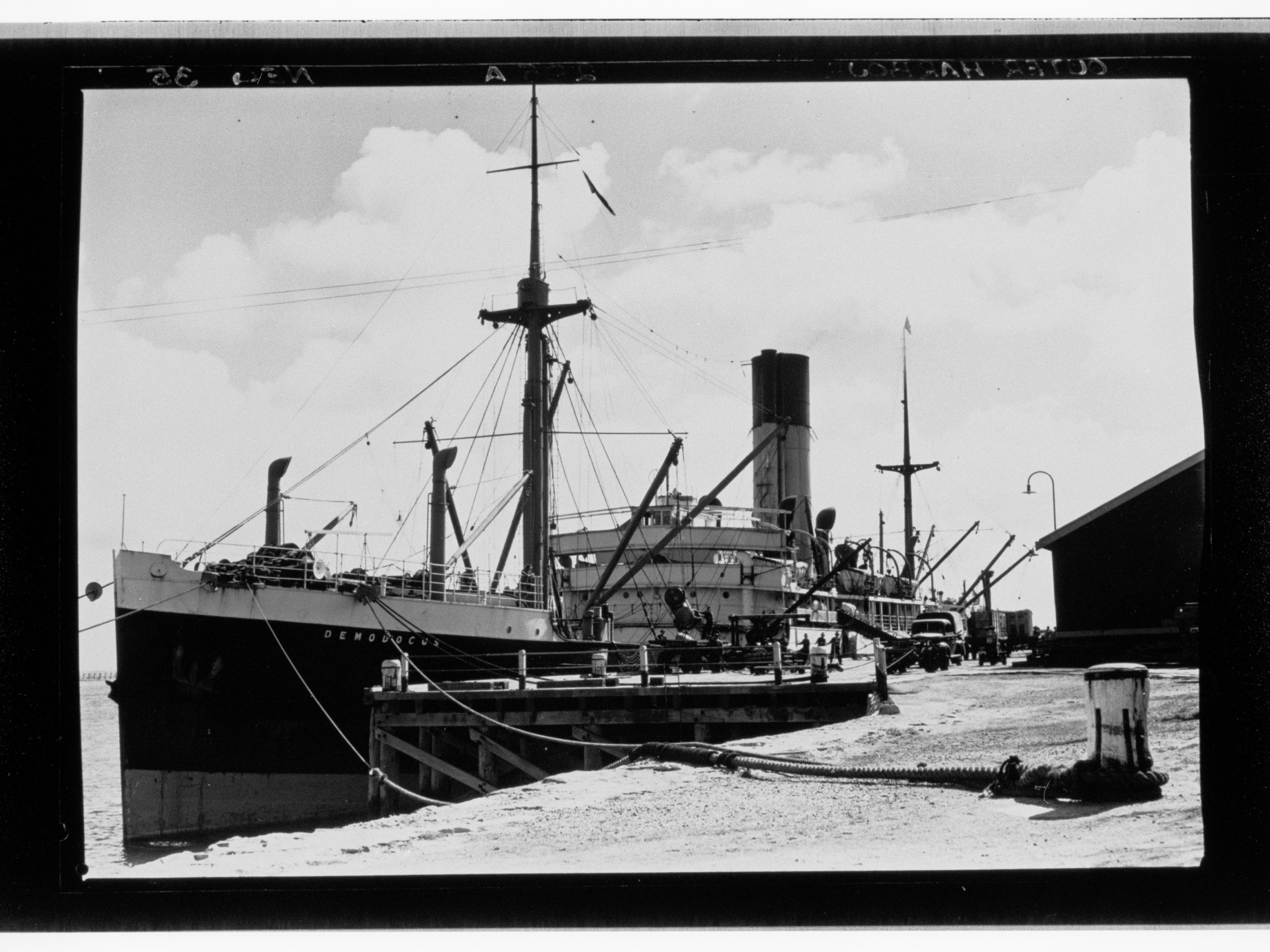
The China Mutual ship Demodocus

The China Mutual ship Demodocus arrived in Gage Roads on 26 September, and berthed at North Quay in Fremantle two days later. 200 to 300 strikers marched to the ship. Demodocus had a white deck crew and Chinese engine room crew, and both departments were persuaded to join the strike. Fremantle Harbour was now congested with strike-bound ships. The Hain steamship Trelyon reached Gage Roads from Sydney on 30 September, and entered Fremantle Harbour on 2 October. Her crew visited Fremantle Trades Hall that afternoon, and agreed to join the strike. The Union Steam Ship Company motor ship Limerick berthed at North Wharf on 6 October. Her crew attended a meeting at Fremantle Trades Hall that afternoon, and agreed to join the strike. More members of Borda's crew were convicted and sentenced on 6 October and 12 October.

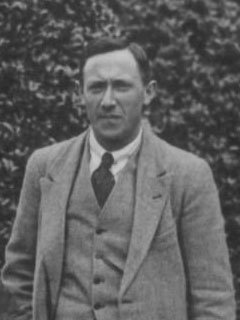
Manny Shinwell in 1923

On 12 October, the AMWU claimed that strikers in all ports except London had voted to end the strike. The AMWU's National Organiser, Manny Shinwell, declared that "no useful purpose could be served by carrying on the struggle", and that he was now focused on getting employers to agree not to victimise strikers after the dispute. The Fremantle strikers held out until the beginning of November, when most of them returned to their duties. On 2 November, Borda left the Fremantle waterfront and anchored in Gage Roads, followed by Orsova. Maimoa followed on 5 November, and tugboats moved Argyllshire on the morning of 6 November. Only about 25 strikers remained at Fremantle; most of whom were members of the strike committee.

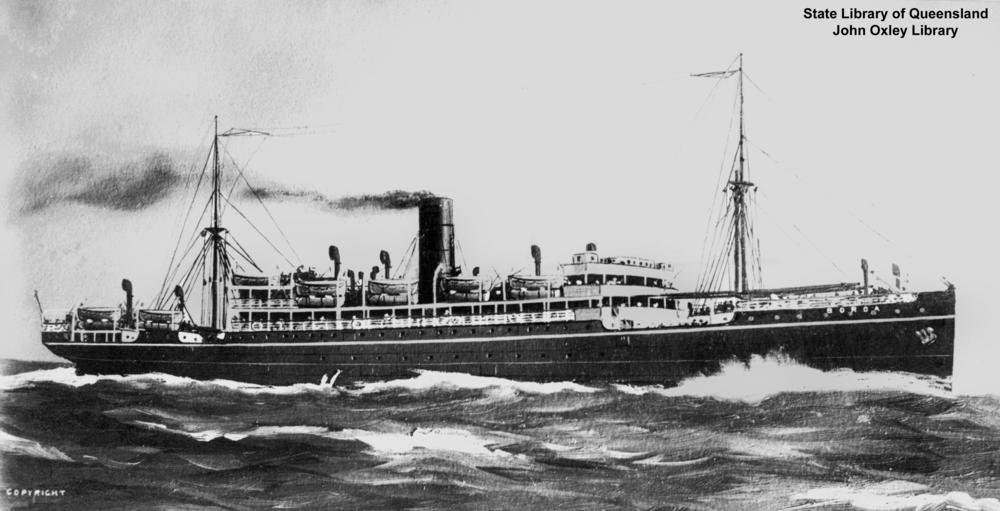
The P&O liner Borda

The strike also collapsed at Adelaide, which was Argyllshire's next port of call. However, on 18 November she reached Melbourne, where wildcat strikers were holding out. Borda had also reached Melbourne, and the strike committee tried to persuade the crews of both ships, along with that of the New Zealand Shipping Company's Kaikoura, to join the strike. On 25 November, UK seamen in Melbourne held a mass meeting, and the next day, 18 of Argyllshire's stokers did not report for duty. However, she and two other UK ships all left Melbourne for Sydney on 26 November, with new recruits replacing those men who had stayed ashore to continue the strike.

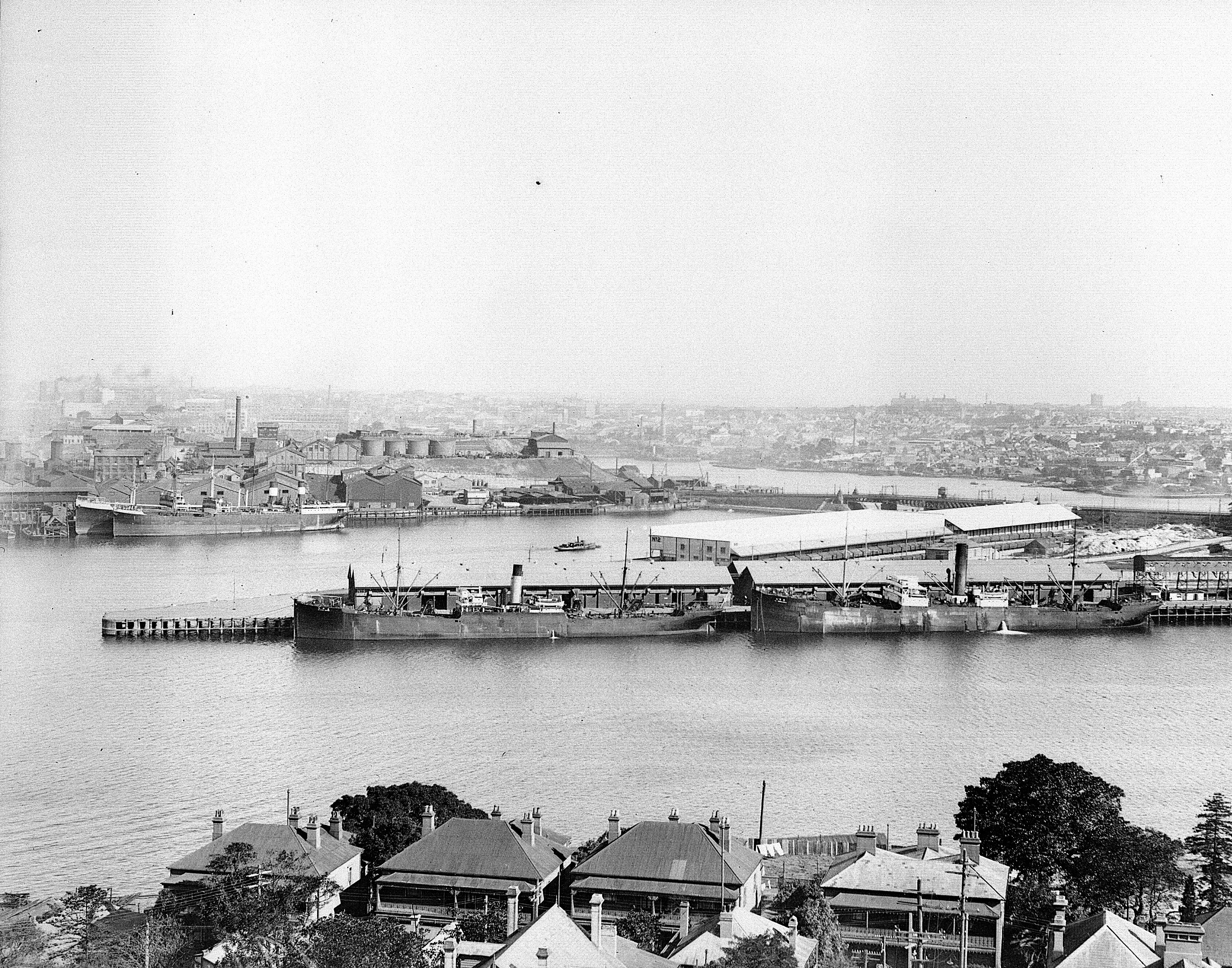
Wharves at Pyrmont in the 1920s

On 30 November 1925, Argyllshire docked at Jones Bay Wharf in Pyrmont. By 7 December she had moved to an anchorage in Athol Bight. By 2 January 1926 she was berthed at Pyrmont again, but by 3 February she was back at anchor in Athol Bight. By 10 March she was off Cremorne in North Sydney, and the next day she sailed for the UK via New Zealand. She reached Gisborne on 16 March; where she loaded meat and general cargo at anchor in the roadstead. She called at Whanganui; Timaru; Port Chalmers; Bluff; and Wellington. Her cargo included a record 19,413 cases of apples from Otago. Turnbull, Martin & Co advertised passenger berths aboard her as "saloon class only", and fares from Wellington to London ranging from £70 to £85. She left Wellington for London on 15 April; passed through the Panama Canal; called at Newport News; and on 28 May reached London. She reached London after the 1926 United Kingdom general strike had collapsed, but the associated lockout of coal miners was continuing. For a time she was laid up in the Thames; but the UK was short of coal; so she brought a cargo of coal from the US to Birkenhead.

== Consequences of the strike ==
It was reported that when Argyllshire got back to England after the strike, i.e. at the end of May 1926, Scottish Shire Line replaced her UK crew with lascars. Lascars still crewed her when she was in New Zealand in March 1928.

The Fremantle Harbour Trust Committee sued the owners of ships that had been strike-bound, because they had not paid harbour dues for the weeks that their ships were stuck in port. The shipowners made counter-claims, claiming that the Harbour Trust should have provided police protection to enable the ships to leave Fremantle. The Supreme Court of Western Australia was to hear the case, but on 25 June 1927 the parties settled out of court, and the shipowners' counter-claims were dismissed.

== Once a year round the World ==
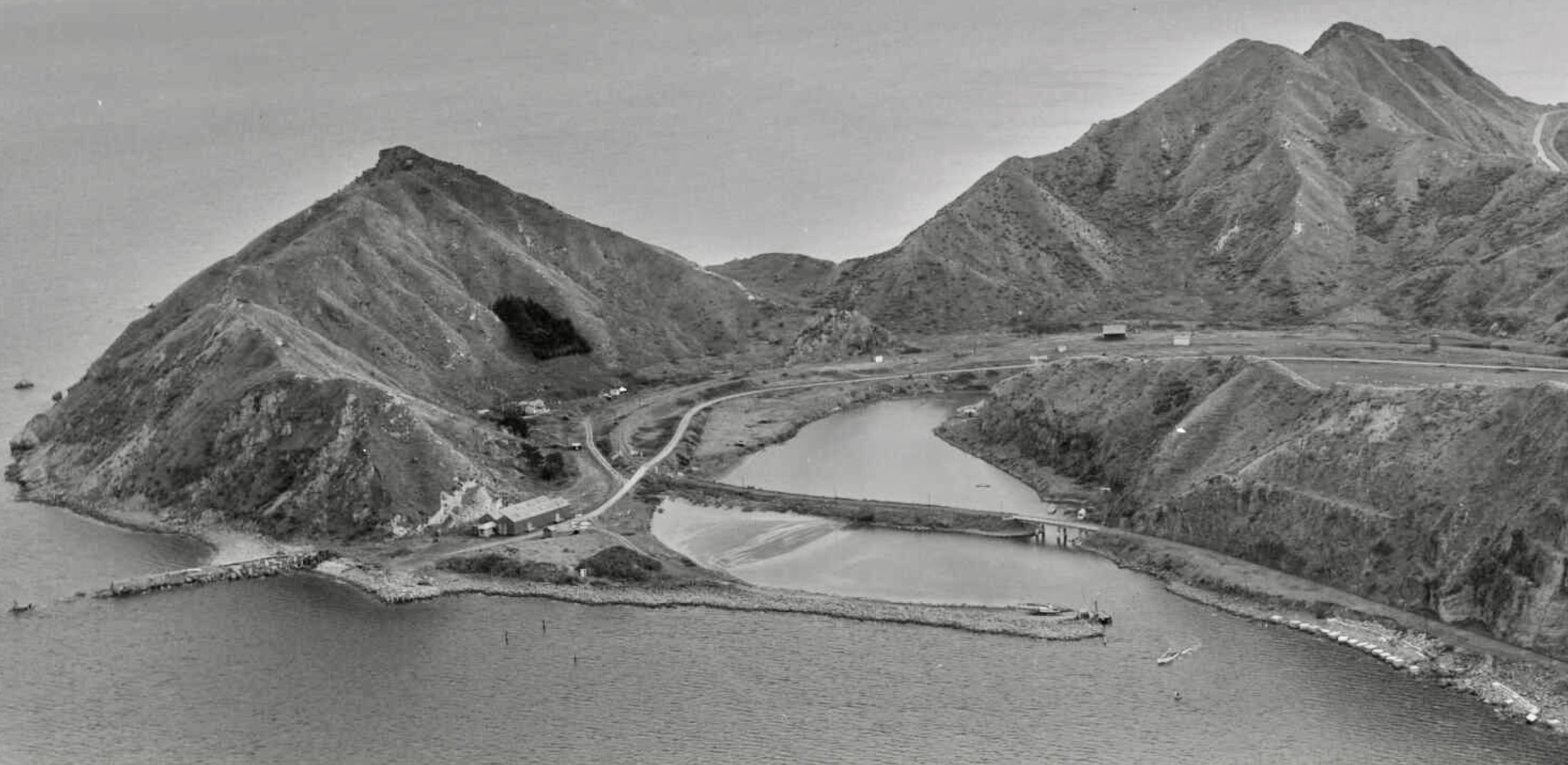
Waikokopu, on the east coast of North Island

In January 1927, Argyllshire loaded at Avonmouth and Liverpool, and sailed on 15 January for Australia via Cape Town. She called at Adelaide and Melbourne, and on 7 March reached Sydney. On 10 March she moved from a wharf in Walsh Bay to an anchorage in Athol Bight, where she remained until 15 March. On 16 March she left Sydney for London via New Zealand, where she loaded at Napier; Waikokopu; Bluff; Port Chalmers; Wellington; and Dunedin. She was too big to go alongside wharves in some of those ports. At Napier and Waikokopu, cargo was lightered out to her at anchor. Her cargo included 46,000 cases of apples for London, and 10,000 cases for Hull. Turnbull, Martin & Co advertised her passenger berths as "First-Class Accommodation for Saloon Passengers only"; and the fares ranged from £70 to £85; the same as they were a year before. On She left Wellington on 22 April; passed through the Panama Canal; and on 29 May reached London.

Argyllshire's next voyage was to be to South Africa, starting from Liverpool on 16 July 1927. Toward the end of 1927 she began her next voyage to Australia. In November she called at Glasgow and Newport, and on 10 December she left Liverpool. She called at Cape Town, and on 18 January 1928 reached Adelaide. She called at Melbourne, and on 29 January arrived in Sydney. On 3 February she left Jones' Wharf for an anchorage at Birt's Buoy. On 25 February she left Sydney for Tokomaru Bay in New Zealand. She called at Bluff; Port Chalmers or Dunedin; and on 28 March reached Wellington.

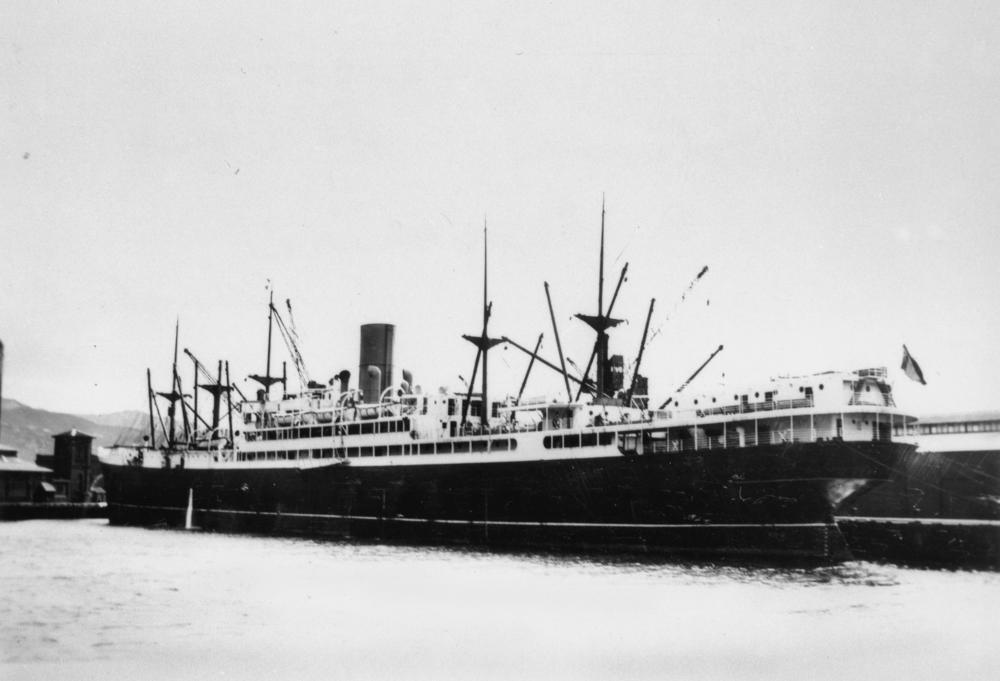
The New Zealand Shipping Co's Rotorua, the former Shropshire

In Wellington, Argyllshire and other refrigerated ships were delayed, because New Zealand suppliers failed to deliver the full amount of fruit that they had contracted to supply. One of her sister ships was also caught by the same delay: the former Shropshire, now owned by the New Zealand Shipping Company and renamed Rotorua. Turnbull, Martin & Co again advertised "First-class Accommodation for Saloon Passengers Only" aboard her for passengers to London, but this time did not advertise the fares. Argyllshire left a week late; on 11 April; for London and Hull. She sailed via the Panama Canal, and reached London on 20 May.

For part of 1928, presumably between May and November, Argyllshire was laid up at Gare Loch in Scotland. On 17 November she left Liverpool carrying general cargo. She called at Cape Town; Fremantle; Port Adelaide; Melbourne; and Sydney; and reached Brisbane on 20 January 1929. On 23 January she left Brisbane for Sydney; where she berthed in Neutral Bay; and left on 2 February. She reached Bluff on 5 February; Where she landed a party of about 30 tourists. They were to tour South Island on land, and rejoin the ship to continue the voyage before she left Wellington. She then called at Napier; Waikokopu; Gisborne; Lyttelton; and Wellington, where she arrived on 2 March. The cargo she loaded en route included frozen meat, and 16,500 cases of cheese. She left Wellington on 9 March; She passed through the Panama Canal, and on 16 April reached London.

It was not until seven months later that Argyllshire began her next voyage to Australia. She left Liverpool on 16 November 1929; passed through the Suez Canal; and reached Fremantle on 18 December. She had a new Master, Captain WJ Page, who had succeeded Captain Wallace. The passengers that she brought to Australia included 15 tourists, who were sailing around the World aboard her. The tourists included Brigadier-General Arthur Slade-Baker, CMG; and Sir Emilius Hopkinson CMG, DSO. The ship reached Port Adelaide on Christmas Day, 25 December; Melbourne on 30 December; and Sydney on 6 January 1930. By the time she reached Sydney, her tourists were reported to number about 30. Most of them disembarked at Sydney; and were to rejoin the ship later. Argyllshire's lascar stewards were Goans, and several newspapers noted that on this voyage, their uniform included a sash of the tartan of Clan Campbell, whose lands are in Argyll. The ship reached Brisbane on 13 January, and left only two days later, to return to Sydney. On 31 January, the ship left Sydney for New Zealand.

== Federal Steam voyage and laying up ==
At the beginning of February 1930, it was reported that the New Zealand Shipping Company (NZSC) had bought Argyllshire. The price was £145,000. In fact, NZSC allocated the ship to FSNC, which it had taken over in 1912. Her sisters Shropshire and Wiltshire had been built for FSNC. Wiltshire had been wrecked in 1922. Shropshire had been transferred to NZSC in 1923, and renamed Rotorua.

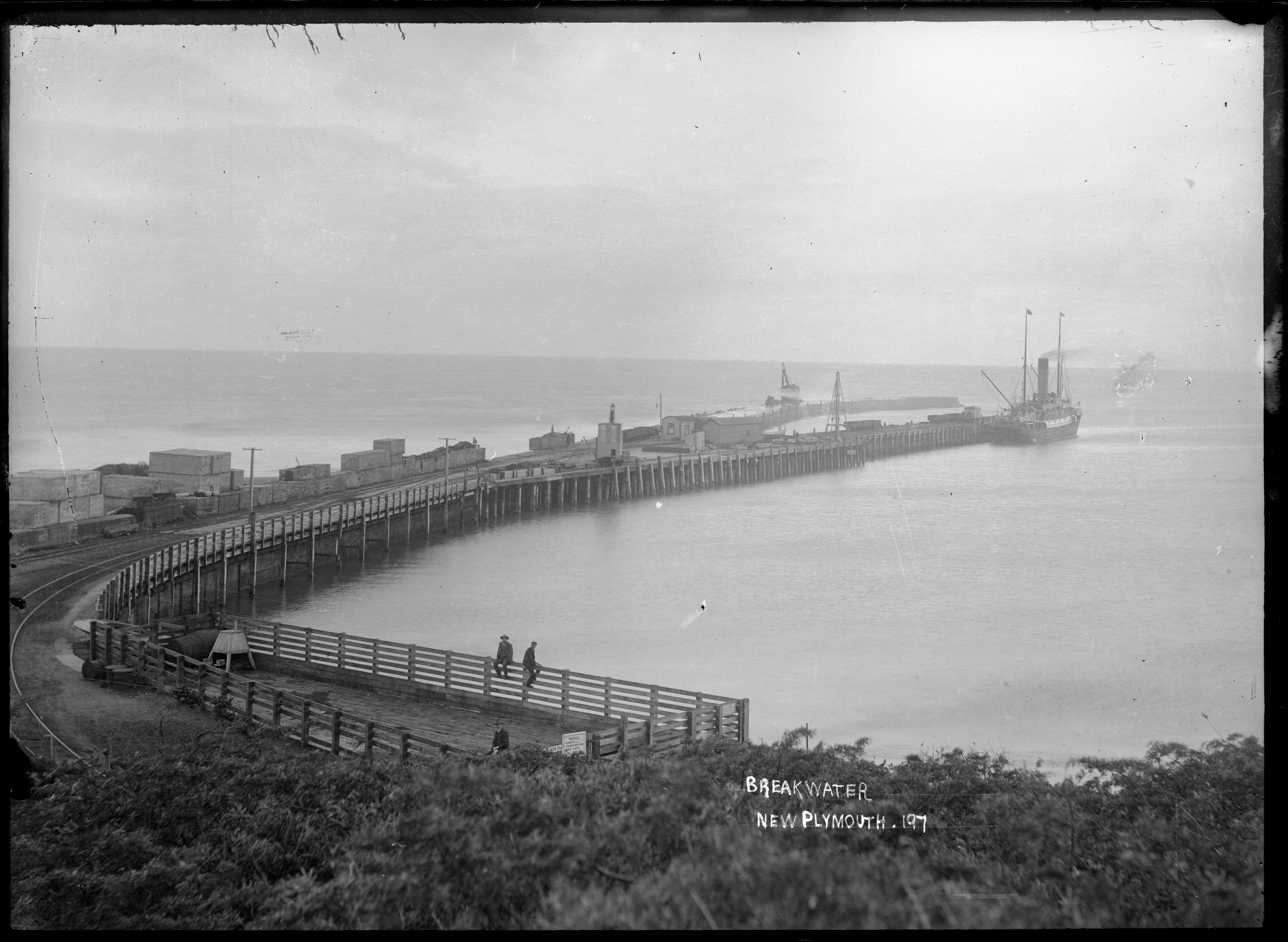
The jetty at New Plymouth

On 4 February 1930, Argyllshire arrived in Bluff. She called at Port Chalmers; Wanganui; New Plymouth; Gisborne; Wellington; Picton; and Lyttelton. She left Lyttelton on 13 March; passed through the Panama Canal; and on 19 April arrived in Southampton.

Argyllshire began her next voyage by leaving Swansea on 8 May 1930. She loaded at Liverpool, where she left on 24 May. She passed through the Panama Canal, and a week later, one of her lascar coal trimmers died. The ship was stopped; one of the serangs conducted an Islamic funeral for him; and he was buried at sea in the Pacific Ocean. The ship reached Auckland on 30 June. She continued to Wellington; Lyttelton; Port Chalmers; New Plymouth; Wanganui; Wellington; Napier; and Gisborne. She returned to Auckland, where on 28 August she left on her return voyage to England. Her cargo from New Zealand to England included 20,500 boxes of butter, and 9,500 crates of cheese. She passed through the Panama Canal, and on 12 October 1930 reached Avonmouth.

From October 1930, FSNC seems to have laid up Argyllshire for 16 months. It was later reported that she had been laid up in the Thames.

== Tasmanian fruit shipment ==
Early in 1932, Scottish Shire Line chartered her for one voyage to bring Tasmanian fruit to Britain. She left Glasgow on 20 February; sailed via the Cape of Good Hope; and called at Port Pirie on 12 April. She started loading at Port Huon, in Hospital Bay, where she embarked 73,000 cases of apples and pears. By 22 April she was at Hobart, where she was to load 80,000 cases of fruit. On 28 April she reached Bell Bay, where she moored at Beauty Point. At the time, she was the largest ship ever to visit the Tamar River, as Garrow Rock was a hazard to navigation, which prevented any ship longer than Argyllshire from entering the river. There she loaded 29,829 cases of apples; 311 cases of pears; 162 tons of peas; and 140 tons of butter. Her total fruit cargo was 192,752 cases. On 30 April she left Tasmania, and on 6 May she called at Fremantle, where she loaded timber, and 4,579 cases of apples. She sailed via the Cape of Good Hope, and on 17 June reached London. She continued to Liverpool, where she arrived on 30 June to discharge the remainder of her cargo.

Argyllshire was one of ten ships that, between them, landed 712,400 cases of Tasmanian apples in England within the space of two weeks. 240,000 cases of New Zealand apples were landed at the same time, and some of the ships coming from Tasmania also brought fruit from South Australia and Western Australia. The ships reached England just as English strawberries were ripe. That year's strawberry crop was large; which depressed prices; and this in turn depressed wholesale prices for apples. Argyllshire's apples were found to be over-ripe, and her pears were even worse. Growers and FOB buyers alike incurred heavy losses. Tasmania's State Fruit Advisory Board (SFAB) investigated; found shortcomings in Argyllshire's refrigeration system; and concluded that there was a case to seek compensation from her owners. Wastage of some apple varieties was 25 to 50 percent. Dessert pears were all ruined. Only the hard, green cooking varieties of pear were still in good condition.

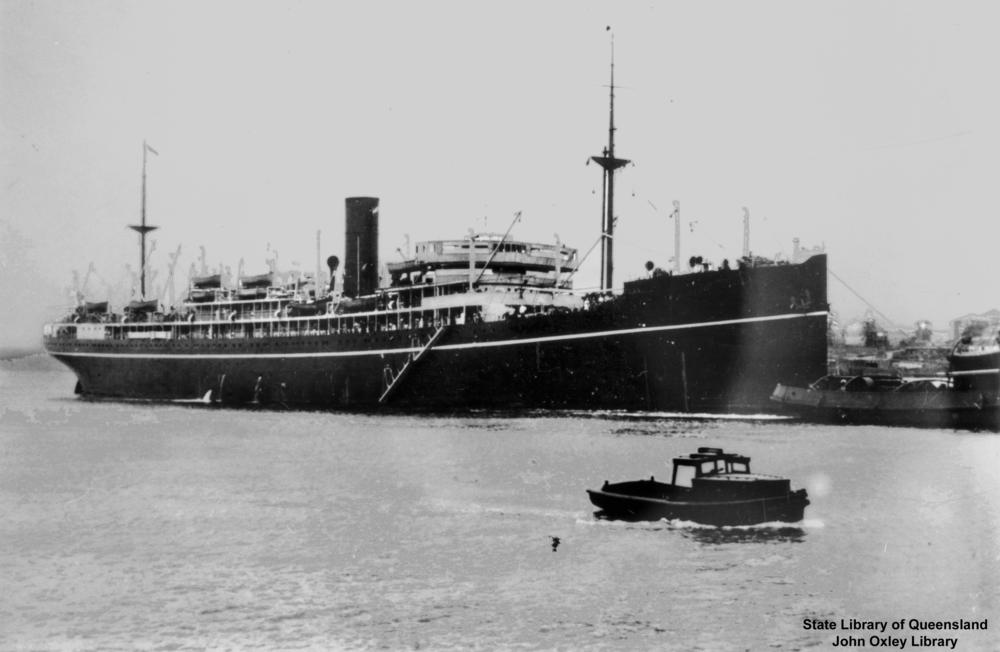
The P&O liner Baradine

Argyllshire was not the only refrigerated cargo ship whose Tasmanian fruit crop reached Britain in poor condition that year. Only on a minority of ships did all of the fruit cargo arrive in a condition reported as "good" or "very fair". On many ships, the condition was described as "variable", and on some, there was a significant amount of waste. About a week behind Argyllshire, Royal Mail Steam Packet Company's Natia brought even more Tasmanian fruit than did Argyllshire. Many of Natia's apples were spoiled by "brown heart", and her cargo fetched an even lower price per case than did Argyllshire's. Many of the apples on Natia's sister ship Navasota, and some of those on Furness, Houlder Argentine Lines' Canonesa, also had "brown heart". The P&O liner Baradine's fruit cargo was "variable", and was sold almost as cheaply as Argyllshire's. However, Argyllshire's cargo was among the worst. One Tasmanian wholesaler said that it had been reported as "positively the worst cargo which has arrived in London within the period of living memory". There was an official report into the entire shipment of Tasmanian fruit in 1932; not only that aboard Argyllshire. It set out three possible failings: that some of the fruit was below standard before it was loaded; that fruit cases were stowed too close together in ships' holds, thus impeding proper ventilation; and that refrigerating machinery may have been defective.

== Cargo compensation claims ==
FSNC admitted that when Argyllshire left Tasmania, part of her refrigerating equipment "broke down temporarily". However, the breakdown lasted less than 24 hours, which allowed the underwriters to reject any insurance claim for the fruit. FSNC also rejected all compensation claims, alleging that the fruit was too ripe before it was loaded. A Huon Valley local councillor suggested that the ship being laid up for 16 months could have contributed to her refrigerating equipment falling out of good repair. The SFAB also noted that discharging part of a refrigerated hold at one port, and later discharging the remainder at another port, as Argyllshire had done in London and Liverpool, was not best practice. In December 1932, the SFAB advanced £8,517 to the Fruit-growers' Defence Fund to help to fund a lawsuit against FSNC.

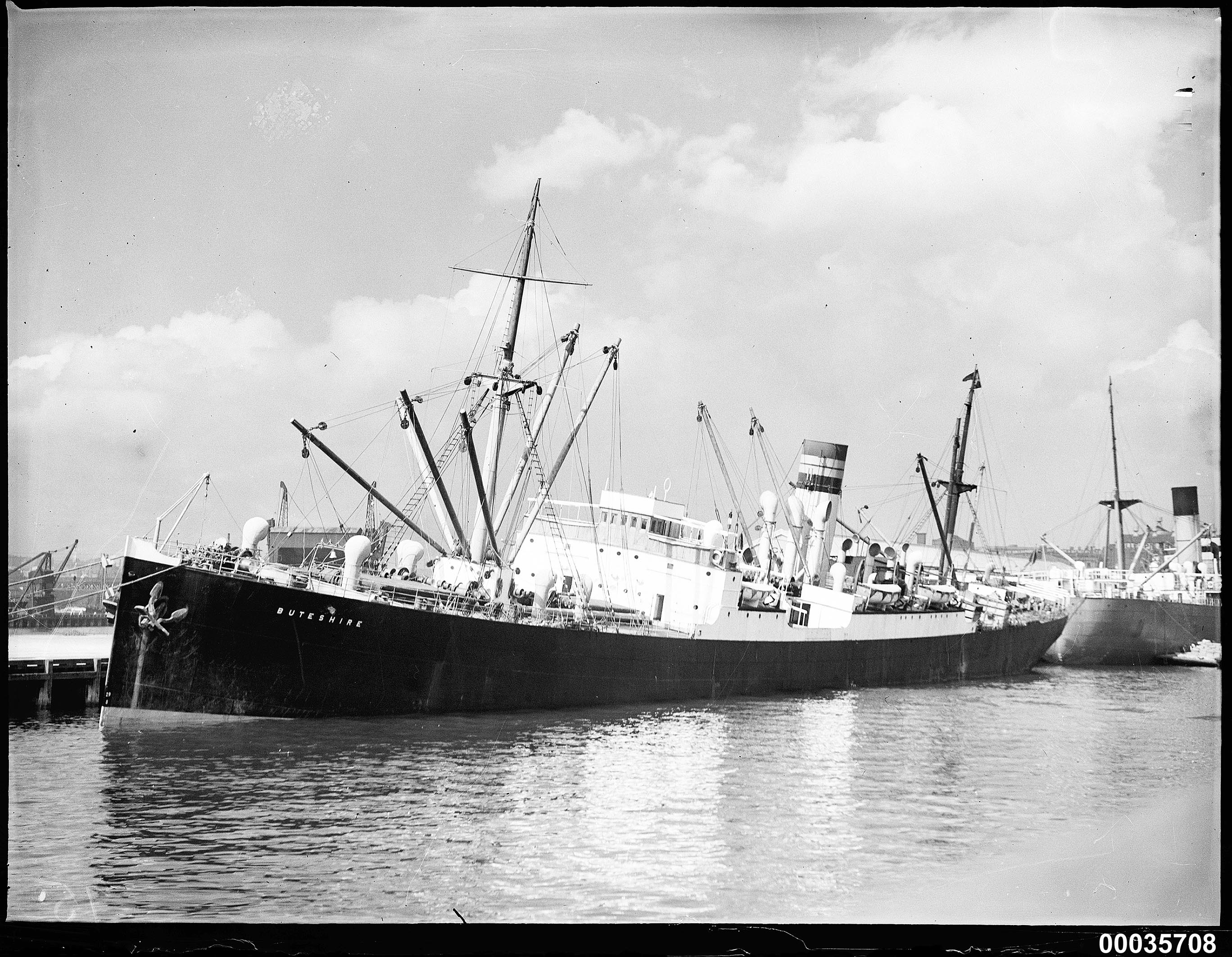
Scottish Shire Line's Buteshire

By late March in 1933, underwriters had started to honour insurance claims for Argyllshire's fruit. By late April, two-thirds of the claims had been paid. Underwriters settled on the basis that, in good condition, apples should have sold for ten shillings per case; and they paid the difference between this and the actual prices realised. Late in May 1933, the SFAB reported that "most" of the Argyllshire claims had been met, or were to be met. It passed on advice from the Salvage Association in London that all remaining claims must be lodged by 16 June 1933. In the 1933 fruit season, Tasmanian pears shipped to Britain aboard Scottish Shire Line's Buteshire were also spoiled. The SFAB found that there was significant variation between the different Lloyd's insurance policies that had been taken out on Argyllshire's cargo. Toward the end of June 1933, the SFAB recommended that such policies be standardised.

== Clan Urquhart ==
On 15 November 1932, FSNC sold Argyllshire to Clan Line, who renamed her Clan Urquhart. Clan Line had the ship overhauled, and spent more than £20,000 on reconditioning and improving her refrigerating machinery. The sale was announced in January 1933. By the time of her sale, her passenger accommodation was 66 berths for first class (or saloon class) passengers. However, Clan Line carried few passengers. Instead, The first class cabins on her port side were stripped out, and replaced with a garage for the export of 40 cars. She was equipped with a special sling to load and unload each car. The first class cabins on her starboard side became officers' quarters; and her passenger didning saloon, lounges, and smoking room also became facilities for the officers. Her Master and Chief Officer each had a suite of five rooms. Her Second; Third; and Fourth Officer; and her Wireless Officer; each got his own former cabin-de-luxe. She carried nine engineers, including refrigerating engineers; and each had a three-room suite. She carried deck cadets, each of whom had a single-berth cabin. In keeping with her new name, the ship flew a flag of Clan Urquhart tartan from her jackstaff.

Clan Line appointed a Scot, Captain George Young, as her Master. He had been with Clan line since 1908, and had survived the sinking of Clan Macmillan by UB-39 in the English Channel in 1917. His next command was Clan McKenzie, which a UB-30 damaged by torpedo in 1918. But she stayed afloat; her crew used the 4.7-inch (120 mm) defensive gun on her poop to repel her attacker; and was later towed to safety. For saving his ship, Captain Young was awarded Lloyd's Medal for Meritorious Service, and the London War Risks Insurance Association formally commended his "seamanlike skill and devotion to duty". He remained her Master for the next 15 years. A piece of the torpedo that struck Clan McKenzie was found in her engine room, and Captain Young kept it as a souvenir. In 1934, Clan Line made him vice-Commodore of its fleet.

Early in 1933, Clan Urquhart left the UK for Australia. She called at Beira in Portuguese East Africa, and on 21 March reached Sydney, where she loaded fruit and other cargo. She continued loading at Melbourne, where Captain Young gave his Muslim lascars a day off to celebrate Eid al-Adha. On 8 April she left Melbourne, carrying 190,000 to 200,000 cases of fruit; 40,000 cases of dried fruit; 1,500 tons of grain; 1,750 bales of wool; 1,250 tons of lead; 300 bales of sheepskins; 552 tons of flour; and ten tons of tallow. She called at Durban, and on 27 May reached London.

== Holed off Queensland ==
Clan Urquhart's next voyage to Australia was in August 1933. On 5 September she reached Port Pirie, where she loaded lead. From there she headed for Townsville, but on 12 September, as she was approaching Cape Moreton to pick up a coastal pilot, she struck a submerged object. Water entered her numbers one, two and three holds; rose to a depth of 12 feet (4 m) in number two hold; and she started to list to starboard. She diverted to Pinkenba Wharf, on the Brisbane River. Two centrifugal pumps were brought from Brisbane, which by 14 September had cleared the water from the holds. A diver found that one of her hull plates on her port side had been fractured, and the plating had been displaced by 12 inches (0.3 m). The diver fitted patches over her damaged plates, as temporary repairs.

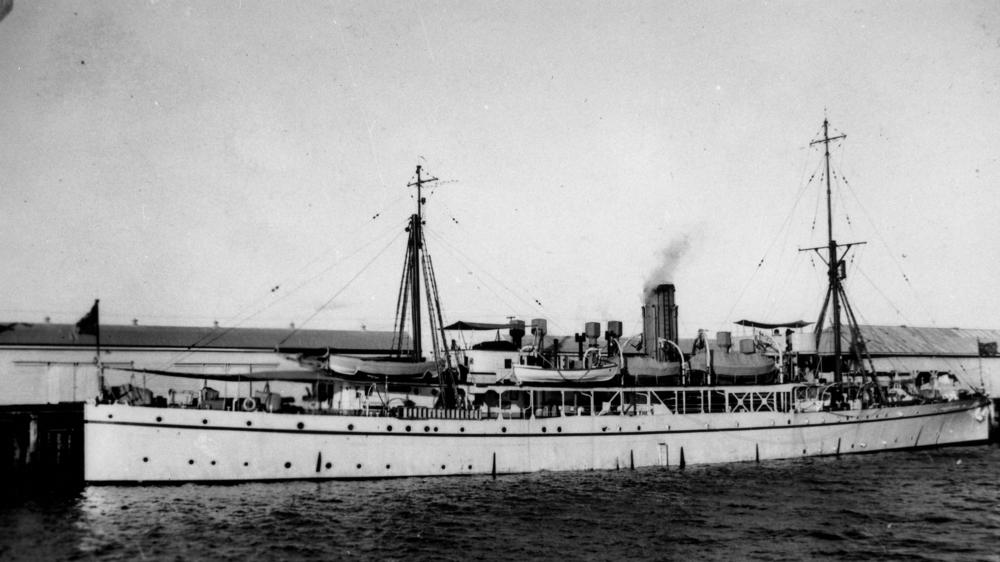
HMAS Moresby

The deputy director of Navigation and Lighthouses in Brisbane issued a notice, advising ships to avoid the area between Smith Rock light buoy and Brennan Shoal. On 25 September, HMAS Moresby began survey of the area, to find the obstruction that Argyllshire had struck. She found that the light buoy that was meant to mark Smith Rock had drifted north by about a quarter of a mile. Clan Urquhart had thus struck Smith Rock. In 1909, the BISN steamship Waipara had been wrecked on the same rock.

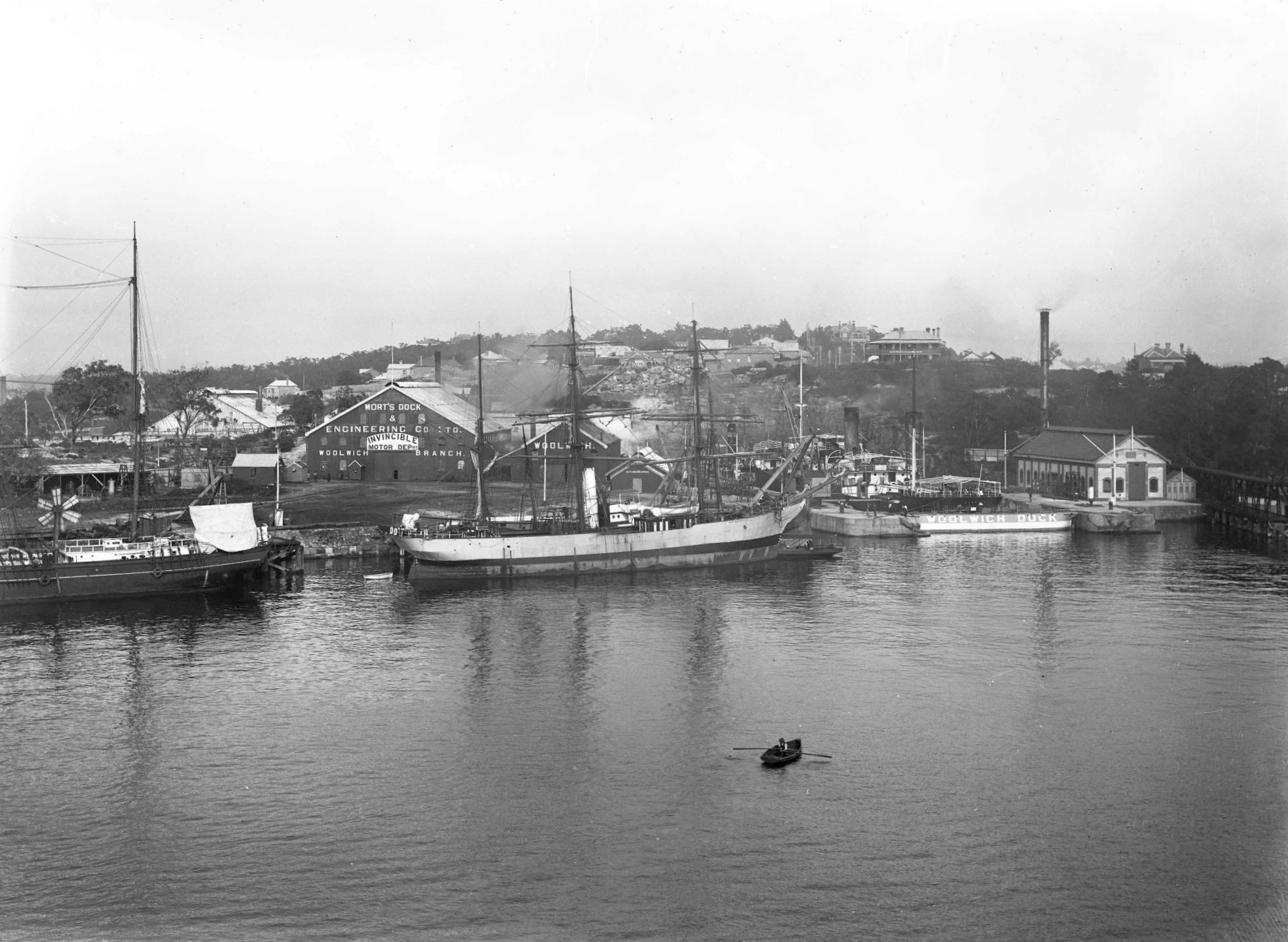
Woolwich Dock in Sydney

On 22 September, Argyllshire arrived in Sydney, where she was dry docked in Woolwich Dock for permanent repairs. On 17 October she left Sydney to bunker at Newcastle, and then resume her voyage north. She loaded 1,500 tons of sugar at Townsville, and 400 tons of frozen beef at Port Alma, before calling at Eagle Street Wharf in Brisbane, On her return voyage south she again bunkered at Newcastle, She continued loading at Sydney; Melbourne; and Fremantle; where she left for Europe on 22 November. She passed through the Suez Canal; reached Hull on 27 December; and in January 1934 continued to discharge at London and Glasgow.

== Further voyages ==
Early in 1934, Clan Urquhart started from Glasgow, and on 7 April she reached Newcastle, New South Wales. She continued to Brisbane, where she loaded at Hamilton Cold Stores and Thomas Borthwick & Co's Wharf. She returned via Sydney, where she berthed at Woolloomooloo. There she loaded cargo including 1,256 carcasses of mutton; 4,034 carcasses of lamb; and 3,533 boxes of butter. On 17 April she reached Hobart; where the next day, Clan Line's local agent, AG Webster & Sons, entertained 28 fruit exporters to lunch aboard her. The agents, and Captain Young, sought to reassure exporters that Clan Line had had the ship's refrigerating system reconditioned and improved; that it was now the most up to date; and since the overhaul, its frozen cargoes had arrived in excellent condition. She next called at Station Pier in Port Melbourne, where she was to load wool and general cargo. She returned via Durban; reached London on 11 June; and on 17 June continued discharging at Hull.

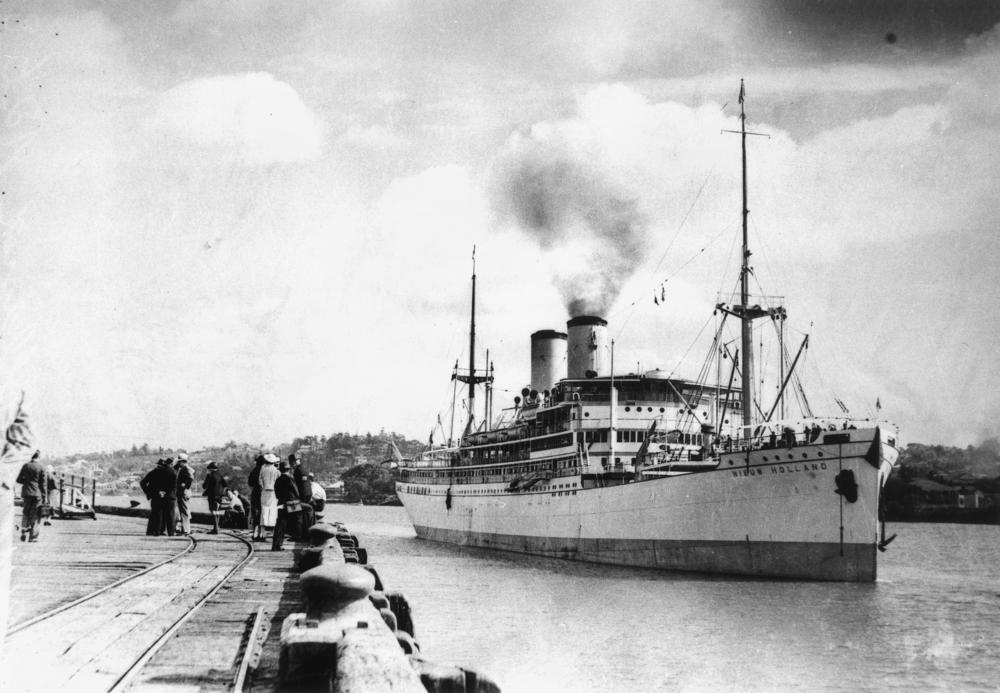
KPM's liner Nieuw Holland arriving in Brisbane

On 8 December 1934, Clan Urquhart left Liverpool for Australia. She reached Fremantle on 14 January 1935; and then Adelaide; Melbourne; and Sydney, where she berthed at Ball's Head Wharf, and later was to move to Pyrmont. On 2 or 3 February 1935, she arrived off Cape Moreton. She had difficulty in summoning a pilot to take her upriver to Brisbane, because the local pilot steamer was not equipped with wireless telegraph. The procedure was for an arriving ship to signal to the wireless telegraph station at Perth; which would then telephone Moreton Island; whence the pilot steamer would then be sent. However, storms on 31 January and 1 February had broken the telephone line to Moreton Island, and it had not yet been repaired. The Koninklijke Paketvaart-Maatschappij passenger liner Nieuw Holland, and the Norddeutscher Lloyd cargo ship Aller, were also delayed for the same reason. At Brisbane, the Clan Urquhart berthed at New Farm.

By 9 February 1935, Clan Urquhart was in Townsville, where she discharged 380 tons of general cargo, and loaded 1,000 tons of silver lead bullion, and 350 tons of sugar. On 12 February, she arrived in Brisbane; carrying 15 passengers in saloon class and 24 in steerage; all but three of them destined for ports further south. She was to load 260 tons of frozen meat at Brett's Hamilton Wharf, but a strike at Brisbane Abattoir prevented her. After laying idle for three days, she left Brisbane on 15 February, leaving the frozen meat behind. She called at Newcastle, where she bunkered with 2,000 tons of coal, and loaded 1,600 sacks of flour and 135 drums of tallow. The flour was a 100-ton consignment from G Fielder & Co's mill in Tamworth. She called at Sydney, where she berthed at Woolloomooloo; and Hobart, where she loaded 30,011 boxes of fruit. She called at Station Pier in Melbourne, where she loaded wool; refrigerated produce; and general cargo. She called at Fremantle, where she left on 15 or 16 March. She called at Aden; passed through the Suez Canal; and on 17 April she reached London. On 4 May she reached Manchester, and on 10 May she reached Glasgow.

Clan Urquhart's next voyage to Australia was a few months later. She started from Liverpool; and one day later, a stowaway announced himself to one of the deck cadets. He was a veteran of the Australian Field Artillery, who in 1916 had sailed on the ship from Australia to France when she was Argyllshire. He had lived in Britain and mainland Europe, and now wanted to return home to Australia. Captain Young put him to work. The ship called at Beira, where she left on 19 October 1935; and sailed around the north coast of Australia, passing the Torres Strait Islands on 10 November. Two days later she reached Townsville; where she loaded frozen meat, and silver lead bullion. She called at Bowen, where she loaded 2,000 tons of sugar. At Brisbane she berthed at Brett's Wharf; loaded at Hamilton Cold Stores; and left with cargo including 2,597 boxes of butter. At Newcastle she berthed at Lee Wharf, where Australian immigration authorities allowed her stowaway to enter the country. She continued to Sydney; Port Melbourne; Adelaide; and Fremantle, where she left on 20 December. Her cargo included wool for Dunkirk, Antwerp, and Liverpool; flour for Antwerp, London, and Hull, barley for London and Glasgow; and wine for Glasgow, Liverpool, and Manchester. She sailed via the Cape of Good Hope; reaching Dunkirk on 28 January 1936; Hull on 7 February; and Manchester on 11 February.

== Final voyage ==
Clan Urquhart was due to leave Liverpool for Australia on 7 March 1936. By 13 March she was at Lourenço Marques in Portuguese East Africa. However, on 29 July it was announced that Clan Line had sold her to Thos. W. Ward for scrap. On 30 October 1936, she reached Briton Ferry in Wales to be broken up. On 14 March 1937, fire broke out during shipbreaking work. She was scuttled in shallow water to help put out the fire. Demolition continued where she lay. Her registry entry was closed on 12 October 1937.

== Bibliography ==
- Clarkson, John; Fenton, Roy; Munro, Archie (2007). Clan Line Illustrated Fleet History. Preston: Ships in Focus Publications. ISBN 978-1-901703-47-4.
- Gray, Leonard; Lingwood, John (1975). The Doxford Turret Ships. Kendal: World Ship Society. ISBN 0-9500044-6-4.
- Haws, Duncan (1985). New Zealand Shipping Co. & Federal S.N. Co. Merchant Fleets. Vol. 7. Burwash: Travel Creatours Ltd Publications. ISBN 0-946378-02-9.
- Haws, Duncan (1997). Clan, Houston, Turnbull Martin & Scottish Tankers. Merchant Fleets. Vol. 33. Pembroke. ISBN 0-946378-32-0.
- Haws, Duncan (2000). Manchester Liners, Houlders Bros., Alexander and Prince Lines. Merchant Fleets. Vol. 38. Pembroke. ISBN 0-946378-39-8.
- Lloyd's Register of British and Foreign Shipping. Vol. I.–Sailing Vessels, &c. London: Lloyd's Register of Shipping. 1912 – via Internet Archive.
- Lloyd's Register of British Shipping. Vol. II.–Steamers. London: Lloyd's Register of Shipping. 1912 – via Internet Archive.
- Lloyd's Register of British Shipping. Vol. II.–Steamers and Motorships. London: Lloyd's Register of Shipping. 1928 – via Internet Archive.
- Lloyd's Register of British Shipping (PDF). Vol. II.–Steamers and Motorships of 300 tons gross and over. London: Lloyd's Register of Shipping. 1930 – via Southampton City Council.
- Lloyd's Register of British Shipping (PDF). Vol. II.–Steamers and Motorships of 300 tons gross and over. London: Lloyd's Register of Shipping. 1933 – via Southampton City Council.
- Lloyd's Register of British Shipping (PDF). Vol. II.–Steamers and Motorships of 300 tons gross and over. London: Lloyd's Register of Shipping. 1934 – via Southampton City Council.
- The Marconi Press Agency Ltd (1914). The Year Book of Wireless Telegraphy and Telephony. London: The Marconi Press Agency Ltd.
- Mercantile Navy List. London: Registrar General of Shipping and Seamen. 1930 – via Crew List Index Project.
