= SS Clan Urquhart =

Three ships have been named after the Scottish Clan Urquhart:

- SS Clan Urquhart (1899), a turret deck ship scrapped in 1929;
- SS Clan Urquhart (1911), launched as Argyllshire, and renamed Clan Urquhart in 1932;
- SS Clan Urquhart (1944), which was scrapped in 1966.
