= John Slade-Baker =

English soldier, journalist and spy

John Bigelow Slade-Baker (1896–1966) was an English soldier, journalist and spy.

== Life ==
John Slade-Baker was born on 29 July 1896, the son of Brig. Gen. Arthur Slade-Baker, CMG, and Caroline Fisher Heape, of Robertsbridge. He was educated at Marlborough College before going on to the Royal Military College, Sandhurst. He rose to the rank of Colonel in the army, retiring in 1947.

From 1952 to 1960 he was Middle East correspondent for The Sunday Times. According to James Barr, Slade-Baker was an MI6 agent. In 1955, with Britain and Saudi Arabia at loggerheads over the Buraimi Dispute, he persuaded St. John Philby to depict the corruption of the Saudi royal family for The Sunday Times.

The Israeli politician Moshe Sharett was unimpressed upon meeting Slade-Baker in 1955:

... quite a strange type of a journalist is he. Seemed to me as rather limited and even a moron. He asked highly simplistic questions and slowly took down [everything] word by word. In the end, his meticulousness and carefulness outweighed his slowness and dumbness. Who knows whether his obtuse visage and cumbersome behavior were indeed a true mirror of his wisdom?

Slade-Baker died in London on 19 April 1966. His diaries and papers relating to the Middle East are held at the Middle East Centre Archive, St Antony's College, Oxford.
