= HMAT Shropshire =

Australia troopship, launched 1911

Shropshire / Rotorua
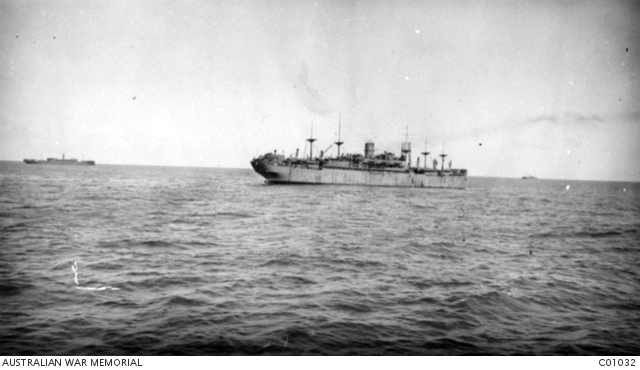
- The transport ship Shropshire carrying troops to England

History

New Zealand
- Name: Shropshire
- Operator: Federal Steam Navigation Company
- Builder: John Brown & Company, Clydebank, Glasgow, Scotland
- Yard number: 400
- Launched: 27 April 1911
- Completed: 19 September 1911
- Maiden voyage: 1912
- In service: 28 October 1911
- Out of service: 1923
- Fate: Transferred to the New Zealand Shipping Company

New Zealand
- Name: Rotorua
- Operator: New Zealand Shipping Company
- Acquired: 1923
- Out of service: 11 December 1940
- Fate: Torpedoed and sunk on 11 December 1940

General characteristics
- Class & type: Passenger/cargo steamship
- Tonnage: 11,911 tons
- Length: 526 ft 5 in (160.45 m)
- Beam: 61 ft 5 in (18.72 m)
- Depth of hold: 33 ft 4 in (10.16 m)
- Propulsion: Twin screw
- Speed: 14 knots (26 km/h; 16 mph)

HMAT Shropshire (His Majesty's Australian Transport), originally SS Shropshire, was a 11,911-ton vessel, built by John Brown and Company in Clydebank, Glasgow, for the Federal Steam Navigation Company. She was employed on passenger and meat trade between New Zealand and Great Britain, but due to the First World War, she was converted into a troopship. She was leased by the Australian Commonwealth Government until 5 August 1917, when the British Admiralty took over control of the ship.

== Time as a troopship ==
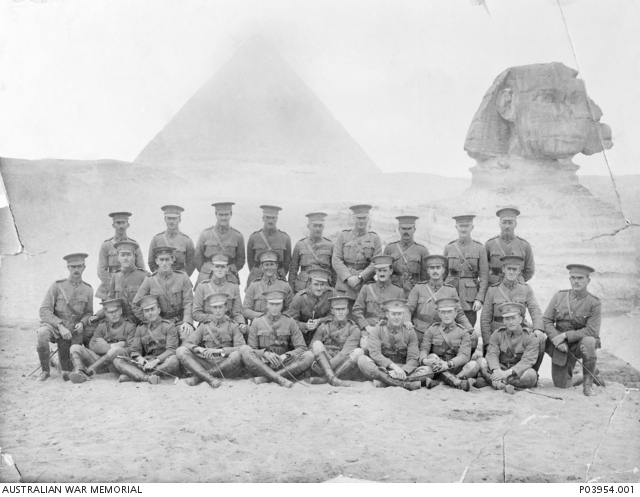
Group portrait of officers of the Australian Field Artillery, in front of the Great Sphinx and pyramids at Giza, Egypt. All the officers embarked on HMAT Shropshire from Melbourne on 20 October 1914.

HMAT Shropshire undertook the following journeys as a troopship in World War I:

- 20 October 1914 from Melbourne
- 17/20 March 1915 from Sydney/Melbourne to Alexandria
- 20 August 1915 from Sydney
- 31 March 1916 from Fremantle to Port Suez
- 25 September 1916 from Melbourne
- 11 May 1917 from Melbourne

== Later use and fate ==
In 1923, the ship was renamed Rotorua for the New Zealand Shipping Company. On 11 December 1940, it became a casualty of World War Two, when it was torpedoed by the German U-boat submarine U-49 off St Kilda, with 104 rescued and 21 lives lost.

== See also ==
- SS Rotorua (1910)
