= SS Rimutaka =

A number of steamships have been named the SS Rimutaka after the Rimutaka Mountains in New Zealand:

- SS Rimutaka (1884), a 4,473-ton three-masted sail and steam ship operated by the New Zealand Shipping Company until 1899
- SS Rimutaka (1900), a 7,765-ton liner of the New Zealand Shipping Company, operated until 1929
- SS Rimutaka (1922), a passenger-cargo ocean liner owned by P&O and operated by the New Zealand Shipping Company 1938–1950 (formerly the SS Mongolia (1922)

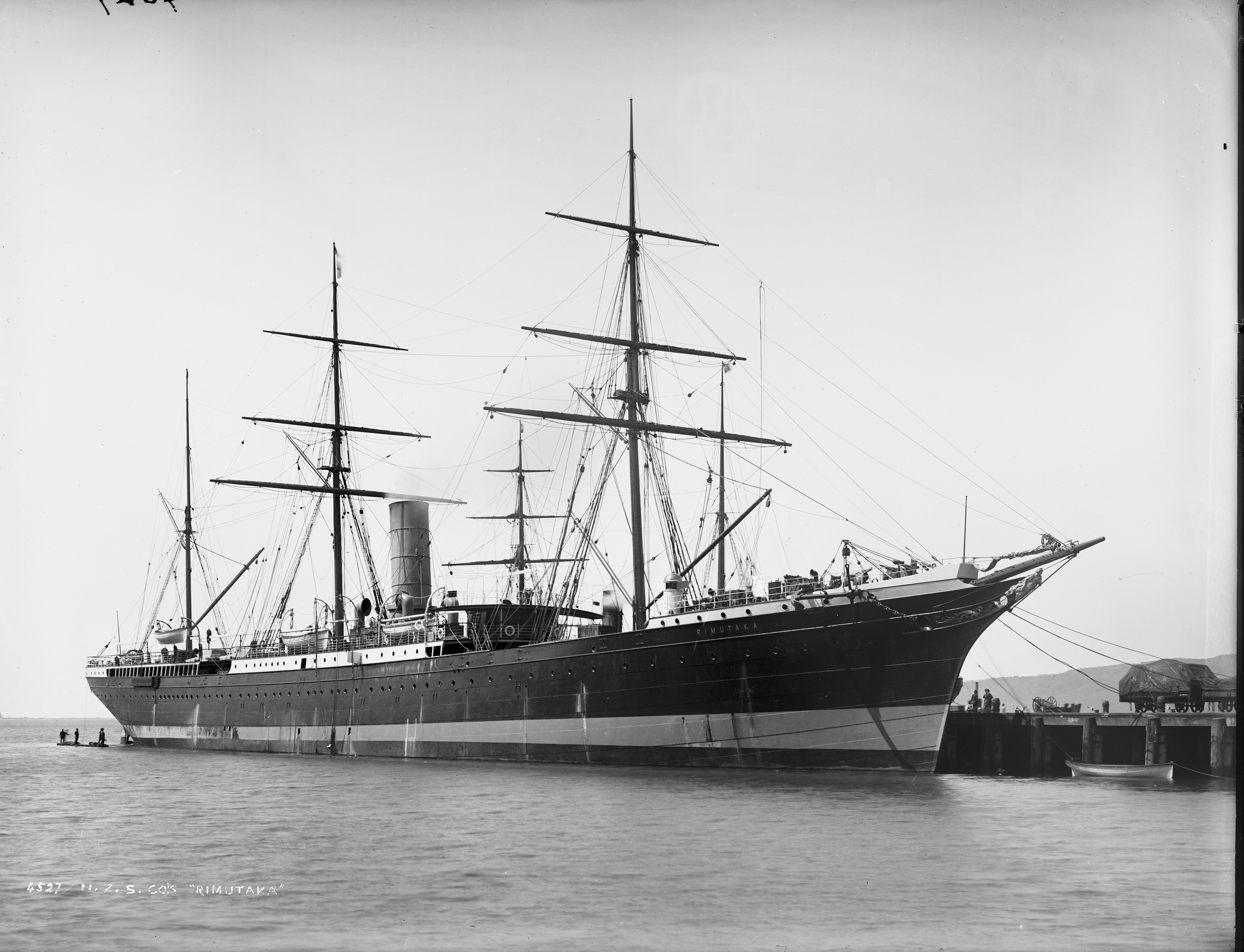
SS Rimutaka 1884
