= List of ships named Otaki =

Ōtaki is a coastal town in the North Island, New Zealand, near the mouth of the Ōtaki River. The New Zealand Shipping Company has given the name to four successive ships:

- Otaki (1875), a 1,053 GRT ship built in 1875, sold and renamed in 1892.
- SS Otaki (1908), a refrigerated cargo steamship built in Scotland in 1908 and sunk by a German merchant raider in 1917.
- Otaki, launched in 1919. She was planned as War Jupiter, a 7,951 GRT Type G2 war standard cargo ship for the UK Shipping Controller. The NZ Shipping Co bought her, had her completed as a refrigerated cargo ship and renamed her Otaki. She was sold to Clan Line and renamed SS Clan Robertson in 1934.
- MV Otaki (1952), a 10,934 GRT refrigerated motor ship. She was transferred to Federal Steam and renamed Mahmoud in 1976 and Natalia in 1979, and scrapped in 1984.
