= SS Suffolk (1899) =

British steamship that was wrecked in 1900

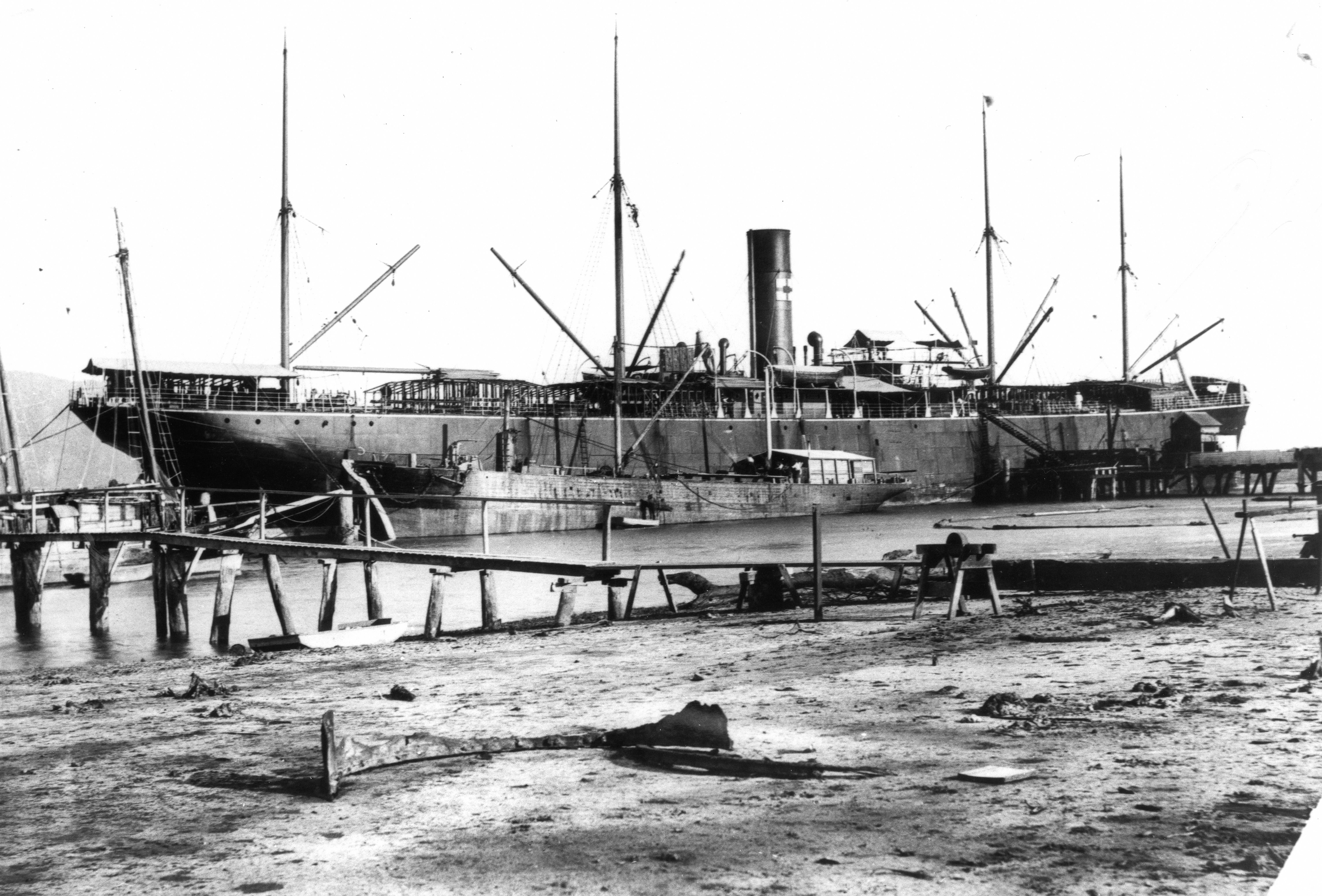
- Suffolk at Chillagoe Railway wharf, Cairns, March 1900

History

United Kingdom
- Name: Suffolk
- Namesake: Suffolk
- Owner: Birt, Trinder & Bethell
- Operator: Federal Steam Navigation Co
- Port of registry: London
- Builder: Sunderland Shipbuilding Co, Sunderland
- Yard number: 201
- Launched: 25 July 1899
- Completed: 1 November 1899
- Identification: UK official number 112617; code letters RKFQ
- Fate: Sank 24 September 1900

General characteristics
- Type: refrigerated cargo ship
- Tonnage: 5,364 GRT, 3,442 NRT, 8,750 DWT
- Length: 420.7 ft (128.2 m)
- Beam: 54.1 ft (16.5 m)
- Draught: 25 ft 10 1/2 in (7.887 m)
- Depth: 29.1 ft (8.9 m)
- Decks: 2
- Installed power: 505 NHP
- Propulsion: 1 × triple-expansion engine; 1 × screw
- Speed: 11 knots (20 km/h)
- Capacity: 266,000 cubic feet (7,532 m^{3}) refrigerated
- Crew: 63 crew + 66 hostlers

SS Suffolk was a refrigerated cargo steamship that was built in England in 1899 for the Federal Steam Navigation Company. In the Second Boer War she took horses from Australia to South Africa. She was wrecked in 1900 on a voyage from Austria-Hungary to South Africa, with the loss of 930 horses.

This was the first of three Federal Steam ships that were named after the English county of Suffolk. The second was a steamship that was built in 1902 and scrapped in 1927. The third was a motor ship that was built in 1939 and scrapped in 1968.

== Eight sister ships ==
In 1896 R. & W. Hawthorn, Leslie and Company at Hebburn on the River Tyne launched Cornwall and Devon, a pair of sister ships for Federal Steam, each with 229,960 cubic feet (6,512 m^{3}) of refrigerated cargo space. They were followed by several sister ships that were built to the same dimensions, but had four masts instead of two. Hawthorn, Leslie launched Kent and Surrey in 1899, and Sussex in 1900. Another ship that Hawthorn, Leslie laid down for Federal Steam to the same design was bought on the stocks by Shaw, Savill & Albion Line and launched in 1899 as Karamea.

The Sunderland Shipbuilding Company at South Dock, Sunderland, County Durham also built two ships to the same design. Yard number 201 was launched on 25 July 1899 as Suffolk, completed on 1 November, and completed her sea trials on 20 November. Yard number 202 was launched on 18 December 1899 as Norfolk, and completed on 29 March 1900.

== Description and registration ==
Suffolk had a steel hull, built on the deep frame principle, with cellular water ballast tanks fore and aft. Her registered length was 420.7 ft (128.2 m), her beam was 54.1 ft (16.5 m), and her depth was 29.1 ft (8.9 m). Her tonnages were 5,364 GRT, 3,442 NRT, and about 8,750 DWT.

J & E Hall supplied her refrigerating equipment, which used compressed "cabonic anhydride" (i.e. carbon dioxide). Parts of her number 2, number 3, and number 4 holds were refrigerated. They were insulated with "silicate of cotton" (i.e. mineral wool), with brine as the coolant. Her refrigerated capacity was about 266,000 cubic feet (7,532 m^{3}), which was enough for 130,000 carcasses of mutton. When she was new, it was claimed that Suffolk was "the largest refrigerated vessel afloat". She had a shelter deck to carry livestock, and for cargo handling she had ten steam winches and numerous derricks. She also had first- and second-class berths for passengers.

Suffolk had a single screw, driven by a three-cylinder triple-expansion engine built by the North Eastern Marine Engineering Company in Wallsend, Northumberland. It was rated at 505 NHP.

Federal Steam registered Suffolk in London. Her United Kingdom official number was 112617 and her code letters were RKFQ.

== Maiden voyage ==
On 20 November 1899 Suffolk sailed from Sunderland to London. She loaded a mixed cargo including frozen pheasant and deer; telecommunications cable; steel plate; and 3,200 tons of steel rails. On 21 December she left London on her maiden voyage, and on 9 January she left the Thames. Her Master was Captain John Cuthbert, RNR.

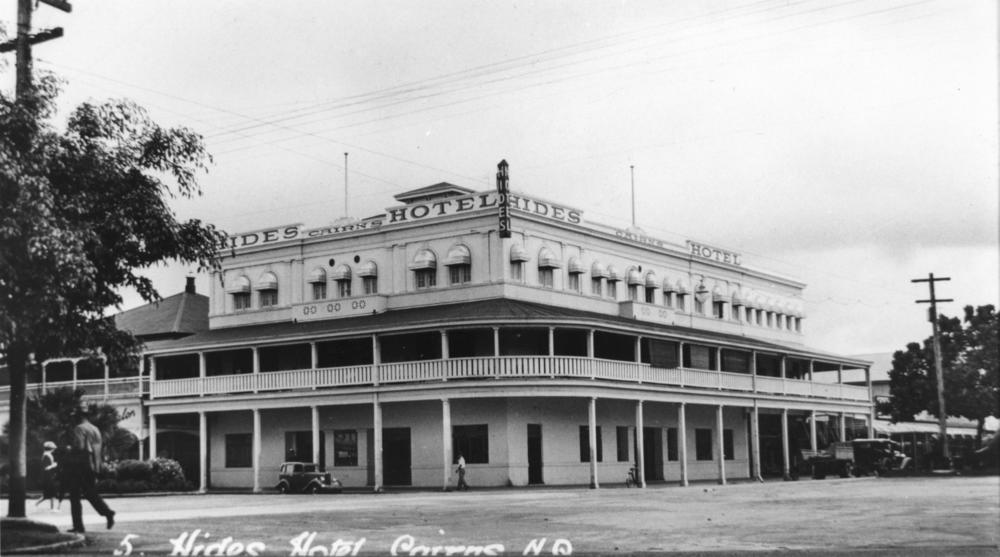
Hides Hotel, Cairns

On 6 February 1900 she reached Fremantle in Western Australia, having averaged 11 knots (20 km/h) on the voyage. There she discharged the steel plate, which was for a water project at Coolgardie; the cable, which was to be laid under the sea between Cottesloe Beach and Rottnest Island; and a large general cargo. On 24 March she reached Sydney in New South Wales, where she embarked a team of carpenters who were to install fittings on her two upper cargo decks to accommodate 800 horses as she steamed to Queensland and back. On 26 February she left Sydney, and on 4 March she reached Cairns in Queensland. There it took until 21 March to complete discharging her steel rails, which were for the Chillagoe Railway and Mining Co. Once the unloading was complete, the acting Mayor of Cairns gave a dinner at Hides Hotel for Captain Cuthbert and his officers. Both her Master and her Chief Engineer praised Cairns as the only port they had visited since Sydney that had a wharf in water deep enough for Suffolk to moor alongside.

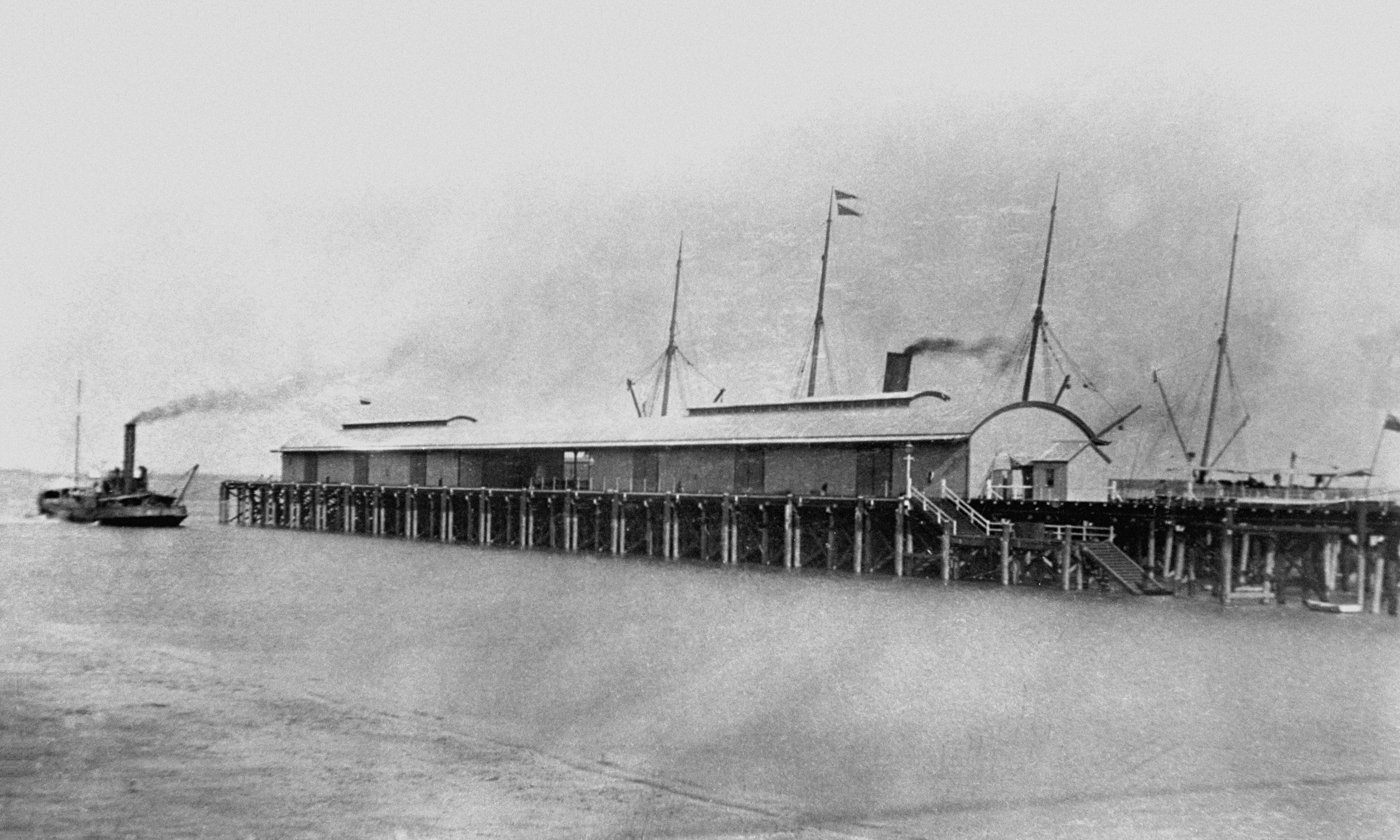
Broadmount wharf in 1900

Suffolk continued to Gladstone, where she loaded 650 tons of frozen meat and 200 tons of "station produce". On 31 March she reached Broadmount, where she was the first ship to load frozen meat from refrigerator cars brought by rail from Lakes Creek, instead of it being brought downriver by tenders. A special passenger train ran from Archer Creek railway station to Broadmount to take interested businesspeople to watch the new operation. She loaded 235 tons of frozen meat, and then continued to Brisbane, where she reached Musgrave Wharf on 4 April to load another 750 tons of frozen beef, a quantity of "case meats" (i.e. canned meat), and more than 300 bales of wool. The meat was for South Africa, and the wool and station produce were for London. On 10 April she left Brisbane. The next day she reached Sydney for bunkering, and to load frozen mutton and more wool. On 18 April she reached Newcastle, where she loaded 763 horses for South Africa in less than five and a half hours, and left the next day to return to Sydney. On 21 April she left Sydney for London via Albany, Western Australia and Cape Town. Before she reached Albany two horse died, and her veterinary officer suffered a broken leg while trying to help another horse. Captain Cuthbert set toe bone as best he could, and McIvor disembarked to be hospitalised when Suffolk called at Albany on 1 May. On 28 May she reached a port in South Africa, presumably Cape Town, where she disembarked her horses. She left Cape Town on 25 June and reached London on 27 July.

== Second voyage and loss ==
For her second voyage Suffolk left London on 10 August 1900. On 22 August she reached Fiume in Austria-Hungary (now Rijeka in Croatia) to embark 1,000 horses for the 10th Hussars in South Africa, but was able to take only 930. She left Fiume on August 24, bunkered at Tenerife on 3 September; called at Cape Town on 22 September; and continued the same day for Port Elizabeth. As well as her 63 crew she carried 66 hostlers looking after the horses, and a veterinary surgeon.

At 04:40 hrs on 23 September she passed about 11 nautical miles (20 km) off Cape Agulhas. Cuthbert changed course then, and again at 10:40 hrs to a more easterly one. The weather was clear, and the sea calm. Suffolk continued on this course until 03:20 hrs on 24 September, when the Second Officer, Charles Stokes, who was on watch, heard breakers and put the helm hard-a-port. It was too late, and Suffolk struck rocks off Tzitzikamma Point, near Cape St. Francis, at position 34°12′00″S 24°30′30″E. Her number 3 hold struck a rock; and her numbers 4 and 5 holds and her stokehold were also damaged. Her stokehold and engine room were flooded, and her fires were extinguished.

The Elder, Dempster steamship Lake Erie was passing, 4 to 5 nautical miles (7 to 9 km) farther out to sea, and came to investigate. Lake Erie was larger than Suffolk, but unsuited to towing her off the rocks. A smaller steamship, Inchanga, also arrived, but was also unable to tow her.

After consultation, Captain Cuthbert, his officers and men, and the hostlers, abandoned Suffolk at 12:30 hrs and transferred to Lake Erie. The horses were released to give them a chance to swim ashore, but none succeeded. Suffolk sank at 15:50 hrs. Lake Erie landed the survivors at Port Elizabeth later that day.

== Court of inquiry ==
A Court of Inquiry was held in Port Elizabeth from 3 to 9 October. It found, inter alia, that Suffolk lacked a large-scale Admiralty chart of the coast from Mossel Bay to Cape St Francis; or a copy of African Pilot, Part III; which was the pilot book for that part of the coast. It found that Cuthbert had set Suffolk's course incorrectly on 23 September, failing to allow for currents in the area. It found that on the night of 23–24 September no attempt was made to verify her position, and no soundings were taken to check the depth beneath her. It found that Second Officer Stokes was inexplicably absent from the bridge in the minutes before she grounded; and that Captain Cuthbert should have been supervising her navigation along so hazardous a section of coast.

The court found Cuthbert, Stokes, and the lookout who was on watch, all to be negligent. It suspended Cuthbert's Master's certificate for six months. Stokes also had a Master's certificate, and the court cancelled it. The court "severely censured" the lookout, who was an able seaman.

== Bibliography ==
- Board of Trade (1900). (No. 6119.) "Suffolk" (S.S.) (PDF). London: Her Majesty's Stationery Office – via Southampton City Council.
- Haws, Duncan (1985). New Zealand Shipping Co. & Federal S.N. Co. Merchant Fleets. Vol. 7. Burwash: Travel Creatours Ltd Publications. ISBN 0-946378-02-9.
- "Launches and Trial Trips". The Marine Engineer & Naval Architect. Vol. XXI. September 1899. p. 281.
- "Launches and Trial Trips". The Marine Engineer & Naval Architect. Vol. XXI. December 1899. p. 410.
- Lloyd's Register of British & Foreign Shipping. Vol. I.–Steamers. London: Lloyd's Register of Shipping. 1900 – via Internet Archive.
- Mercantile Navy List. London. 1900 – via Crew List Index Project.
- Minutes of Evidence Taken Before the Court of Enquiry on the Administration of the Army Remount Department. Westminster: Eyre and Spottiswood. 1902. pp. 301–347.
