= MS Ruahine =

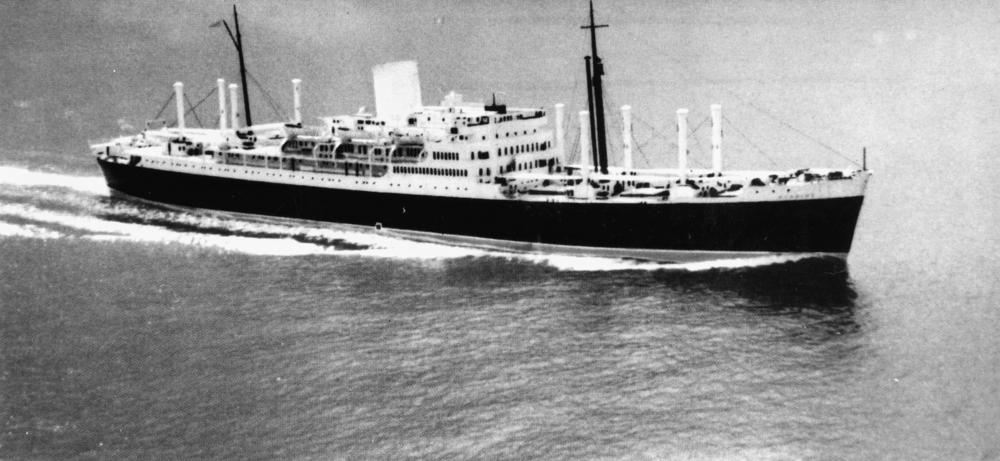
- MS Ruahine

History

United Kingdom
- Owner: New Zealand Shipping Company (1951–1966) Federal Line (1966–1967)
- Builder: John Brown & Company
- Launched: 11 December 1950
- Completed: 3 May 1951
- In service: 1951
- Out of service: 1967
- Fate: Sold

History

Hong Kong
- Name: Oriental Rio
- Owner: Orient Overseas Line
- Acquired: 1968
- Fate: Scrapped 1974

General characteristics
- Tonnage: 17,851 gross register tons
- Length: 584 ft (178 m)
- Beam: 75 ft (23 m)
- Propulsion: Diesel
- Capacity: 267 passengers

MS Ruahine was a passenger ship that operated in the mid-20th century, primarily for the New Zealand Shipping Company.

Built by John Brown & Company for the New Zealand Shipping Company, she was launched on 11 December 1950 and entered service in May 1951. She operated in combined passenger and cargo trade from London to Auckland and Wellington, arriving in New Zealand in November 1951. At the end of 1966, she was transferred to the fleet of New Zealand Shipping subsidiary Federal Line, but operated under the British flag for only one more year, making her final New Zealand voyage in late 1967. She was subsequently sold to the Orient Overseas Line and renamed Oriental Rio, sailing under the Hong Kong flag until she was scrapped in 1974.

Ruahine measured 17,851 gross register tons, and was 584 feet (178 m) long, with a beam of 75 feet (23 m). She was powered by Doxford diesel engines driving two screws, which gave her a service speed of 16.5 knots (19.0 mph). She had a passenger capacity of 267 in a single-class configuration.

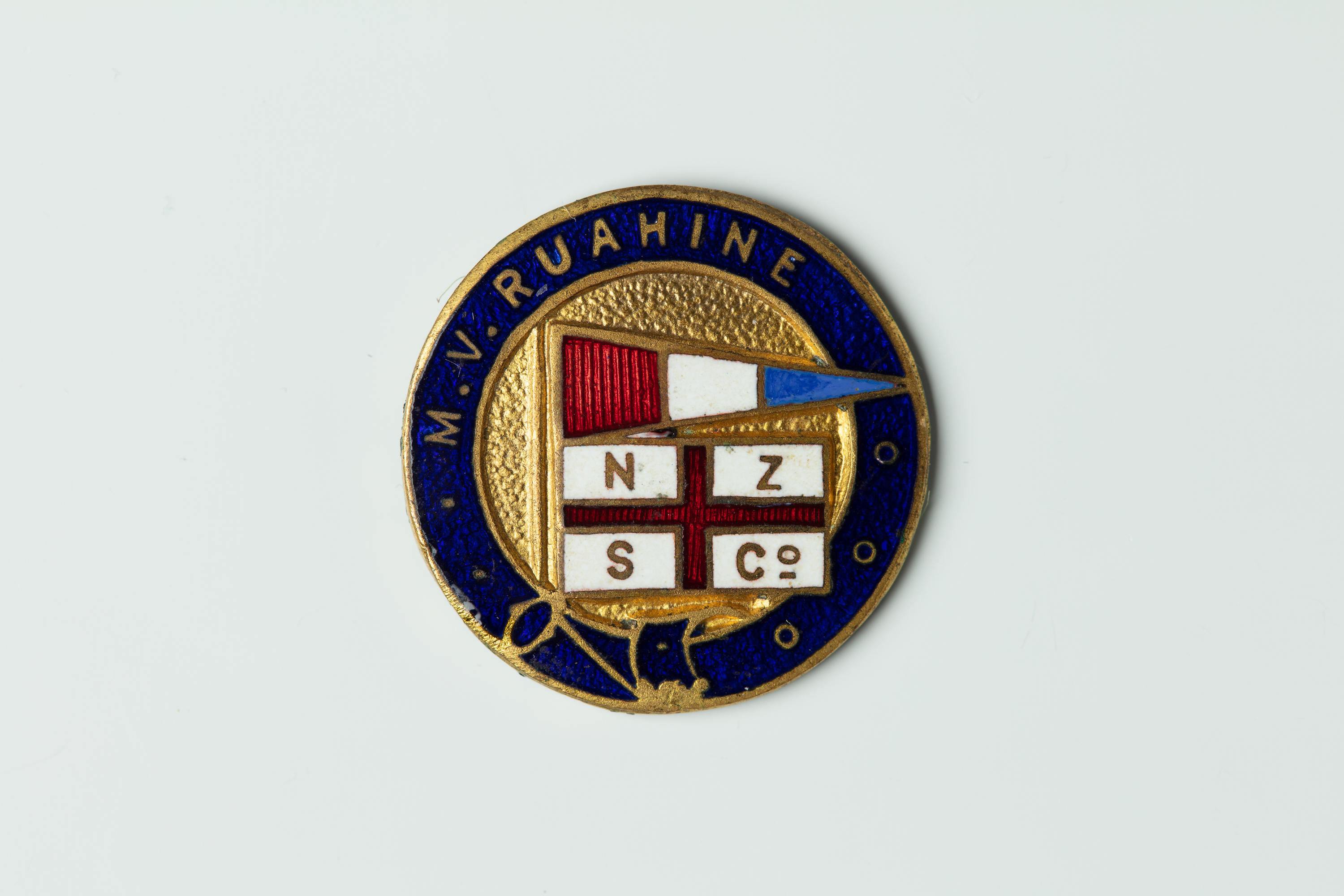
MV Ruahine Badge New Zealand Shipping Company
