= Otaki =

Otaki or Ōtaki may refer to:

== Places ==
- Ōtaki, New Zealand
  - Ōtaki (New Zealand electorate)
- Ōtaki River, New Zealand
- Ōtaki, Chiba, Japan
- Ōtaki, Saitama, Japan
- Ōtaki, Hokkaido, Japan
- Ōtaki, Nagano, Japan
- Otaki, California, U.S.

== Surname ==
- Ami Otaki (大滝 麻未; born 1989), Japanese football player
- Chika Otaki (大滝 知香; born 1998), Japanese hockey player
- Eiichi Ohtaki (大瀧 榮一; 1948–2013), Japanese rock musician
- Eiju Otaki (大滝 英二; born 1932), Japanese photojournalist
- Hideji Ōtaki (大滝 秀治; 1925–2012), Japanese actor
- Shinya Ōtaki (大滝 進矢; born 1953), Japanese voice actor
- Takuya Otaki (大滝 拓也; born 1995), Japanese racing driver
- Wakana Ootaki (大滝 若奈; born 1984), Japanese pop singer
- Yuria Ōtaki (大滝 友梨亜; born 1995), Japanese former member of the NGT48

== Other uses ==
- List of ships named Otaki
- "Otaki", a 1970 single by The Fourmyula
