= Waikato (disambiguation) =

Waikato is a top-tier local government region of New Zealand extending from Thames-Coromandel District to Taupo District.

Waikato may also refer to:

- Waikato District, a second-tier local government region of New Zealand (part of Waikato Region)
- Waikato, area subjected to the 1860s Invasion of the Waikato
- Waikato River, longest river in New Zealand
- Waikato (iwi), a Māori tribe
- Waikato (rangatira) (c. 1790 – 1877), Māori tribal leader
- Waikato (New Zealand electorate), a general electorate
- Hauraki-Waikato, a Māori electorate
- Port Waikato, a small town
- HMNZS Waikato (F55), a frigate
- SS Waikato, a steamship

Organisations

- Waikato Rugby Union, a governing body for rugby union
- Waikato Rugby League, a governing body for rugby league
- Waikato FC, a football (soccer) club
- Diocese of Waikato
- University of Waikato
