= Cairns Masonic Temple =

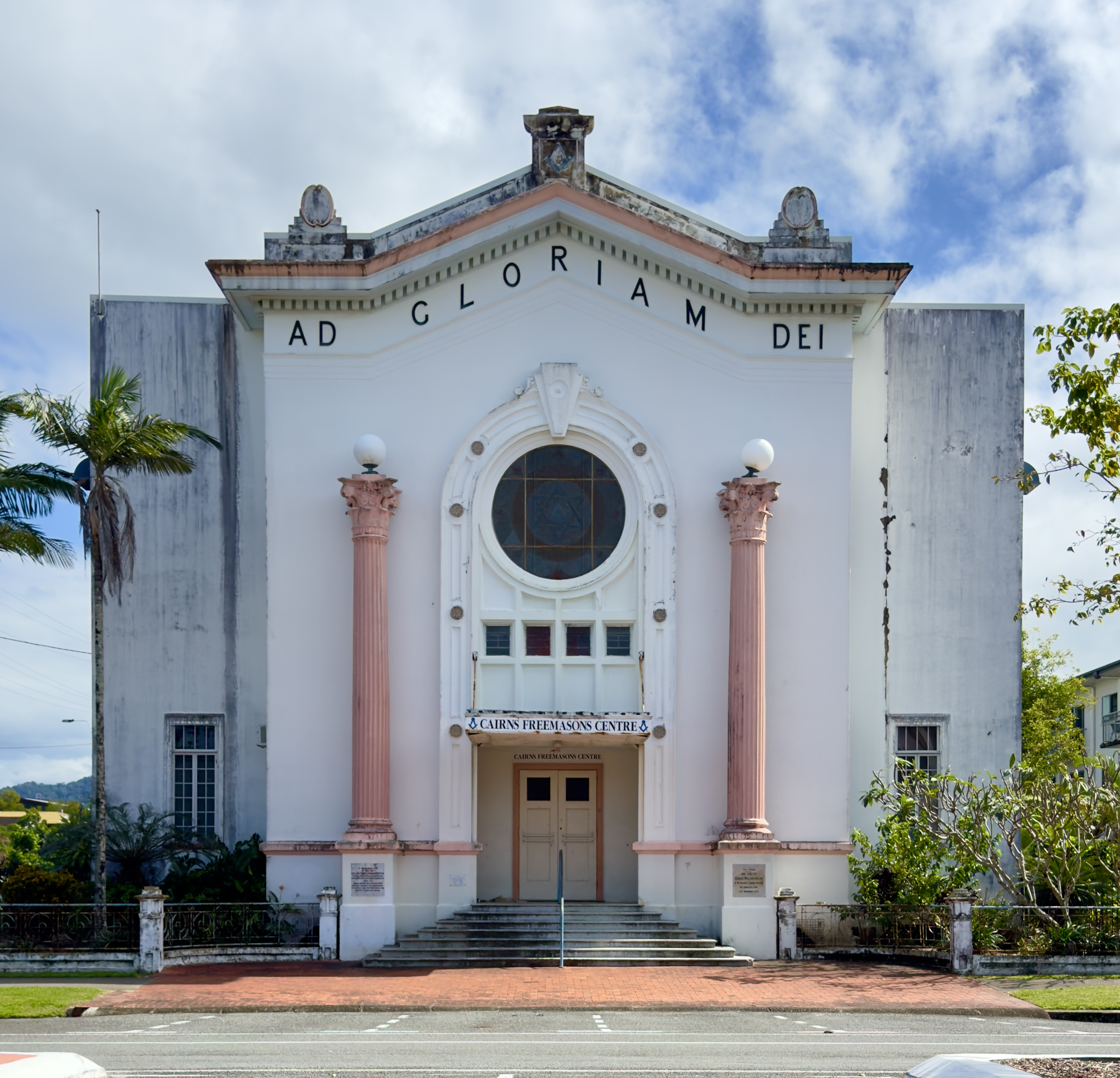
- Cairns Masonic Temple, 2025

- Location within Queensland Location within Australia
- 16.9174°S 145.7704°E
- Location: 8 Minnie Street, Cairns City, Cairns, Cairns Region, Queensland, Australia

History
- Design period: 1919–1930s (interwar period)
- Built: 1934–1935

Queensland Heritage Register
- Official name: Cairns Masonic Temple
- Type: state heritage (built)
- Designated: 28 August 1998
- Reference no.: 601539
- Significant period: 1934–1935, 1957 (fabric); 1935–ongoing (social)
- Significant components: furniture/fittings, fence/wall – perimeter

Cairns Masonic Temple is a heritage-listed former masonic temple at 8 Minnie Street, Cairns City, Cairns, Cairns Region, Queensland, Australia. It was built from 1934 to 1935. It was added to the Queensland Heritage Register on 28 August 1998.

Masonic duties ceased here after its sale to the Catholic Church in 2017.

== History ==
Completed in 1935, this two-storeyed concrete structure was the third building to be used as a Masonic Temple in Cairns.

The first recorded gathering of Freemasons in Cairns was held in December 1885, at Hides Hotel. The first Masonic Lodge in Cairns, Gregory Lodge No. 50 was constituted in April 1886. By the mid 1920s, there were six Lodges that met in Cairns, in a building in Lake Street. Prior to the destruction of this building by a cyclone in 1927, the Lodges moved to a building adjoining the site of the present Temple.

In 1921, at a meeting held in the Cairns Masonic Hall, it was resolved that the representatives of the Gregory Lodge would communicate with the Grand Lodge regarding the establishment of a District Grand Lodge (DGL) of Carpentaria, with headquarters at Cairns. The creation of the DGL of Carpentaria was approved by the Grand Lodge in December 1923, and was subsequently formed in 1924; the Carpentaria district spread from Cardwell to Cape York, and west to Normanton.

In 1928, it was recommended that the DGL erect a suitable memorial to the craftsman who sacrificed so much in World War I, and to the peace which followed. The following year, the DGL organised an appeal for individual donations towards the erection of the Memorial Temple. In 1934 it was decided to proceed with the erection of a Memorial Temple adjoining the present Hall at a cost not exceeding £12 000.

Tenders for the new Masonic Temple were called in August 1934. The architects for the buildings were the north Queensland firm of Hill and Taylor, who had offices in Townsville and Cairns. Richard Hill and Arthur Taylor established the firm of Hill and Taylor in Cairns in 1927, and in 1931, the firm took over the practice of CV Rees in Townsville. Both Hill and Taylor appear to have been masons.

The contractor for the building was CE Steadman, also a mason. The foundation stone of the building was laid on Armistice Day in 1934. Reports from the laying of the stone refer to the building as the Masonic Peace Memorial Temple, and the following description was given of the building:

it would [upon its completion] be a worthy and fitting monument of the union of Freemasonry and a fitting memorial and tribute to those who sacrificed so much in the Great War. When it was decided to have the foundation stone laid on Armistice Day, he believed that no more fitting day could have been chosen as it was a day symbolising peace and harmony which was an attribute of the Craft

The Temple was constructed during the large-scale interwar redevelopment of Cairns, in which the city centre was virtually rebuilt. The redevelopment was partly a consequence of severe cyclone damage suffered by the city in 1920 and 1927, and also of the developing role of Cairns as an important regional centre in Far North Queensland.

The dedication ceremony for the completed Temple was held in October 1935, and was performed by Sir Leslie Wilson, Governor of Queensland and Masonic Grand Master. The ceremony was a large occasion; attended by about 700 representatives of Lodges in Queensland.

A description of the building shortly before the dedication, referred to the imposing facade facing Minnie Street, and the North Queensland walnut and maple joinery. The attention given to the ventilation of the building was also important, and ducts from the external wall were brought through under a raised platform around the lodge room and the air exhausted by two big fans ensuring a continuous flow of fresh, cool air on even the most humid evenings.

A tablet to the memory of WHJ Mayers, the Foundation District Grand Master, was set into the base of the pillar at the left entrance to the temple and unveiled in March 1954.

The two large pillars at the entrance to the temple were destroyed/damaged by a cyclone in March 1956. There was considerable damage also to the windows and outbuildings of the temple. New columns are recorded as being completed in 1957, and in accordance with Masonic tradition, were formed hollow and a copy of all records subsequent to the laying of the foundation stone was placed inside one of the pillars.

== Description ==
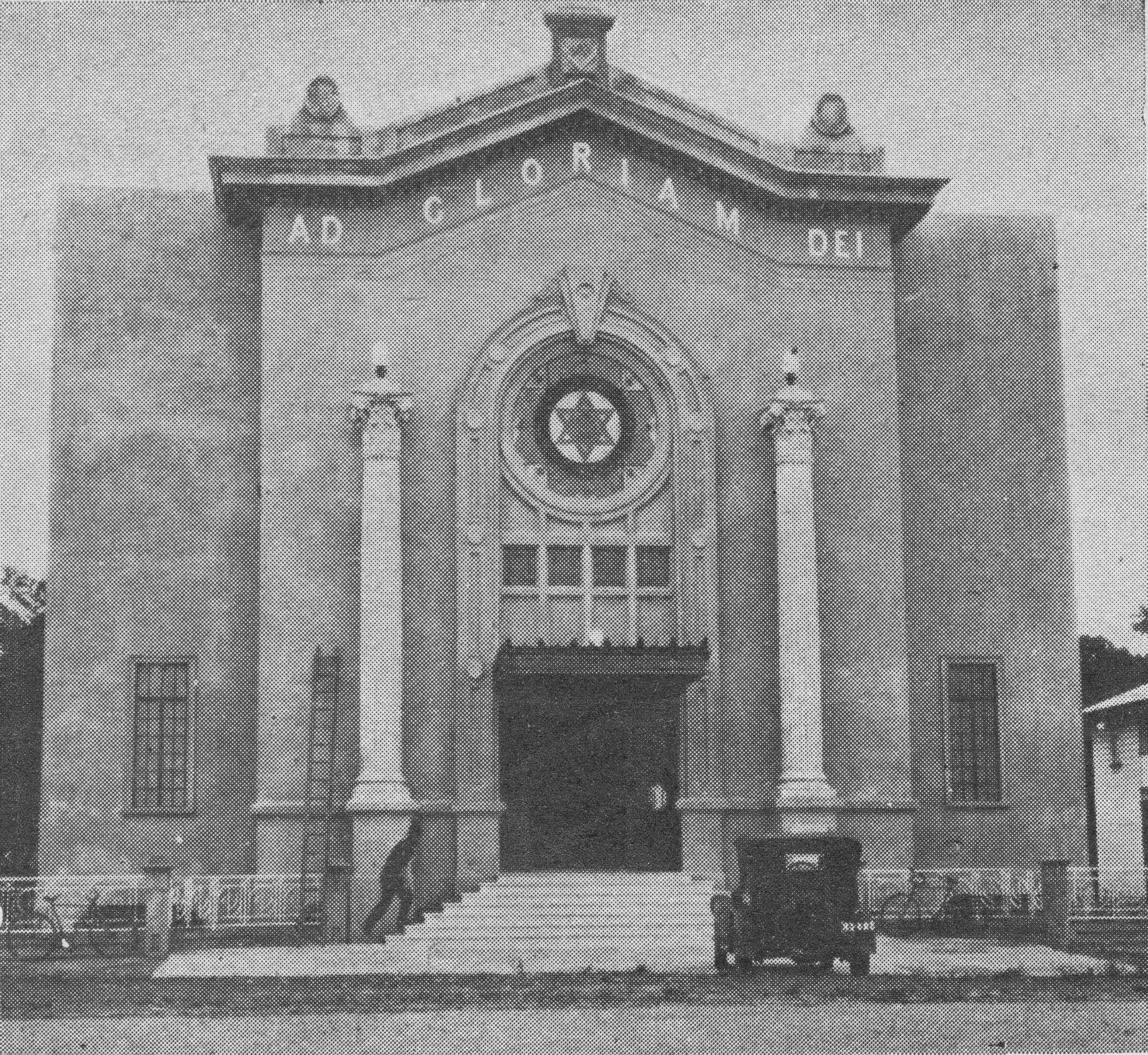
Cairns Masonic Temple, 1935

The Masonic temple, a two-storeyed concrete structure with a gable roof concealed behind a parapet wall, is located on the northern corner of Grafton Street with the main entry to Minnie Street to the southeast. The building is T-shaped in plan, with the main body of the building consisting of a minimally adorned box with high set steel framed windows. The gable entrance sits proud of the main section, and features a symmetrical facade composed of classical elements.

The entry consists of a flight of stairs to a recessed door with a cantilevered awning. The doorway is surmounted by a tall rendered arch flanked by a Corinthian column, supporting a large globe, to either side. Each column sits on a pedestal with a marble plaque. The rendered arch mouldings contain a large keystone and surround a circular window above a row of four small square windows. The parapet has a deep cornice above the words AD GLORIAM DEI, and is crowned with the masonic emblem of the carpenter's square and divider.

The building has high-level steel framed, multi-paned windows to each side and rear. Entrance doors area also located on either side and at the rear.

Internally, the building appears to consist of a large hall with a gallery, with staircases to the first floor at the front and rear.

The Minnie Street facade has an iron fence with concrete posts.

== Heritage listing ==
Cairns Masonic Temple was listed on the Queensland Heritage Register on 28 August 1998 having satisfied the following criteria.

The place is important in demonstrating the evolution or pattern of Queensland's history.

The Masonic Temple was completed in 1935, since which time it has served as the headquarters for Freemasonry in far north Queensland. The Temple survives as an illustration of the development of Cairns as an important regional centre during the early twentieth century.

The place is important because of its aesthetic significance.

The Masonic Temple has an imposing idiosyncratic facade which makes a strong contribution to the Cairns townscape. The building's facade, scale and form ensures its status as a Cairns landmark.
