= SS Aorangi =

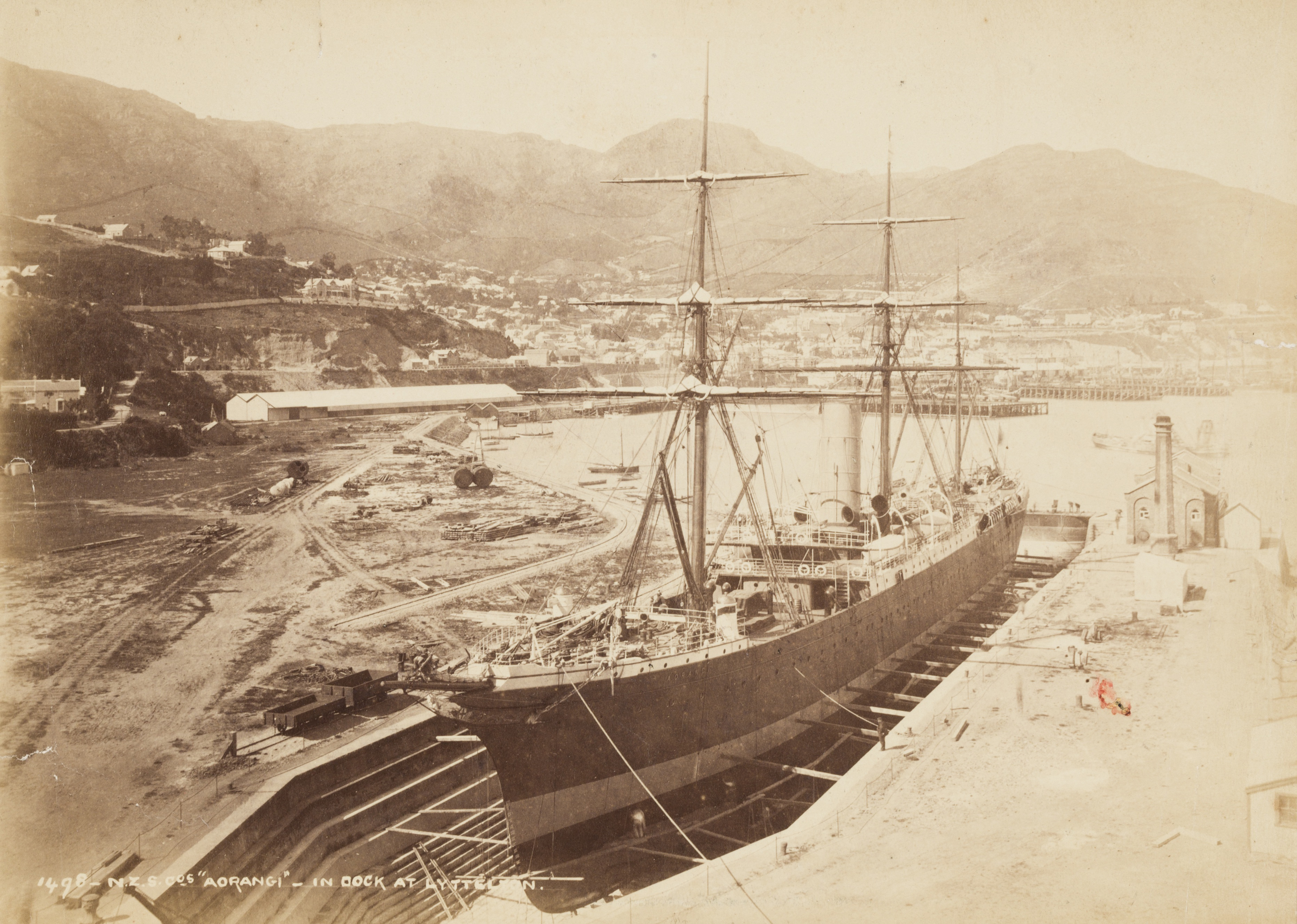
- "Aorangi" in dock at Lyttelton, New Zealand, c. 1894

History

New Zealand
- Name: Aorangi
- Namesake: Mount Cook (Maori: Aorangi)
- Owner: New Zealand Shipping Company; (1883–96); Canadian Australian Royal Mail Line (1896–97); New Zealand Line; (1897–1910); Union Steamship Co of New Zealand (1910–14)
- Builder: John Elder & Co., Govan
- Yard number: 281
- Launched: 2 October 1883
- In service: 1883–1915
- Honours and awards: Battle honours: (RAN); Rabaul 1914
- Fate: Scrapped in 1925

General characteristics
- Tonnage: 4,163 GRT
- Length: 389 ft (119 m)
- Beam: 46 ft (14 m)
- Capacity: passengers, 1883: 80 1st class, 80 2nd class, 250 3rd class; passengers, 1897: 100 1st class, 50 2nd class
- Armament: 1 × QF 12 pounder 12 cwt naval gun

SS Aorangi was a passenger and refrigerated cargo ship built by John Elder & Co. of Govan, Glasgow for the New Zealand Shipping Company and launched in 1883. She was chartered by the Royal Australian Navy (RAN) between April 1914 until 1915. In 1915, she was sunk as a blockship at Scapa Flow. In 1920, she was raised but re-sank in Kirk Bay.

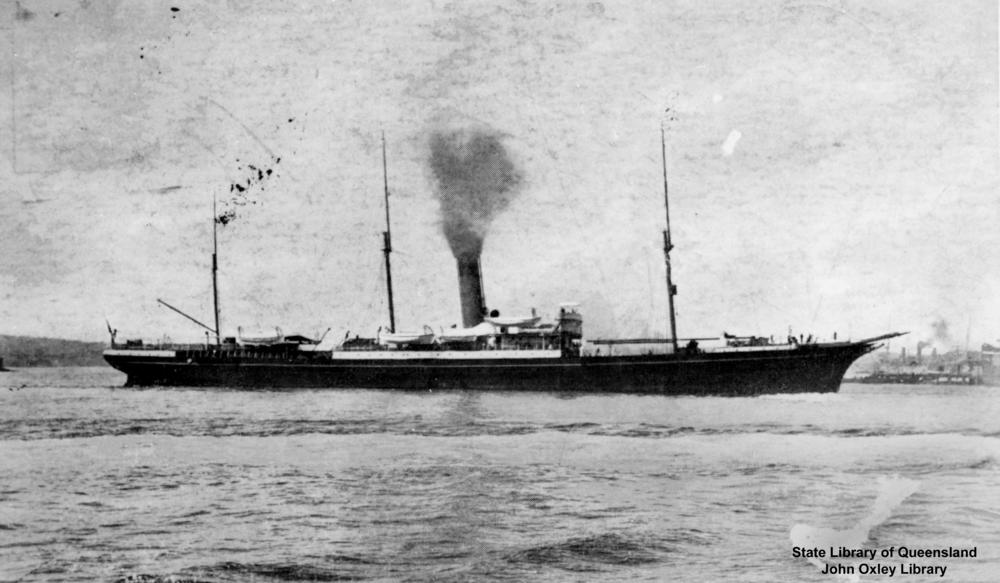
StateLibQld 1 65727 Aorangi (ship)

== Career ==
John Elder & Co of Govan built Aorangi as a passenger and refrigerated cargo ship for the New Zealand Shipping Company. Launched in 1883, she saw service on the passenger route between England and New Zealand, with accommodations for 80 first-class, 80 second-class, and 250 third-class passengers. She was then chartered in 1894 to Huddart Parker, underwent a major refit from 1896 to 1897, that made her funnel 10 feet (3.0 m) taller and changed her accommodations to 100 first-class and 50 second-class berths.

The ship saw service after her 1897 refit on the route between Australia, New Zealand and San Francisco, which included cargo and passenger service between Honolulu and Vancouver. Aorangi in this time carried some of the 1878 to 1911 wave of Portuguese immigration to Hawaii, when she arrived on 16 February 1901 in Honolulu Harbor from Vancouver with a contingent of 23 Portuguese immigrants, who had been recruited from the Eastern United States to work as contract laborers on the Hawaiian sugarcane plantations. The Aorangi continued to provide service between Australia and the United States until 1914 when she was laid up at Sydney.

In April 1914 the Royal Australian Navy (RAN) chartered Aorangi and used her as a supply ship. However, she was not commissioned into the RAN, but was manned by her civilian crew. She was armed with a QF 12 pounder 12 cwt naval gun, and took part in operations against the German colonies in the Pacific with the Australian Naval and Military Expeditionary Force and Australian Fleet. She was returned in May 1915 to her owners and subsequently sold to the Admiralty.

== Fate ==
She was scuttled on 10 August 1915 in Holm Sound, Scapa Flow as a blockship. In 1920 she was salvaged/refloated. She broke loose from her tow and sank in Kirk Bay.
