= SS Mongolia (1922) =

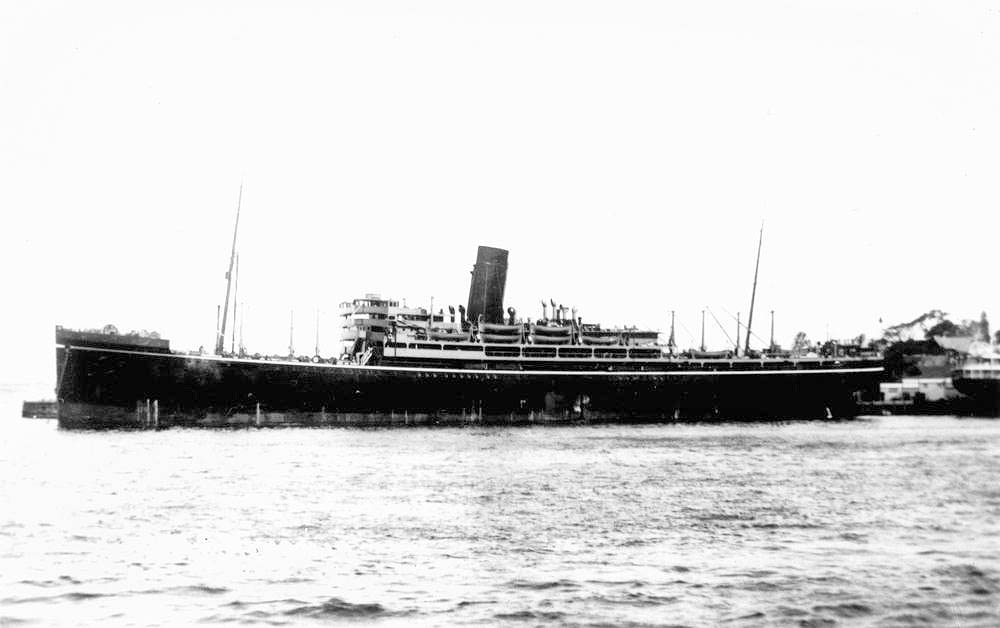
- Mongolia off Australia.

History

United Kingdom
- Name: Mongolia
- Owner: P&O
- Port of registry: Newcastle upon Tyne
- Route: UK—Australia, later UK—New Zealand
- Ordered: 22 November 1918
- Builder: Armstrong Whitworth, Newcastle upon Tyne
- Cost: £1 million
- Yard number: 964
- Launched: 24 August 1922
- Completed: 26 April 1923
- Maiden voyage: 11 May 1923
- Out of service: 1937
- Identification: Official number: 145517
- Fate: Sold, 1938

New Zealand
- Name: Rimutaka
- Operator: New Zealand Shipping Company
- Port of registry: Plymouth
- Out of service: 1950
- Fate: Sold, 1950

Panama
- Name: Europa
- Owner: Incres Steamship Company
- Port of registry: Panama
- Out of service: September, 1951
- Fate: Sold, 1951

--> Panama --> Liberia
- Name: Nassau
- Port of registry: Panama, later Liberia
- Out of service: 1961
- Fate: Sold, 1961

Mexico
- Name: Acapulco
- Owner: Natumex
- Port of registry: Acapulco, Mexico
- Acquired: 1961
- Out of service: 1963
- Fate: Scrapped 1964

General characteristics
- Tonnage: 16,504 GRT; 10,383 Net Register Tonnage
- Length: 573 ft (175 m) overall, 551 ft 6 in (168.10 m) between perpendiculars
- Beam: 72 ft (22 m)
- Draught: 30 ft (9.1 m)
- Depth: 38 ft 6 in (11.73 m)
- Installed power: 6 double-reduction-geared steam turbines
- Propulsion: Twin screws
- Speed: 16 knots (30 km/h)
- Capacity: 231 first class, 180 second class passengers; 669,000 cu ft (18,900 m^{3}) cargo including 136,000 cu ft (3,900 m^{3}) refrigerated

SS Mongolia was a steam turbine-driven twin-screw passenger-and-cargo ocean liner launched in 1922 for the Peninsular and Oriental Steam Navigation Company (P&O) for service from the United Kingdom to Australia. Later in P&O service she sailed for New Zealand, and in 1938 she was chartered to a P&O subsidiary, the New Zealand Shipping Company, as SS Rimutaka.

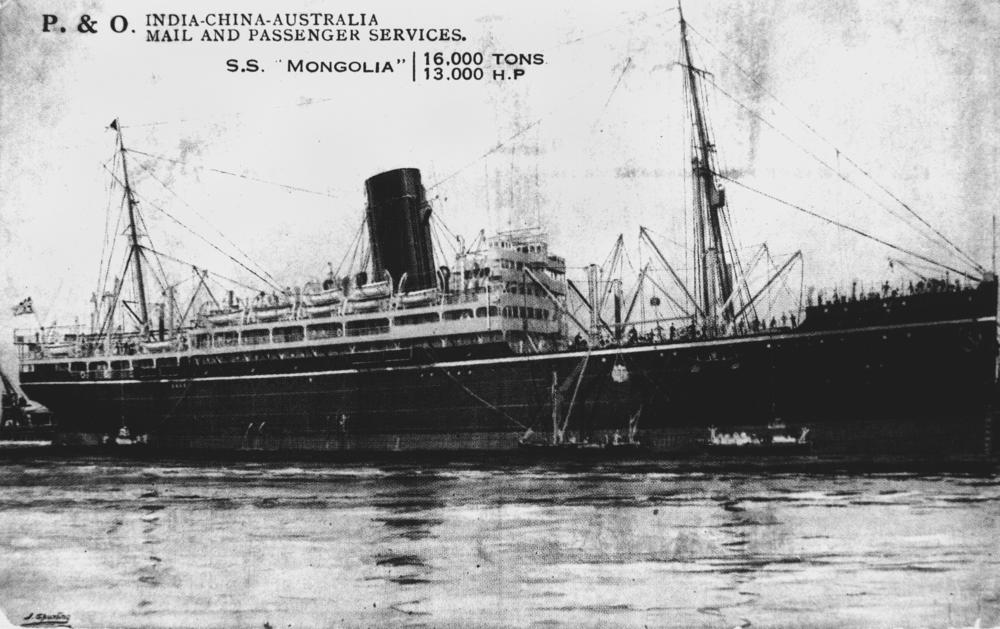
Mongolia

In 1950 she was sold to become the SS Europa, carrying immigrants to the United States from Europe; later, she became a Bahamas cruise ship, the SS Nassau. Its final incarnation was under a Mexican flag as a Los Angeles to Acapulco cruise liner, SS Acapulco, making her the only ocean liner to ever fly the Mexican flag. The ship was scrapped in 1964.

== Mongolia, 1922–1938 ==
The P&O ordered Mongolia from Sir W G Armstrong, Whitworth & Co. Ltd. of Newcastle upon Tyne on 22 November 1918, but construction was delayed by postwar refits of existing ships and she was not launched until 24 August 1922. After fitting out and sea trials the Mongolia was delivered to P&O on 26 April 1923. The ship cost an estimated £1 million.

She left London on her maiden voyage to Sydney on 11 May 1923 on what was at first a 4-weekly mail service, that service being increased to fortnightly from 1925. She was converted to oil fuel in 1928.

Notable incidents included a collision on 16 July 1933 with the tanker British Venture and a breakwater in Copenhagen, followed by running aground; and a collision with Villa de Madrid off Marseille on 3 December 1936.

She was laid up for sale in 1937.

She was captained by Harry Ramsey Rhodes for 9 years.

== Rimutaka, 1938–1950 ==
In 1938, the P&O transferred the ship under long-term charter to their subsidiary, the New Zealand Shipping Company, who renamed her SS Rimutaka, the third ship of that name, registered at Plymouth. She was reconfigured at this time to carry 840 tourist class passengers; before entering service, she was in collision with Corfleet off the Nore. After repairs, she departed for New Zealand for the first time on 12 December 1938. The Rimutaka worked a route from London, through Panama, to Auckland, New Zealand and terminating at Wellington, New Zealand.

She suffered a fire in her No. 3 hold on 9 March 1939. In September of that year, she was requisitioned for conversion to an armed merchant cruiser due to the outbreak of World War II, but was released from that service before any conversion occurred. Instead, the Rimutaka was requisitioned for the Liner Division between 12 May 1940 and 14 June 1946, but remained in the UK—New Zealand service for most of the war.

After hostilities ceased, she continued in NZSC service on the same route; her last voyage with the company was in 1950, departing Wellington for London in January, 1950. She was returned to parent P&O for sale.

== Europa, 1950–1951 ==
On 3 March 1950 the ship was transferred from P&O to the Home Lines-affiliated Compania de Navegacion Incres SA (Incres Shipping Company) of Panama for £95,000. She was renamed SS Europa, converted to take 614 tourist class passengers, was stripped of her refrigerated cargo space, and placed into service transporting stateless immigrants from Europe to the United States and Canada. She was Italian-crewed, and first sailed from Genoa; later crossings began from Antwerp and later Le Havre. A stop en route was made at Plymouth to collect British immigrants. The destinations were Halifax, Nova Scotia and New York City. The Europa continued in this service until the end of September, 1951.

== Nassau, 1951–1961 ==
After this, the ship was renovated in Genoa to become the Incres Nassau Line's SS Nassau, a cruise ship sailing from New York City to Nassau in the Bahamas. Her cargo holds were removed and swimming pools and other amenities were fitted, suiting her to her new role. This was the first time a ship was employed year-round as a cruise ship. In 1954 her registry was transferred to Liberia.

== Acapulco, 1961–1963 ==
The ship was purchased in 1961 by Natumex Line (Compania Navegacion Turística Mexicana SA), a Mexican government-owned company, to provide a fortnightly service between Acapulco and Los Angeles. She underwent a rebuild by the Fairfield Shipbuilding & Engineering Co., Ltd. of Glasgow, Scotland including the fitting of a new bow and funnel. The SS Acapulco then sailed for the United States, where she initially failed inspections by the United States Coast Guard. On her third trip from California she suffered a mechanical breakdown at sea.

In 1962 she went to the Century 21 Exposition to serve as a hotel ship.

In 1963 she was laid up at Manzanillo, Colima, and in 1964 she was towed to Japan for scrap, arriving at Osaka on 15 December 1964 for breaking up at Sakai. Demolition began on 6 January 1965.
