= Hides Hotel =

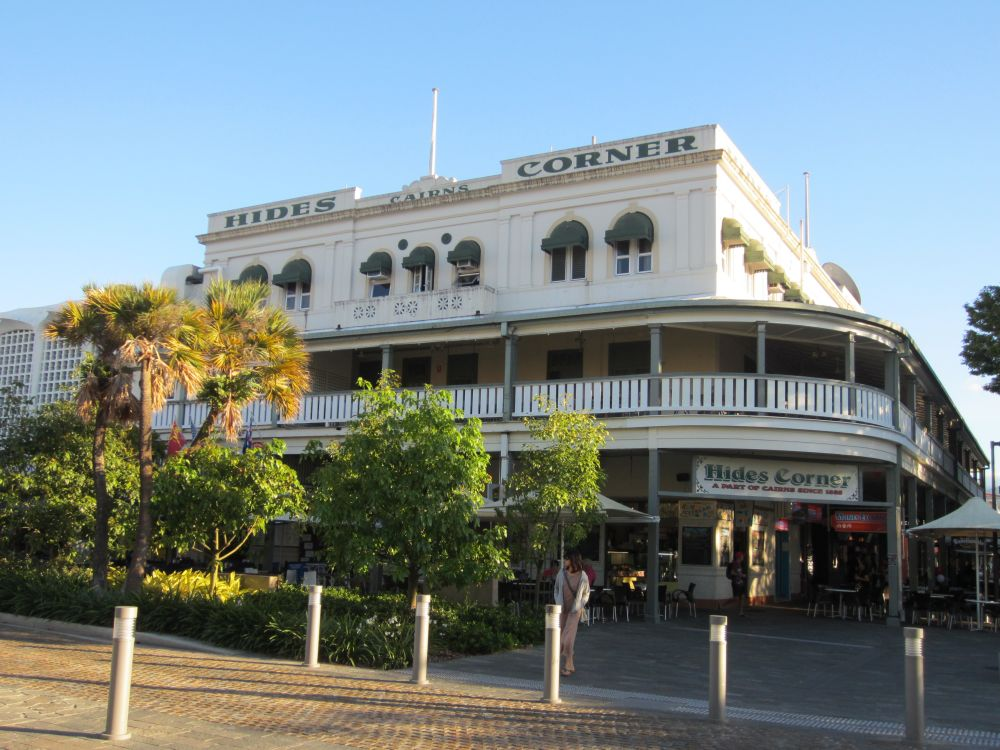
- Hides Hotel, 2015

- Location within Queensland Location within Australia
- 16.9226°S 145.7757°E
- Location: 87 Lake Street, Cairns City, Cairns, Cairns Region, Queensland, Australia

History
- Design period: 1919–1930s (interwar period)
- Built: 1928
- Built for: O'Hara family

Site notes
- Architect: Sydenham Stanley Oxenham

Queensland Heritage Register
- Official name: Hides Hotel, Hides Cairns Hotel
- Type: state heritage (built)
- Designated: 21 October 1992
- Reference no.: 600382
- Significant period: 1920s–1930s (fabric); 1928–ongoing (historical use)
- Significant components: flagpole/flagstaff, elevator
- Builders: Michael Thomas Garvey

Hides Hotel is a heritage-listed hotel at 87 Lake Street, Cairns City, Cairns, Cairns Region, Queensland, Australia. It was designed by Sydenham Stanley Oxenham and built in 1928 by Michael Thomas Garvey. It is also known as Hides Cairns Hotel. It was added to the Queensland Heritage Register on 21 October 1992.

== History ==
This three-storeyed, reinforced concrete hotel was constructed in two stages, 1928 and by c. 1936, for the O'Hara family, well known Cairns publicans. It was erected adjacent to an earlier Hides' Cairns Hotel, and for nearly four decades the two buildings functioned together as Hides' Hotel.

The earlier hotel, a substantial, 20 bedroom, two-storeyed timber building with double front verandahs and an observation tower, was erected in 1885 by Townsville contractors Hinton & Co., for publicans George Parker Hides and Duncan McColl, who also were in partnership in the Royal Hotel at Herberton. Their Cairns Hotel was located in Lake Street, adjacent to the site of the present Hides' Hotel, on land owned by Dr Edward Albert Koch, and let to Hides and McColl on a building lease. It was erected during the second wave of building activity in Cairns (the first being the 1876–77 establishment of the settlement), following Cairns's designation in 1885 as the destination of the Tablelands rail link to the interior goldfields, and its proclamation as a municipality (Borough of Cairns) in the same year. The hotel was renovated c. 1891, and by 1899 a substantial, two-storeyed timber wing had been constructed at the rear, and the accommodation had been extended to 32 bedrooms.

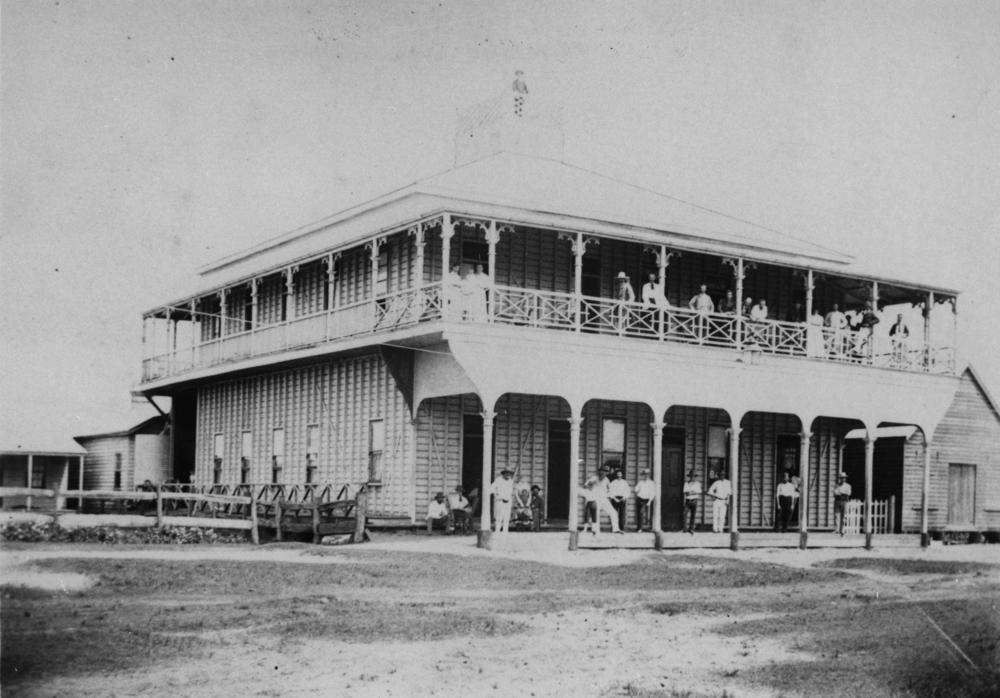
Cairns Hotel, 1886 (now demolished)

With the construction of the Cairns Hotel, Hides and McColl pioneered Lake Street as a commercial address. The hotel also played a significant role in the early commercial and social life of Cairns, catering for commercial travellers as well as local trade. Meetings to establish a Cairns School of Arts and a Masonic Lodge were held at the hotel in November 1885, and the Cairns Chamber of Commerce held its inaugural meeting there on 13 May 1886.

McColl held the first license for the Cairns Hotel, but this was transferred in mid-1888 to Hides. Following Hides' death in 1895, his widow, Elizabeth Moir Hides, retained the Cairns Hotel license for many years, and purchased the hotel site from Dr Koch in 1899. In 1900–01 she also acquired the adjoining allotment on the corner of Lake and Shields Streets, on which the present Hides' Hotel stands. A single-storeyed timber shop on this site was demolished and replaced by the hotel garden. In 1925, both sites were transferred to O'Hara Limited.

A third period of intensive building activity in Cairns took place in the 1920s, associated with the expansion of the town as the port servicing the new soldier settlements inland; the upgrading to City status in 1923; the establishment of Cairns in 1924 as the terminus of the North Coast railway from Brisbane; and the reconstruction following extensive cyclone damage to the Cairns central business district in the early and mid-1920s.

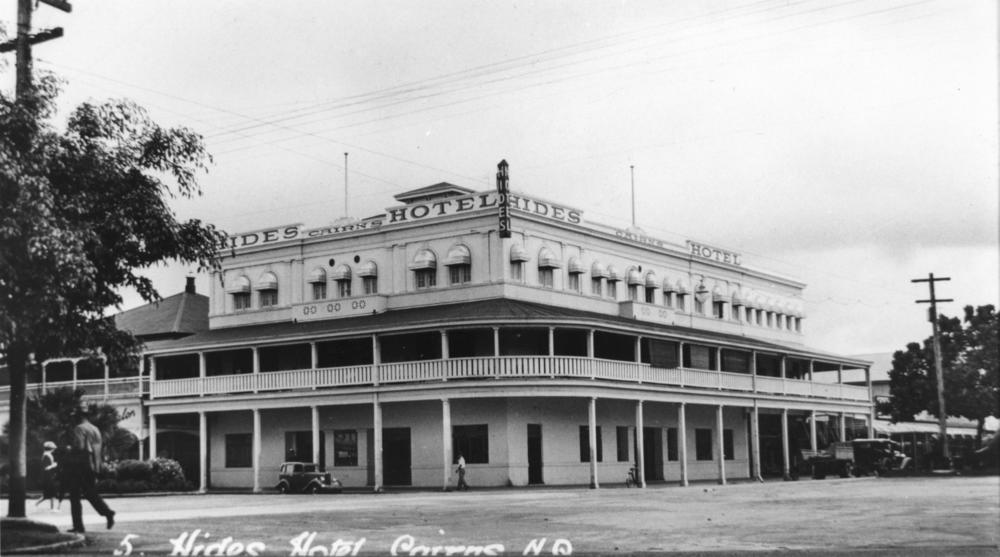
Hides Hotel, 1937

The foundation stone of the new Hides' Cairns Hotel was laid by Denis O'Hara Junior on 16 May 1928. The building, estimated to cost approximately £30,000, was designed by Cairns architect Sydenham Stanley Oxenham, and was erected by Toowoomba and Cairns contractor Michael Thomas Garvey. Local North Queensland timbers were used throughout. At the time of construction, it was one of the largest buildings in Cairns, and was one of only two three-storeyed structures in the city, the other being Boland's store at the corner of Lake and Spence Streets. The original scheme was for a frontage of 120 feet (37 m) to Shields Street, but the 1928 building extended only 87 feet (27 m) along Shields Street. By c. 1936, the original concept was completed, with the addition of two shops at ground level and two levels of bedrooms above, along Shields Street. In the 1930s, the new Hides' Cairns Hotel was pre-eminent amongst Cairns hotels, catering largely to visitors and Cairns "society".

The O'Hara family retained the property until 1946, when it was transferred to Burns Philp & Company Ltd, who held the title until 1976. Alterations to the ground floor of the hotel were made in 1967, (at which time also the first Cairns Hotel was demolished and replaced with a motel wing), and again in 1976, when the two shops facing Shields Street were converted to a bar. The motel does not form part of the listing in the Queensland Heritage Register.

== Description ==
Hides Hotel, located on the southern corner of Lake and Shields Streets, is a three-storeyed, rendered reinforced concrete structure with a U-shaped hipped corrugated iron roof concealed behind a parapet wall. The roof surrounds a central light shaft to the two upper floors, which does not extend to the ground floor, and has a raised lift motor room at the eastern end. A single-storeyed kitchen is attached at the rear.

The building has a wide first floor timber verandah to both street frontages, with wide batten balustrade, hardboard panelled ceiling and a corrugated iron skillion awning.

The ground floor facade has been altered, with a pebble render finish to the walls and non-original window and door units, some of which are in the original openings. The first floor has timber framed, multi-paned doors with fanlights, most of which have air conditioning units inserted, opening onto the verandah.

The second floor has aluminium framed hopper windows in original arched openings which are framed by rendered mouldings and pilasters. The Lake Street elevation has the words HIDES CAIRNS HOTEL along the parapet, and a slightly recessed central bay with a balcony, rendered balustrade and a central flagpole on a rendered scrolled base at the parapet. The Shields Street elevation is less symmetrical, with two slightly recessed bays, the eastern one having a balcony with a rendered balustrade and a flagpole on a rendered scrolled base at the parapet. All windows have rounded pressed metal hoods with square bases.

Internally, the building retains the original lift and a timber staircase with cross-braced balustrade. The original office and reception area, Public Bar and toilets on the ground floor have been altered, and the Shields Street shops have been converted into a bar area, but many of the original plastered ceilings and a section of herringbone parquet flooring in the dining room remain intact. Air conditioning ducting has been inserted throughout. The first floor lounge has plastered columns with a coffered plastered ceiling, but the timber skirtings have been removed. Some bedrooms have been converted into ensuite bathrooms.

== Heritage listing ==
Hides Hotel was listed on the Queensland Heritage Register on 21 October 1992 having satisfied the following criteria.

The place is important in demonstrating the evolution or pattern of Queensland's history.

Hides Hotel, Cairns, constructed 1928–c. 1936, is important in demonstrating the evolution of Queensland's history, being associated with the third phase of Cairns' development: its growth as the principal city of far North Queensland in the interwar years.

The place is important in demonstrating the principal characteristics of a particular class of cultural places.

It is important in demonstrating the principal characteristics of a substantial, first-class, three-storeyed, inter-war masonry hotel in Cairns, which retains a high degree of intactness and has functioned as a hotel for over 7 decades.

The place is important because of its aesthetic significance.

The place exhibits a range of aesthetic characteristics valued by the Cairns community, in particular: the contribution of the building, through its siting, scale, form and material, to the streetscapes of Lake and Shields streets and to the Cairns townscape; the quality of surviving original interior finishes, including plaster work; and the wide timber verandahs.

The place has a strong or special association with a particular community or cultural group for social, cultural or spiritual reasons.

It has a special association for the Cairns community, with a Hides' Hotel being part of the social fabric of Cairns since 1885.
