= Otaki (1875 ship) =

Ship built in 1875

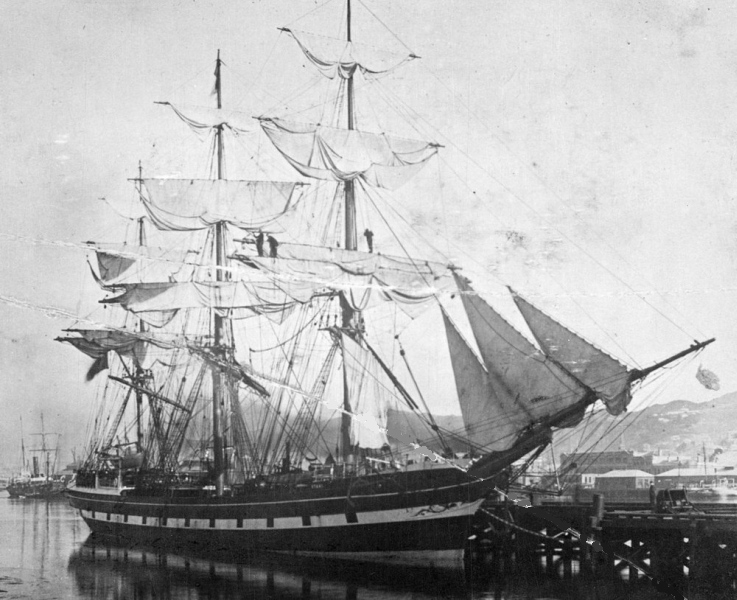

The Otaki was a sailing ship of the New Zealand Shipping Company. It was built in 1875 by Palmers at Jarrow-on-Tyne, England.

She made 15 voyages out and home altogether, and, with the exception of three passages outwards, she never exceeded 100 days. Her runs to Auckland (three) were all under the average.

She once made a run from Port Chalmers to London in 1877, taking only 63 days to make the trip.

The Otaki "was a fast sailer, but generally was unfortunate with the weather".

== Later history ==
She was sold in January 1892 to Germans and renamed Dr Siegert.

Dr. Siegert's company bought the Otaki to use for the business which he had set up in Venezuela and was relocating to Trinidad.

On 4 July 1895, she grounded on Diamond Rocks, she had been bound from Port of Spain, Trinidad, to Bremen with asphalt.

She was beached at Trinidad, and later sank in the Bocas abandoned as a total loss.
