= William Doxford & Sons =

British shipbuilding company and maker of marine diesel engines

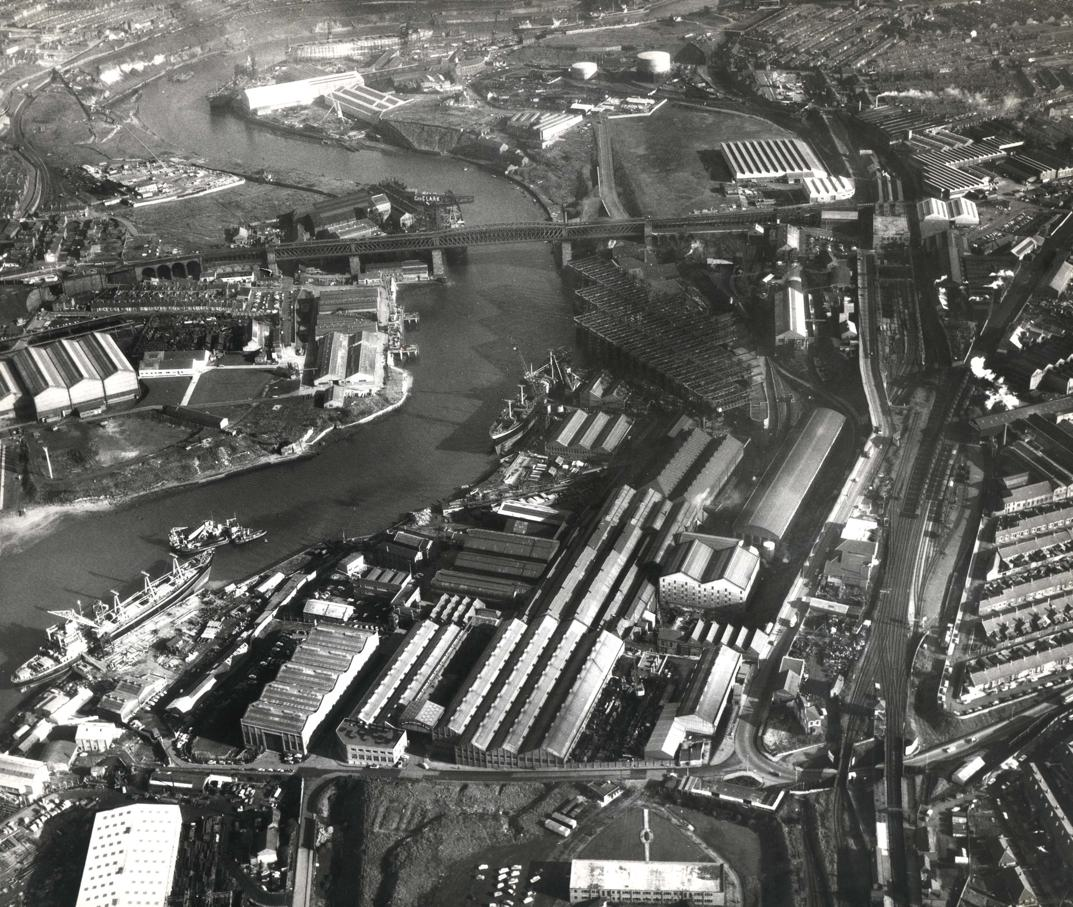
- William Doxford & Sons' shipyard and engine works, River Wear 1967
- Company type: Private
- Industry: Shipbuilding; Diesel engines
- Founded: 1840
- Defunct: 1986
- Fate: Acquired
- Successor: A&P Group
- Headquarters: Sunderland, UK
- Key people: William Doxford

William Doxford & Sons Ltd, often referred to simply as Doxford, was a British shipbuilding and marine engineering company.

== History ==
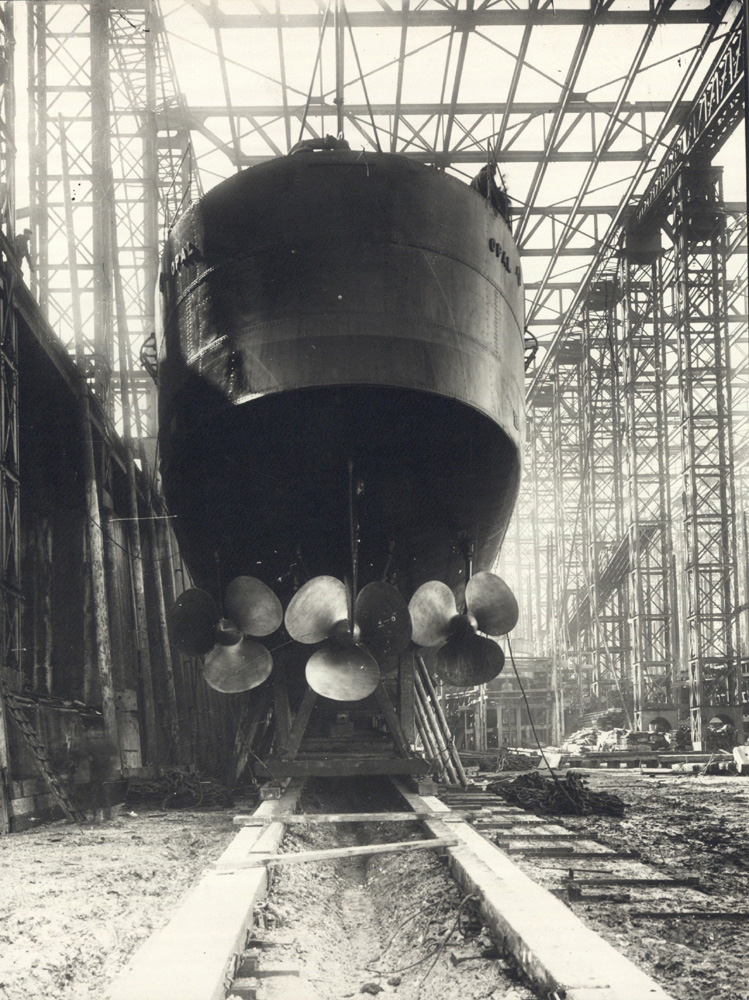
HMS Opal at Doxford, ready for launch, 11 September 1915.

William Doxford founded the company in 1840. From 1870 it was based in Pallion, Sunderland, on the River Wear in Northeast England. The Company was managed by William Doxford's four sons following his death in 1882. It was acquired by Northumberland Shipbuilding Company in 1918.

It was renamed Doxford & Sunderland Shipbuilding & Engineering Co Ltd in 1961 and Doxford & Sunderland Ltd in 1966. Court Line took it over in 1972 and renamed it Sunderland Shipbuilders Ltd.

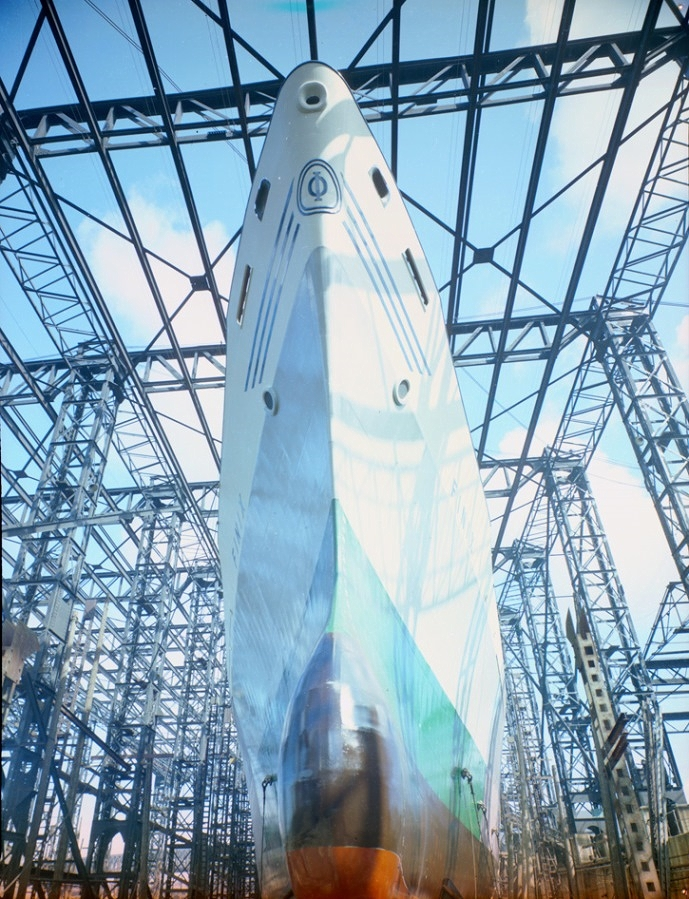
Cargo ship Finix ready for launch, 18 April 1969

In the 1970s a new all-weather Pallion yard was built which could build two ships of up to 30,000 tons deadweight side-by-side. The steel came in at one end, and the completed ship left from the other with engines installed and sometimes with the machinery running.

Court Line collapsed in 1974 and the company was nationalised. It was privatised in 1986 when it was merged with Austin & Pickersgill to form North East Shipbuilders. However, the last ship built at Pallion was floated out of the yard in 1989 after which it closed as a shipbuilding yard. The old shipyard is now occupied by Pallion Engineering Limited, whilst the former marine engine works is occupied by W.H.Forster (Printers) Ltd.

== Operations ==
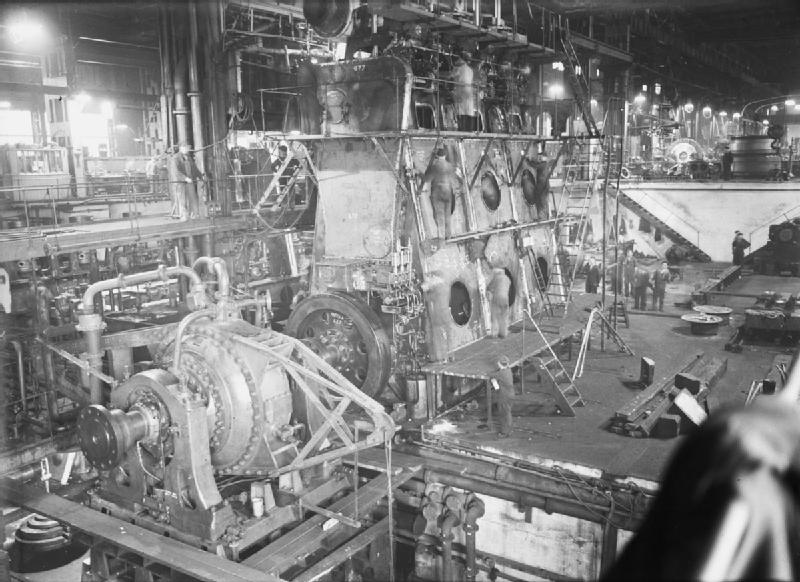
The engine shop at Doxford's shipyard during the Second World War: the diesel engine of a merchant ship is undergoing tests.

Doxford was a major British shipbuilder. It also made marine diesel engines, the last of which it built in 1980.

== See also ==
- List of shipbuilders and shipyards
- Turret deck ship
- HMS Opal (1875)
- HMS Opal (1915)
- Badagry Palm (1979) – the last Doxford marine engine (J-Type)
- SS Waikato
