= SS Waikato =

Cargo ship

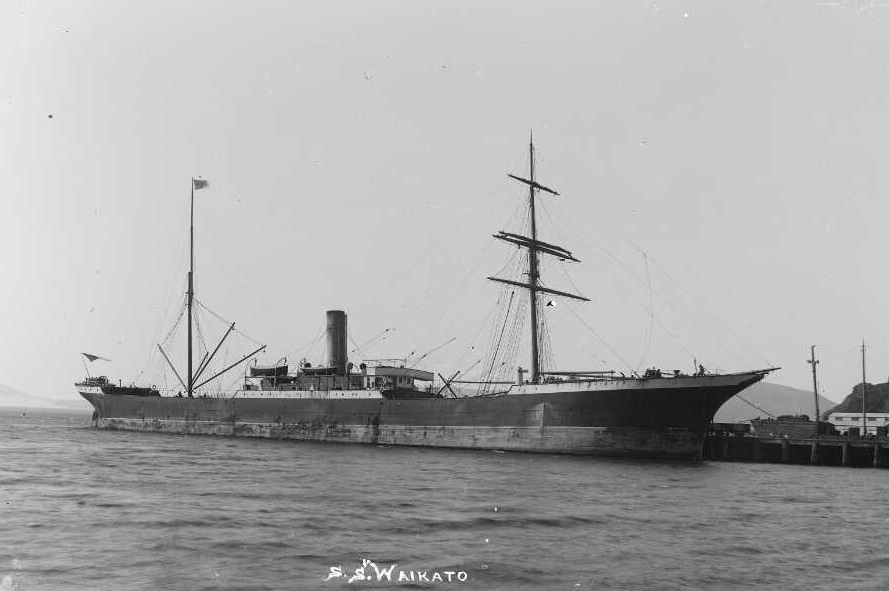
- SS Waikato at Port Chalmers

History
- Name: Waikato (1892–1905) Augustus (1905–1912) Teresa Accame (1912–1923)
- Owner: New Zealand Shipping Company (1892–1905); C. Andersen (1905–1911); Emil R. Retzlaff (1911–1912); Fratelli Accame di Luigi (1912–1923)
- Builder: William Doxford & Sons, Sunderland
- Completed: 1892
- Fate: Scrapped 1923

General characteristics
- Tonnage: 4,767 GRT, 3,071 NRT
- Length: 400 ft (120 m)
- Beam: 48 ft (15 m)
- Capacity: 70,000 carcases of frozen mutton and 6 or 7 thousand bales of wool.

SS Waikato was a refrigerated cargo ship built for the New Zealand Shipping Company. She became famous in 1899, when she was involved in a drifting incident, when she broke down off the South African coast and drifted for 103 days before being discovered and towed to Australia.

== Background ==
The ship was built in 1892, by William Doxford & Sons of Sunderland for the New Zealand Shipping Company. She measured 400 ft (120 m) long, by 48 ft (15 m) wide, and 29.3 ft (8.9 m) deep. She was designed for trade between the United Kingdom and New Zealand, her refrigerated chambers had capacity for 70,000 carcases of frozen mutton, and she could also carry six or seven thousand bales of wool.

She was powered by a triple expansion steam engine, via a single propeller.

== 1899 drifting incident ==
On the night of 5 June 1899, when the Waikato was on a voyage from London to Wellington, located approximately 120 miles (190 km) from Cape Agulhas (the geographic southern tip of Africa) the ship's propeller shaft sheared within the stern tube, a location impossible to repair at sea, disabling the ship. Reaching land in a small boat was ruled out as too dangerous, due to the distance and strong currents, and so the crew decided that they had no alternative other than to drift and hope that they would be sighted and put into tow.

From then on the ship was adrift for the following 103 days, some days drifting as much as 100 miles (160 km), often drifting in random directions, and doubling back on their previous course. On 28 July the ship was sighted by the barquentine Takora, which attempted unsuccessfully to tow the Waikato. On 2 August they sighted a Danish ship, Aalbuy which refused to tow them, but refreshed their food provisions. Finally, on 15 September the ship was sighted by a tramp steamer Asloun and taken into tow, where she was taken to Fremantle, Western Australia, arriving on 12 October. By the time the Waikato was found, she had drifted about 2,500 miles (4,000 km) in total, and 1,800 miles (2,900 km) in an easterly direction.

In 1909 Mr. J. A. P. Turnbull, who was second officer on the Waikato gave the following description of the events:

"The Waikato was a steamer of about 5,000 tons, bound from London to Wellington, New Zealand. On the night of June. 5, 1899, we were suddenly aroused by a terrific noise in the engine-room, the engines running away with a loud buzzing noise, and the ship vibrating horribly. When at last steam was shut off, and an examination made, it was found that the tail-shaft had snapped in the stern tube in a place impossible to repair at sea without' cutting the stern-tube and tipping the ship, an experiment our engineers would not risk in such a rough and unsettled part of the ocean. The Waikato carried a fair amount of square sail on her foremast, and we were able to rig a small jury mast as a main mast, but they might just as well have been set on the flagstaff, as they were continually blowing away without giving the ship steerage-way and, though several sea-anchors were tried, none of them were successful in keeping the ship's head to sea, and she drifted broadside, to the seas' rolling continually. Luckily for us, she made such a broad smooth wake going sideways, that some of the force of the seas were reduced before reaching us. But it was anything but pleasant to have big Cape rollers tumbling down on us, looking as if they must roll right over us. However, no serious damage was done.

"At the time of our breakdown we were 120 miles from Cape Agulhas, and suggestions-were made that a boat should be sent to try and make for the coast, but the captain and officers thought that it would be almost impossible to reach land against the strong Agulhas current that runs down the South African coast, past Port Natal, East London; and Algoa Bay, so there was nothing for it but to wait in hope of being picked up. At night we had a huge flare-up, consisting of a large iron drum on the upper deck, with a coal fire in it. On this, at short intervals' oil was thrown, which blazed up, lighting up the sea for miles around. "The current took us at first in a westerly direction,, and then shot us off down south, to a latitude of 40deg. the ship drifting as much as 60, 80, or 100 miles a day. Some days when we expected to be driven north by the gales, we would find instead that we were miles south of the previous day's position. We were adrift for 52 days without sighting a sail, rolling and wallowing all the while between latitudes 36deg and 40deg. south, gradually working east.

On the 103rd day the tramp steamer Asloun hove in sight, and at last our long wait was to be ended in lon. 60deg east, lat 41deg south. After drifting about 2,500 miles, and 1,800 miles in an easterly direction, going round in squares, circles, and triangles, and crossing our own track several times, we were really in tow at last, heading for Freemantle, W.A. The Waikato's hull was undamaged, with the exception of the loss of a good many of our deck fittings. Oil was used with very good effect when the seas were extra high".

== Later history ==
In 1905, the ship was sold to C. Andersen of Hamburg, Germany, and renamed Augustus. In 1911 she was sold to Emil R. Retzlaff of Stettin, and then the following year sold again to Fratelli Accame di Luigi of Genoa, Italy, and renamed again Teresa Accame. In 1923 the ship was scrapped at Spezia.
