= New Zealand Shipping Company =

Shipping company New Zealand to Great Britain, passenger and cargo

- House flag

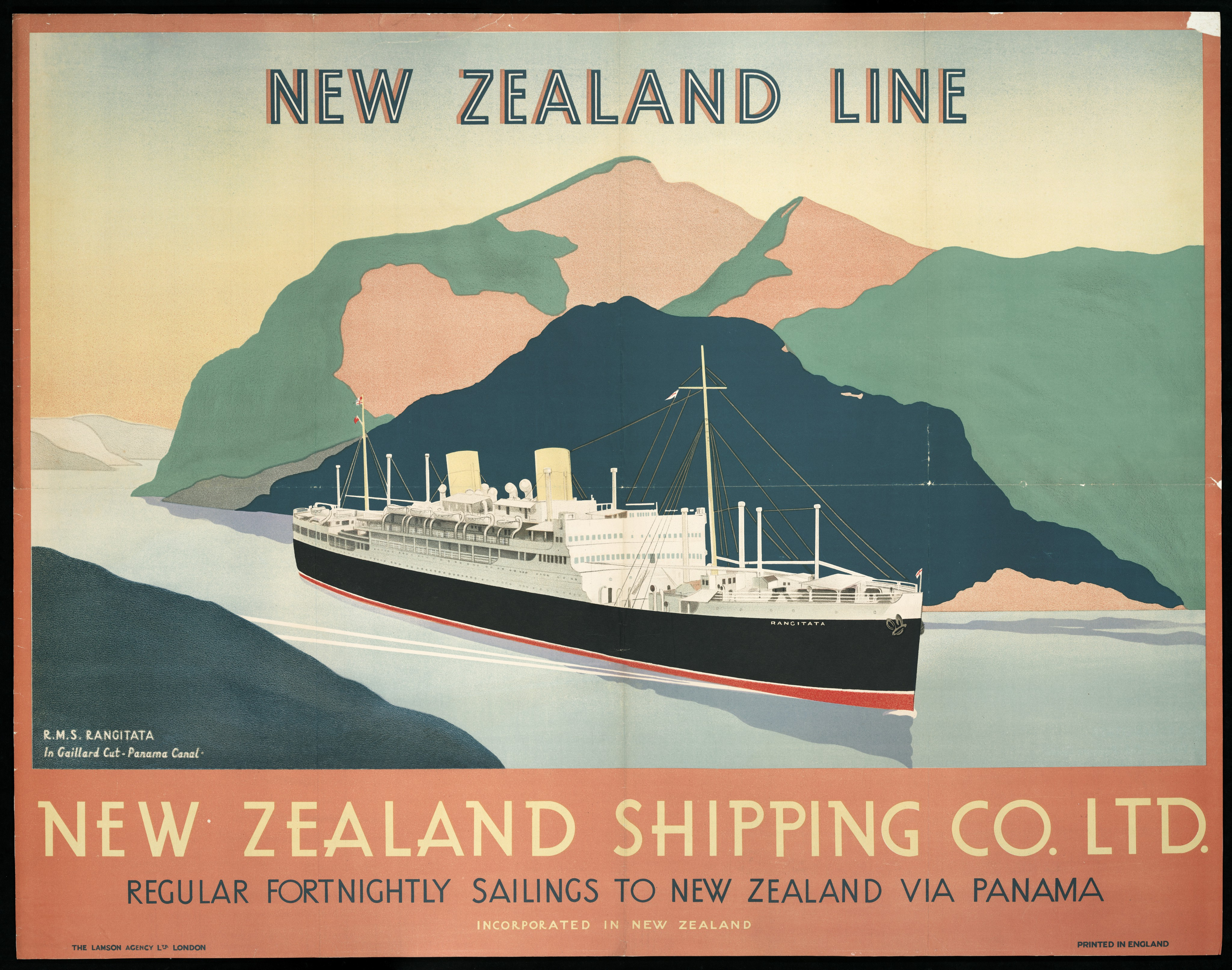
- Industry: Transport
- Founded: 1873
- Defunct: 1973
- Successor: P&O
- Headquarters: London, England
- Products: Passenger and Cargo Shipping

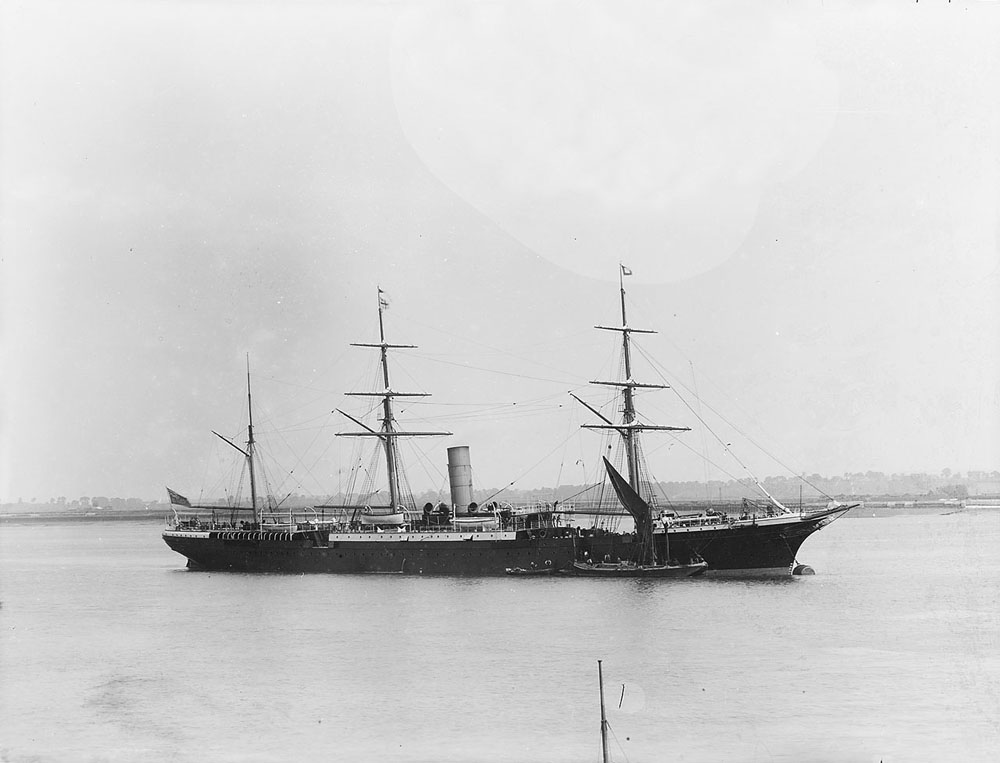
Tongariro in 1883

The New Zealand Shipping Company (NZSC) was a shipping company whose ships ran passenger and cargo services between Great Britain and New Zealand between 1873 and 1973.

A group of Christchurch businessmen founded the company in 1873, similar groups formed in the other main centres, to counter the dominance of the Shaw, Savill & Albion Line. There were seven initial directors: John Coster, George Gould, John Thomas Peacock, William Reeves, Robert Heaton Rhodes, John Anderson, and Reginald Cobb) representing the New Zealand Loan & Mercantile Agency.

The similar groups of businessmen in Dunedin and Wellington soon joined this Christchurch company followed by the Auckland group. They completed the four-main-centre link in July 1873. John Johnston Wellington, John Logan Campbell Auckland, and Evan Prosser of Dunedin were elected to the main board. A Captain Ashby opened an office off New Broad Street London and chartered two ships carrying 500 government emigrants: Punjaub 883 tons and Adamant 815 tons set to sail for Canterbury on 31 May and 20 June respectively with full cargo. By November 1873 they had purchased two vessels, Hindostan and Dilfillan and chartered eighteen. Two 1,000 ton ships were scheduled to be launched the same month and named Waikato and Waitangi.

The company gradually established a fleet of vessels, using Māori names for each. From 1875 the livery consisted of black hulls, white superstructure and yellow funnels.

In 1882, the company's ships were equipped with refrigeration. and a frozen meat service began from New Zealand to England.

Company policy dictated a stop at Pitcairn Islands, in the Pacific Ocean, to break the monotony of the ocean crossing.

== Federal Steam Navigation Company ==
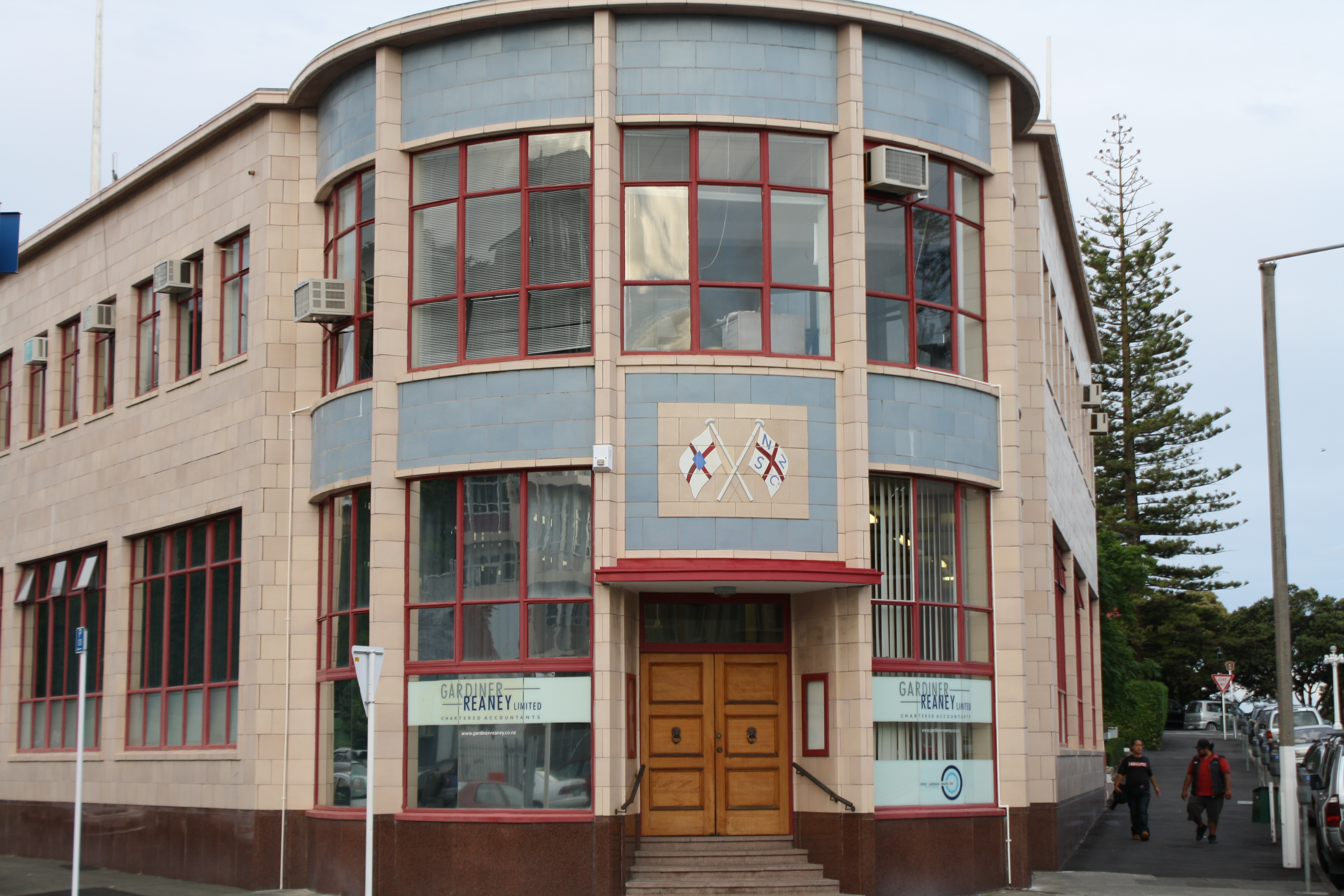
Former New Zealand Shipping Company Building in Napier, still displaying the NZSC logo

In 1894 Allan Hughes bought Money Wigram & Sons and renamed it King Steam Navigation, but changed the name to the Federal Steam Navigation Co Ltd (FSNC) in 1895. Federal-Houlder-Shire Lines was established in 1904 by the merger of FSNC, Houlder Brothers and Company, and the Scottish Shire Line owned by Turnbull, Martin and Company. On 3 January 1912 an agreement was reached whereby the New Zealand Shipping Company absorbed the Federal Steam Navigation Company, which at the time owned ten steamships trading between Australia, New Zealand and the UK. Ships owned in 1912 were Wiltshire, Cornwall, Devon, Dorset, Durham, Essex, Kent, Norfolk, Shropshire (Rotorua from 1923), Somerset, Suffolk, Surrey and Sussex. Argyllshire was bought from Scottish Shire Line in 1930. Federal Steam ships retained their house flag, and continued to be named after English counties, thereby retaining their Federal Steam identity. Federal Steam was registered in England for tax purposes, whereas the New Zealand Shipping Company continued to be registered in New Zealand.

== World wars ==
In World War I the NZSC lost nine ships from a fleet of 32. In World War II it lost 19 ships from a fleet of 36.

== Closure ==
The services of both companies were absorbed into P&O in 1973 after 100 years of service. P&O had bought NZSC in October 1916, but left it largely independent.

== Ships ==
NZSC operated numerous ships, some purpose built, others acquired from other operators by purchase, lease or charter.

Ship	Type	Date launched	Date acquired	Date disposed	Fate/ next assignment
Aorangi	refrigerated cargo and passenger steamship	1883		1914	Scrapped 1925
British King	cargo and passenger ship	1881	chartered 1882	1884	Scuttled at Port Arthur 1904
Coptic	cargo and passenger steamship	1881	chartered 1883	1884	Scrapped 1926
Doric	cargo and passenger steamship	1883	chartered 1883	1884	Wrecked 1911
Fenstanton	steamship	1882	chartered 1883	1884	Grounded and wrecked
Haparangi	refrigerated cargo motor ship	1947	1947	1966	Transferred to Federal Steam Navigation Co
Hauraki	refrigerated cargo motor ship	1946	1947	1966	Transferred to Federal Steam Navigation Co
Hinakura	refrigerated cargo motor ship	1949	1949	1966	Transferred to Federal Steam Navigation Co
Hororata	refrigerated cargo and passenger steamship	1913	1914	1939	Transferred to another P&O subsidiary, British India Steam Navigation Company
Hororata	refrigerated cargo steamship	1941	1942	1966	Transferred to Federal Steam Navigation Co
Hurunui (1)	cargo and passenger sailing ship	1875		1883	Collided and sank Waitara, 22 June 1883
Hurunui (2)	refrigerated cargo steamship	1911	1912	1918	Sunk by torpedo off The Lizard by U-94, 18 May 1918
Hurunui (3)	refrigerated cargo steamship	1921		1940	Sunk by torpedo on 15 October 1940 by U-93
Ionic	cargo and passenger ship	1883	chartered 1883	1884	Scrapped 1908
Kaikoura (1)	cargo and passenger steamship	1884	1884	1899	Transferred to British India Steam
Kaikoura (2)	refrigerated cargo and passenger steamship	1903		1926	Sold
Kaikoura	refrigerated cargo motor ship	1937	1937	1954	Transferred to another P&O subsidiary, Avenue Shipping Co Ltd
Kaimata	motor ship	1931	1936 (former Ardenvohr)	1954	Transferred to Avenue Shipping Co Ltd
Kaipaki	refrigerated cargo motor ship	1939	1939	1955	Transferred to Avenue Shipping Co Ltd
Kaipara	refrigerated cargo and passenger steamship	1903		1914	Stopped and sunk by SMS Kaiser Wilhelm der Grosse, 16 August 1914
Kohinur	motor ship	1962	1963	1965	Transferred to another P&O subsidiary,Hain-Nourse Ltd
Mataura (1)	barque	1868	1874 (former Dunfillan)	1894	Sold and renamed Alida. Wrecked 1900
Mataura (2)	refrigerated cargo and passenger steamship	1896		1898	Wrecked in the Strait of Magellan 12 January 1898
Nurjehan	motor ship	1963	1963	1964	Transferred to Hain-Nourse
Opawa	sailing ship	1876	1876	1899	Sold to M. F. & S. O. Stray. Kristiansand
Opawa	refrigerated cargo steamship	1906	1907	1928	Sold to Brunn & von der Lippe,Tonsberg
Opawa	refrigerated cargo motor ship	1931		1942	Sunk by U-106, 6 February 1942
Orari	refrigerated cargo steamship	1906	1906	1927	Scrapped at Troon
Orari	refrigerated cargo motor ship	1930	1931	1958	Sold to Italy and renamed Capo Bianco
Otaio	refrigerated cargo motor ship	1930		1941	Sunk by U-558, 28 August 1941
Otaio	refrigerated cargo and passenger motor ship	1957	1958	1966	Transferred to Federal Steam Navigation Co
Otaki (1)	sailing ship	1875		1896	Sold and renamed Dr. Siegert
Otaki (2)	refrigerated cargo and passenger steamship	1908		1917	Sunk by the German raider SMS Möwe 10 March 1917
Otaki (3)	refrigerated cargo steamship	1919	1920	1934	Sold to Clan Line and renamed Clan Robertson
Otaki (4)	refrigerated cargo motor ship	1952	1953	1967	Transferred to Federal Steam Navigation Co
Otorama	steamship	1890	former Sea King	1902	Sold
Otorama	refrigerated cargo and passenger steamship	1912	1919 (former Ajana)	1928	Sold to D. & E. Fratelli Bozzo, Genoa
Papanui	steamship	1898		1910	Sold after damage
Papanui	refrigerated cargo steamship	1942	1943	1965	Scrapped at Kaohsiung
Paparoa	refrigerated cargo and passenger steamship	1899			17 March 1926 caught fire in the South Atlantic, scuttled by HMS Birmingham
Paparoa	refrigerated cargo steamship	1943	1943	1966	Transferred to Federal Steam Navigation Co
Pareora	cargo and passenger steamship	1855	1877 (former White Eagle)	1887	Scrapped in 1888
Paringa	refrigerated cargo motor ship	1936	1946 (former Essex)	1955	Transferred to Federal Steam Navigation Co
Petone	steamship	1899	1900 (former Gresham)	1910	Sold to Canterbury Steam Shipping
Piako (1)	clipper	1876	1877	1891	Sold, lost 1900
Piako (2)	refrigerated cargo steamship	1920	1920 (former War Orestes)	1941	Sunk by torpedo on 18 May 1941 by U-107
Piako (3)	refrigerated cargo and passenger ship	1961	1962	1979	Sold to Blue Ocean Compania Maritima SA. Scrapped 1984
Pipiriki	refrigerated cargo steamship	1943	1944	1966	Transferred to Federal Steam Navigation Co
Quiloa	oil tanker steamship	1958	1960	1968	Transferred to British India Steam
Rakaia	cargo and passenger motor ship	1944	1946 (former Empire Abercorn)	1971	Scrapped
Rakanoa					
Rangitane (1)	passenger motor ship	1929	1929	1940	Sunk by shellfire by the German raiders Orion and Komet, 26 November 1940
Rangitane (2)	passenger motor ship	1949	1949	May 1968	Sold to CY Tung, Scrapped Taiwan, 1976
RMS Rangitata	passenger motor ship	26 March 1929	1929	1962	Scrapped
RMS Rangitiki	passenger motor ship	1929	1929	1962	Scrapped
Rangitoto	passenger motor ship	1949	1949	1969	Sold to CY Tung, Scrapped Hong Kong, 1976
Remuera (1)	passenger steamship	1911		1940	Sunk by aerial torpedo 26 August 1940
Remuera (2)	steam cargo and passenger steamship	1947	1961 (former Parthia)	1964	Sold to Eastern & Australia Steamship Company.
Rimutaka (1)	steamship	1884	1885	1899	Transferred to British India Steam
Rimutaka (2)	refrigerated cargo and passenger ship	1900	1901	1930	Scrapped by T.W.Ward Ltd, Pembroke Dock
Rimutaka (3)	refrigerated cargo and passenger steamship	1922	1938 (former Mongolia)	1950	Sold to Incres Shipping Company
Rotorua (1)	refrigerated cargo and passenger steamship	1910		1917	Sunk by torpedo on 22 March 1917 by SM UC-17
Rotorua (2)	refrigerated cargo and passenger steamship	1910	1936 (former Shropshire)	1940	Sunk by torpedo on 11 December 1940 by U-96
Ruahine (1)	steamship	1891		1900	Sold to La Trasatlántica
Ruahine (2)	refrigerated cargo steamship	1909		1949	Sold to Italian owners; scrapped 1957
Ruahine (3)	passenger motor ship	1950	1951	1968	re-registered in Hong Kong; scrapped 1974
Ruapehu	cargo and passenger ship	1883	1884	1899	Transferred to British India Steam
Ruapehu (10)	refrigerated cargo and passenger ship	1901		1931	Sold for scrap 5 August 1931
Stad Haarlem	cargo and passenger ship	1875	leased 1879		
Tekoa	steamship	1890		1902	Sold
Tongariro	passenger and cargo steamship	1883	1883	1899	Transferred to British India Steam
Tongariro	refrigerated cargo and passenger steamship	1900	1901	1916	Wrecked on Bull Rock, 30 August 1916
Tongariro	refrigerated cargo steamship	1924	1925	1960	Scrapped in Hong Kong
Treneglos	motor ship	1963	1963	1965	Transferred to Hain-Nourse
Turakina	sailing ship	1868	1882 (former City of Perth)	1899	Sold to Alexander Bech, Tvedestrand
Turakina (1)	refrigerated cargo and passenger steamship	1902		1917	Sunk by torpedo in the Western Approaches by U-86, 13 August 1917
Turakina (2)	refrigerated cargo steamship	1923	1923	1940	Sunk by shellfire in the Tasman Sea by the German raider Orion, 20 August 1940
Waikato	sailing ship	1874		1898	Sold
Waimate	refrigerated cargo and passenger ship	1896		1925	Scrapped
Waitara	cargo and passenger sailing ship	1863	1873 (former Hindostan)	1883	Wrecked following a collision with Hurunui
Wakanui	refrigerated cargo and passenger steamship	1899		1913	Sold
Wanganui	sailing ship	1877	1877	1888	Sold to Capt. John Leslie
Warrimoo	passenger steamship	1892	1899	1901	Sold to Union Company
Whakatane	refrigerated cargo steamship	1900		1924	Sold
Whakatane	motor ship	1954	1954	1964	Transferred to Union, another P&O company
Whangaroa	motor ship	1955	1955	1965	Transferred to Union
Wharanui	refrigerated cargo motor ship	1956	1956	1967	Transferred to Federal Steam Navigation Co

== House flags ==
House flag

For ships powered by both sail and steam, a flag with an additional pennant was used.

Sometimes the company used a flag with black letters.

Another flag commonly used in the long history of the company, most often along with other flags. It was originally a flag of the Federal Steam Navigation Company.

== See also ==
- NZ Shipping Co Ltd v A M Satterthwaite & Co Ltd, a leading case on contract law
- SS Cambridge
- SS Hertford
- SS Huntingdon
- SS Waikato
- MV Nottingham
- Isthmian Steamship Company
- Owen Cox

== Bibliography ==
- Clarkson, John (1995). New Zealand and Federal lines. Preston, U.K.: J. & M. Clarkson. ISBN 0-9521179-5-9. OCLC 35599714.
- McLean, Gavin (2001). Captain's Log: New Zealand's Maritime History (Softcover). Auckland, NZ: Hodder Moa Books. ISBN 1-86958-881-9.
- Waters, Sydney D (1939). Clipper Ship to Motor Liner: The story of the New Zealand Shipping Company 1873–1939. London: The New Zealand Shipping Company Ltd.
