= SS Rotorua (1910) =

New Zealand Shipping Company steam ocean liner and refrigerated cargo ship

Coordinates: 50°18′47″N 03°00′13″W

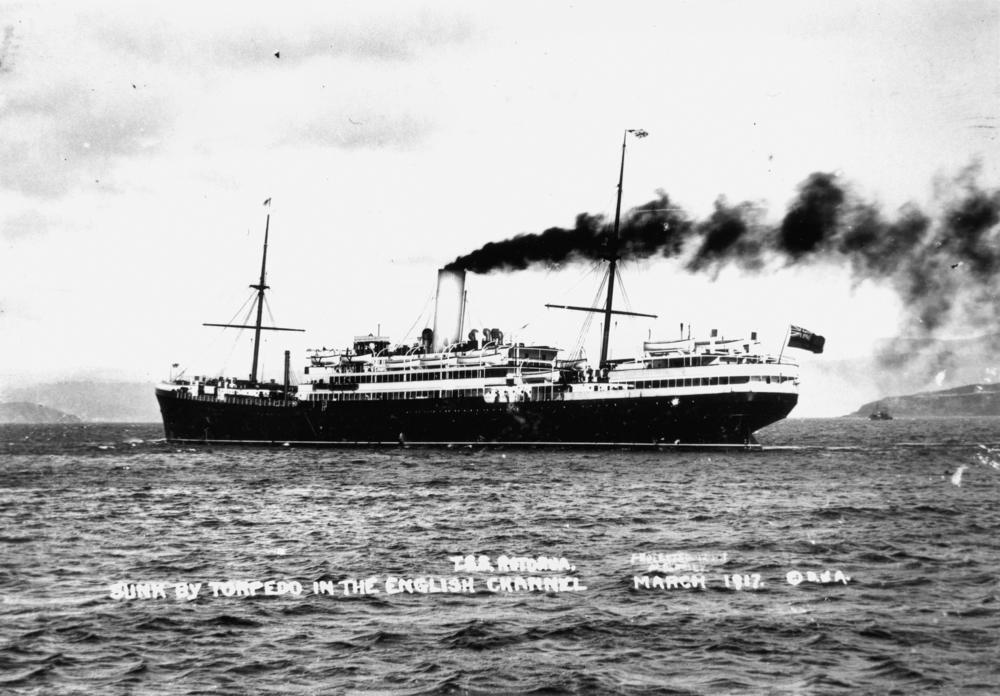
- Rotorua

History

United Kingdom
- Name: Rotorua
- Namesake: Rotorua
- Owner: 1910: George T Haycraft; 1912: New Zealand Shipping Company
- Operator: 1910: J Cowan & GL King; 1912: New Zealand Shipping Company
- Port of registry: Plymouth
- Route: London – Plymouth – Canary Islands – Cape Town – Hobart – Wellington; or: London – Plymouth – Canary Islands – Montevideo – Wellington
- Builder: Wm Denny & Bros, Dumbarton
- Cost: £172,483
- Yard number: 915
- Launched: 9 July 1910
- Completed: 8 October 1910
- Identification: UK official number 124587; code letters HRSG; call sign MKE
- Fate: Sunk by torpedo, 22 March 1917

General characteristics
- Type: Ocean liner
- Tonnage: 11,130 GRT, 7,094 NRT, 10,600 DWT
- Length: 484.2 ft (147.6 m)
- Beam: 62.3 ft (19.0 m)
- Draught: 29.4 ft (9.0 m)
- Depth: 41.1 ft (12.5 m)
- Decks: 3
- Installed power: 605 NHP, 8,631 ihp
- Propulsion: 2 × triple-expansion steam engines; 1 × low-pressure steam turbine; 3 × screws
- Speed: 15 knots (28 km/h)
- Capacity: passengers: 52 first class; 88 second class; 440 third class; cargo: 299,540 cubic feet (8,482 m^{3}) refrigerated; 194,180 cubic feet (5,499 m^{3}) non-refrigerated
- Crew: 144
- Armament: (as DEMS): 1 × 4.7-inch gun
- Notes: sister ships: Ruahine, Remuera

SS Rotorua was a New Zealand Shipping Company steam ocean liner and refrigerated cargo ship that was built in Scotland in 1910 and sunk by a U-boat in 1917.

She was not the only NZ Shipping Co ship to be called Rotorua. There was also a ship that was launched in 1911 as Shropshire for the Federal Steam Navigation Company, transferred to the NZ Shipping Co fleet in 1936 and renamed Rotorua. She was sunk by a U-boat in 1940.

== Building ==
The NZ Shipping Co ordered Rotorua as a sister ship for Ruahine, which William Denny and Brothers of Dumbarton had launched in 1909. Mrs George T Haycraft, wife of one of the NZ Shipping Co's directors, launched Rotorua on 9 July 1910. The ship was completed on 8 October. She was 484.2 ft (147.6 m) long, her beam was 62.3 ft (19.0 m) and her tonnages were 11,130 GRT and 7,094 NRT. Rotorua was slightly larger than Ruahine, and at the time was the largest ship yet built in Dumbarton.

Whereas Ruahine had two screws, each driven by a triple-expansion steam engine, Rotorua had three screws, with Denny's applying the same engine layout that they had pioneered in the refrigerated cargo liner Otaki that they had built for the NZ Shipping Co and launched in 1908. A triple-expansion engine drove her port and starboard screws. Exhaust steam from the low-pressure cylinder of each of those engines powered a Parsons turbine that drove her centre shaft. Between them the two triple-expansion engines developed 5,350 ihp and the turbine developed another 3,281 ihp. Together the three engines were rated at 605 NHP. On her sea trials Rotorua achieved a top speed of 15.77 knots (29.21 km/h).

Rotorua's holds had 299,540 cubic feet (8,482 m^{3}) of refrigerated cargo space, primarily for frozen mutton, and 194,180 cubic feet (5,499 m^{3}) of space for non-refrigerated cargo. She had derricks able to lift up to 25 tons.

Rotorua had berths for 580 passengers: 52 first class, 88 second class, 440 third class. She carried 14 lifeboats and two whaleboats. Because her beam was 2 feet (0.6 m) broader than Ruahine's, Rotorua's public saloons were slightly broader. She had a children's nursery, her first class lounge was decorated in Adam style, and her first class dining saloon had a pipe organ.

The NZ Shipping Co registered Rotorua at Plymouth. Her UK official number was 124587 and her code letters were HRSG.

== Peacetime service ==
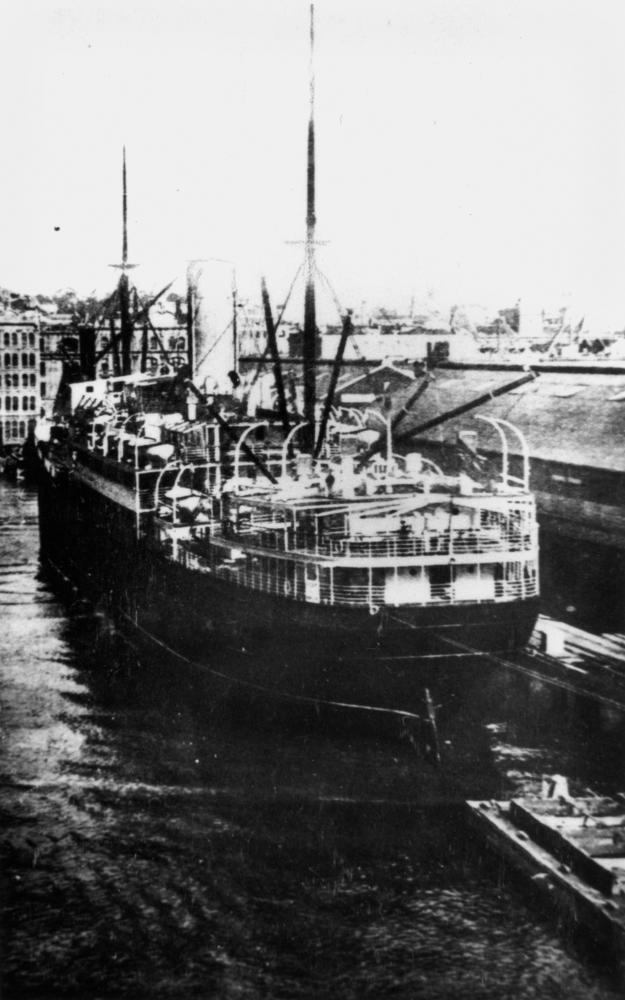
Rotorua in Auckland

In October 1910 Rotorua was put on public display in the Royal Albert Dock, London. She began her maiden voyage from London on 27 October and called at Plymouth two days later. She called Las Palmas on 3 November, Cape Town on 18 November and Hobart on 6 December. Her arrival in Wellington on 11 December was front-page news. She completed the voyage from England in 42 days and 20 hours, and crossing the Tasman Sea she averaged 14 knots (26 km/h).

Early in 1911 the Irish Parliamentary Party politicians John Donovan, Richard Hazleton and William Redmond sailed on Rotorua to Tasmania and New Zealand to seek support for Irish home rule.

Rotorua first visited Auckland on 18 May 1911. Again she was put on public display.

On 31 May 1911 Denny's launched Remuera, another sister ship for Ruahine and Rotorua. Remuera was slightly larger than her sisters, and so supplanted Rotorua as the largest ship built at Dumbarton and the largest ship in the NZ Shipping Company's fleet.

Early in 1913 the New Zealand Government experimented by shipping 3,000 eggs to England aboard Rotorua. The eggs were kept at 45 °F (7 °C) throughout the 16,000-nautical-mile (30,000 km) voyage. When they arrived in London six weeks later they were reported to be "in splendid condition".

By 1914 Rotorua was equipped for wireless telegraphy. The Marconi Company operated her equipment on the standard 300 and 600 metre wavelengths. Her call sign was MKE.

== First World War ==
When the First World War began on 28 July 1914, Rotorua was in the Atlantic on her way to England. About a week later she reached the neutral port of Santa Cruz de Tenerife, where she was instructed to stay for safety. After some days she was instructed to proceed, with all her lights blacked out. She reached Plymouth and London without incident.

On her return voyage to New Zealand in October 1914, Rotorua did not call at Cape Town but continued to Hobart without stopping. On another voyage to New Zealand in July and August 1915, Rotorua did not call at Santa Cruz de Tenerife. Both omissions were for wartime safety.

During the war Rotorua was defensively armed with one 4.7-inch gun on her poop deck.

By March 1915 Rotorua the marking "F 529" had been applied to both sides of Rotorua amidships. This was an identification mark, like a pennant number. The "F" indicated that she carried food, and therefore should be prioritised over other cargo ships for piloting and bunkering.

In February 1916 Rotorua repatriated 203 members of the New Zealand Expeditionary Force who had been discharged from hospitals in the UK. The soldiers shared Rotorua's third class accommodation with 130 civilian passengers. Third class aboard Rotorua included access to her forward well deck, but she not long after she left England some of the civilians complained about the soldiers. Thereafter the soldiers were barred from that part of the ship until about a week before she reached Auckland. This was not how they expected civilians to treat them after they had been in combat and wounded.

In July 1916 Rotorua repatriated another 56 invalided New Zealand soldiers.

The Panama Canal had been opened in August 1914, and on 3 May 1916 the Union Company announced that it would route Rotorua and Remuera via the canal instead of via Cape Town. However, a month later the company announced that Rotorua was going via Cape Town and Hobart instead.

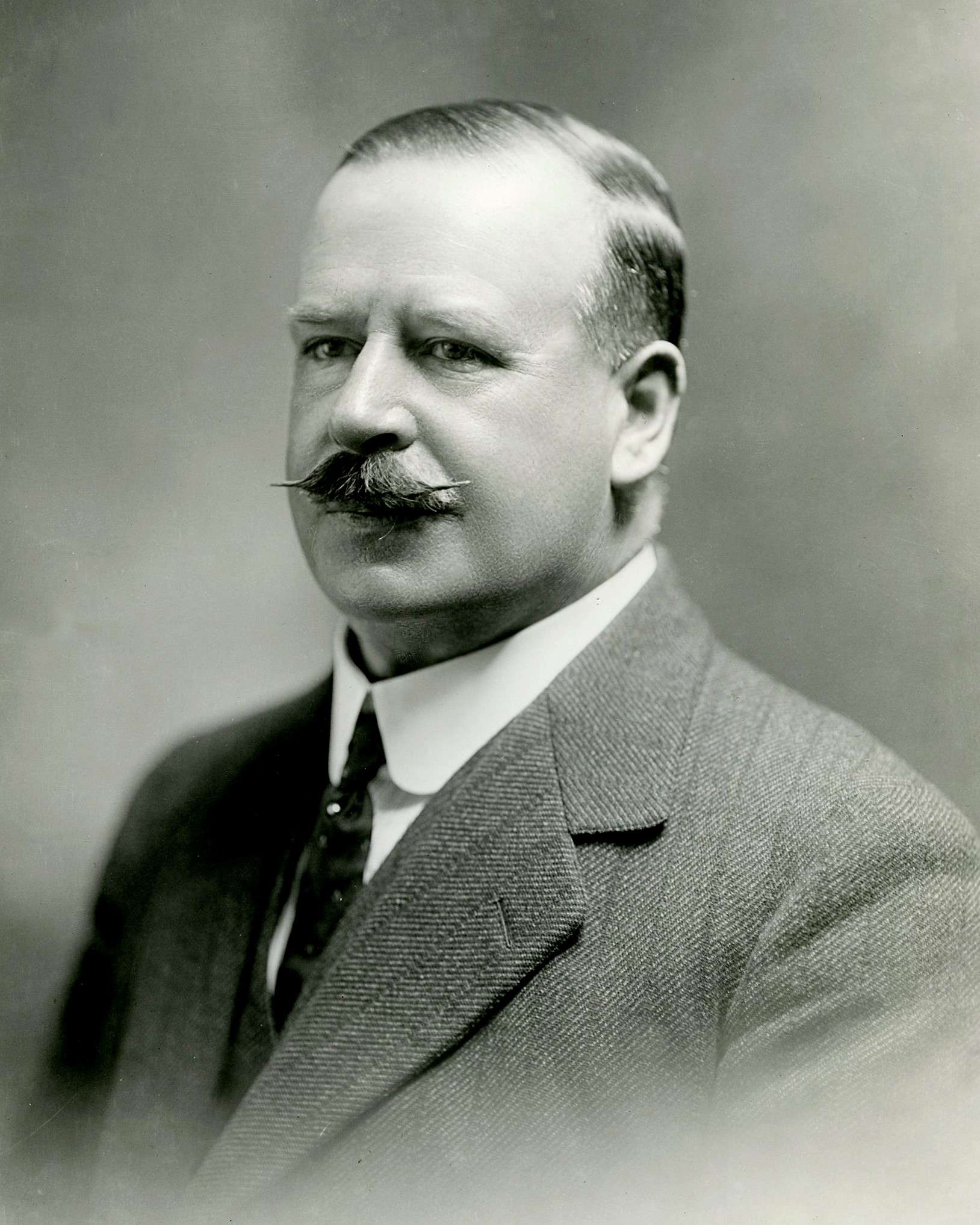
Joseph Ward, who with William Massey was aboard Rotorua when she used the Panama Canal in 1916 for the first time

In September or October 1916 Rotorua used the Panama Canal for the first time. She was en route to London, and her passengers included New Zealand Prime Minister William Massey and his Minister of Finance Joseph Ward. Ward was impressed with the canal's economic potential for New Zealand, and predicted "It is going to be a greater highway for commerce than the Suez Canal".

On 24 December 1916 the Union Steamship Company liner Maitai ran aground on a reef off Rarotonga. She was carrying 43 passengers and 900 tons of cargo, including more than 1,400 bags of mail bound for New Zealand. Much of the mail was from troops serving overseas. Rotorua was diverted to assist. She reached Rarotonga on 31 December, embarked Maitai's passengers and loaded her mails.

Rotorua had been bound for Wellington, but with Maitai's mails and passengers she diverted to Auckland, where she arrived on the evening of 8 January. Rotorua's passengers again included wounded soldiers being repatriated from France.

On 19–20 January Rotorua was in Port Chalmers when two of her stokers went absent without leave, went to Dunedin and enlisted in the armed forces under false names. The pair were caught, and on 22 January pleaded guilty at Dunedin Police Court.

== Loss and wreck ==
Position in Lyme Bay where SM UC-17 sank Rotorua

On 3 February Rotorua left Wellington with a full cargo of frozen food and other produce. She called at Newport News, Virginia and in March she reached Plymouth, where her 264 passengers disembarked. She then left Plymouth for London, but on 22 March 1917 SM UC-17 sank her by torpedo in Lyme Bay about 24 nautical miles (44 km) east of Start Point, Devon. As the crew were abandoning ship one of her stewards fell overboard. He was the only fatality.

In her short career of seven years Rotorua had completed 13 round trips between England and New Zealand. Her loss was a double blow for the NZ Shipping Co, as on 10 March the German merchant raider SMS Möwe had sunk Otaki in a gun battle. Five of Otaki's crew had been killed, and the survivors were captured as prisoners of war.

Rotorua's wreck lies with a list to port at a depth of 144 to 213 feet (44 to 65 m). She is now a recreational dive site for wreck diving. Divers have recovered her bell.

== Bibliography ==
- The Marconi Press Agency Ltd (1914). The Year Book of Wireless Telegraphy and Telephony. London: The Marconi Press Agency Ltd.
- Waters, Sydney D (1939). Clipper Ship to Motor Liner; the story of the New Zealand Shipping Company 1873–1939. London: The New Zealand Shipping Company Ltd.
