= SS Clan Mactavish =

UK refrigerated cargo ship sunk in WW1

History

United Kingdom
- Name: Clan Mactavish
- Namesake: Clan MacTavish
- Owner: February 1913: The Clan Line Steamers; May 1913: Charles W Cayzer, James Mackenzie, David Rennie; March 1915: The Clan Line Steamers
- Operator: Cayzer, Irvine & Co, Ltd
- Port of registry: Glasgow
- Builder: Armstrong Whitworth, Low Walker
- Cost: £92,500
- Yard number: 847
- Launched: 9 December 1912
- Completed: 27 February 1913
- Maiden voyage: Australia via Barrow and Glasgow
- Identification: UK official number 133100; code letters JBHQ
- Fate: shelled and scuttled, 16 January 1916

General characteristics
- Type: refrigerated cargo ship
- Tonnage: 7,385 GRT, 4,693 NRT, 8,850 DWT
- Length: 450.1 ft (137.2 m)
- Beam: 57.1 ft (17.4 m)
- Depth: 26.8 ft (8.2 m)
- Decks: 2
- Installed power: 1 × triple expansion engine, 4,500 ihp, 571 NHP
- Propulsion: 1 × screw
- Speed: 14 1/2 knots (27 km/h) maximum on trial; 12 knots (22 km/h) cruising
- Capacity: 127,660 cubic feet (3,615 m^{3}) refrigerated
- Armament: by December 1915: 1 × naval gun
- Notes: sister ship: Clan Macarthur

SS Clan Mactavish was a UK refrigerated cargo steamship that was sunk in the First World War. She was built in Newcastle upon Tyne, launched in 1912, and completed in 1913. When new, she and her sister ship Clan Macarthur were the two largest ships in the Clan Line fleet. The German commerce raider SMS Möwe sank Clan Mactavish in the Atlantic Ocean in 1916, killing 18 members of her crew.

She was the first of three Clan Line ships to be named after Clan MacTavish, a Scottish clan from Argyll. The second and third were turbine steamships launched in 1920 and 1949 respectively.

== Clan Line's Australian trade ==
In 1906, McArthur Shipping & Agency Co, Ltd invited Clan Line to start trading between Australia and the UK. The service began late that year with the newly-built Clan Matheson. Cargoes carried from Australia included wool and wheat. This Clan Line service tended to include sailing in ballast from Cape Colony to Australia, which contributed to the voyages being not very profitable. Charles Cayzer, Clan Line's Chairman, was reluctant to continue the service, but his sons, including August and Herbert, saw potential in it, and prevailed over their father. Clan Line extended the service to New Zealand in 1908, and by 1911 freight rates had improved enough for the company to resume ordering new ships, after a lull of four years.

Between 1911 and 1913, Clan Line took delivery of a class of nine flush deck cargo ships, each 430 ft (130 m) long, 53.5 ft (16.3 m) beam, and just over 5,000 GRT. Clan Macnaughton, launched in June 1911, was a member of this class.

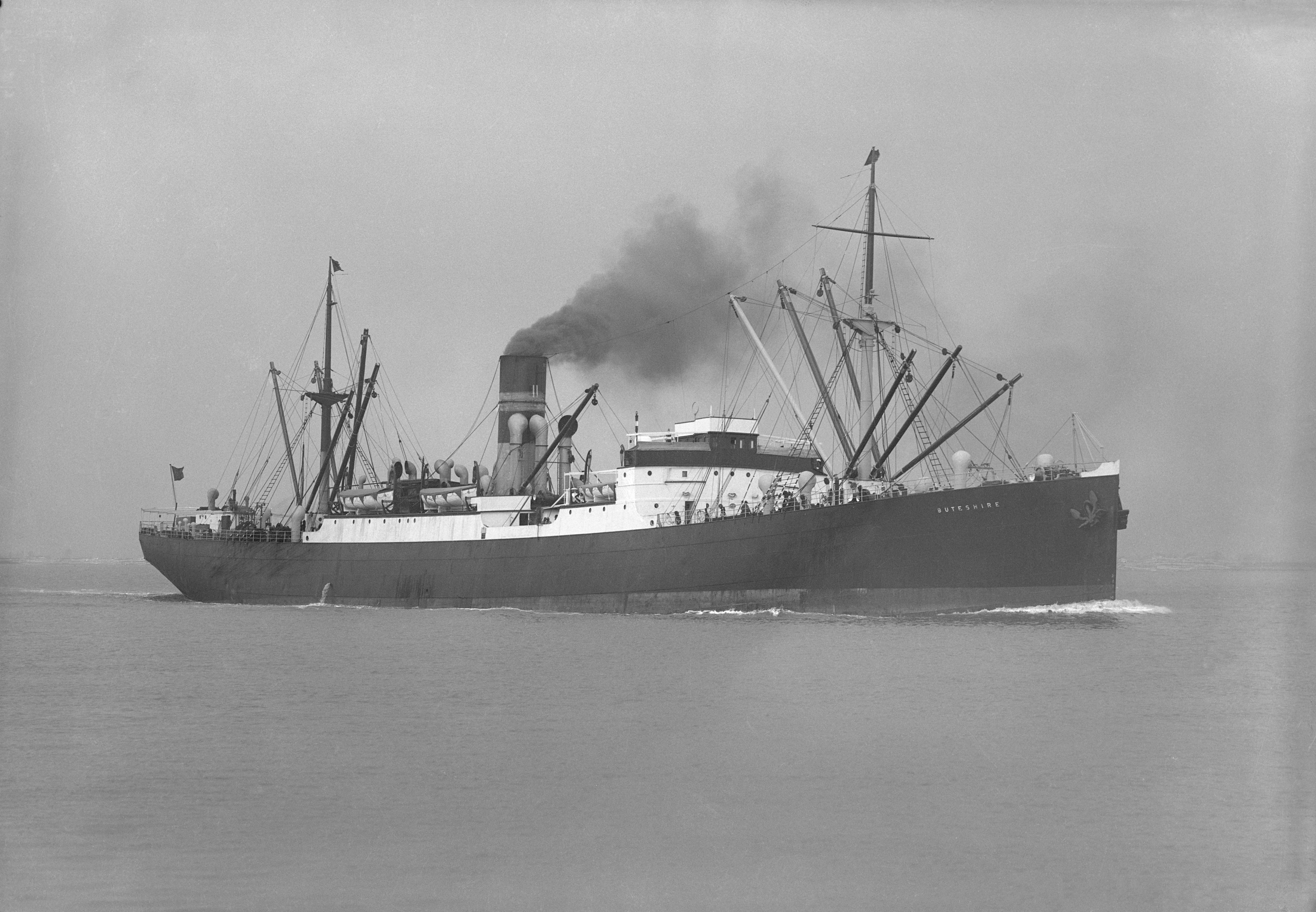
Clan Macewen, one of Clan Line's first set of refrigerated cargo ships. This photograph was taken after she had been transferred to Scottish Shire Line in 1920, and renamed Buteshire.

Three other members of this class had refrigerated cargo holds, and they were Clan Line's first ever refrigerated ships. J & E Hall, Ltd, of Dartford, made their refrigerating equipment, using "silicate cotton" (mineral wool) as insulation, brine and air as coolants, and compressed "carbonic anhydride" (carbon dioxide). The first was Clan Macrae, launched in November 1911. She was joined by Clan Davidson, launched in December 1911, and Clan Macewen, launched in March 1912. The trio enabled Clan Line to broaden its trade with the southern hemisphere, adding cargoes of meat, dairy products, and apples from Tasmania and New Zealand.

== Ordering larger refrigerated cargo ships ==
In 1912, Clan Line ordered a pair of larger refrigerated cargo ships for its growing Australian trade. They looked similar to the class of 430-foot ships, with a flush deck and long central superstructure, but they were 20 ft (6 m) longer, their beam was 3.6 ft (1 m) greater, and their refrigerated cargo capacity was about one third greater. Again, J & E Hall made the refrigerating equipment, but the design was revised to use granulated cork as the insulating material, instead of silicate cotton.

Another design difference was that instead of having two main boilers and one auxiliary boiler, the pair of larger ships had three main boilers and no auxiliary. At sea, any two boilers could provide steam for the main engine plus any other equipment; while the third could be serviced. In port, any one boiler could provide steam for refrigeration, electricity generation, and winches; while the other two could be serviced. The boilers' working pressure was 220 psi.

Clan Line invited tenders from a number of different shipbuilders. William Doxford & Sons of Sunderland, who had built Clan Macrae, Clan Davidson, and Clan Mackenzie – one of the non-refrigerated members of the 430-foot class – tendered £104,000 each. Palmers Shipbuilding and Iron Company, on the River Tyne, who had built Clan Macewen, tendered £97,000 each. But Armstrong Whitworth & Co, who had built Clan MacGillivray – another of the non-refrigerated members of the same class – tendered £92,500, and won the contract.

== Building Clan Macarthur and Clan Mactavish ==
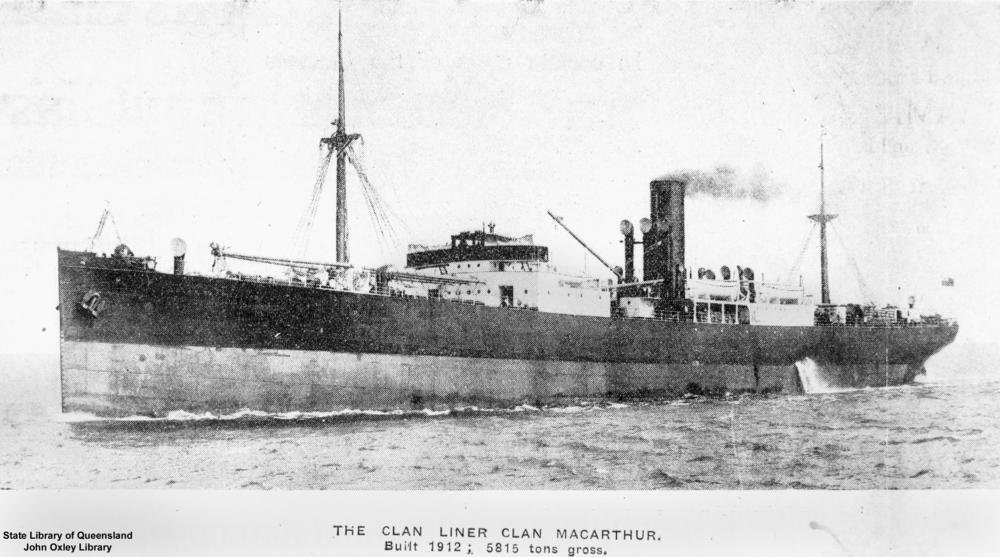
Clan Macarthur, sister ship of Clan Mactavish

Armstrong Whitworth built the two large reefer ships at its Low Walker shipyard on the Tyne, as yard numbers 846 and 847. Yard number 846 was launched on 26 September 1912 as Clan Macarthur, apparently alluding to Clan Line's trade with McArthur Shipping & Agency. Yard number 847 was launched on 9 December that year as Clan Mactavish.

Clan Mactavish's registered length was 450.1 ft (137.2 m), her beam was 57.1 ft (17.4 m), and her depth was 26.8 ft (8.2 m). Her tonnages were 7,385 GRT, 4,693 NRT, and 8,850 DWT, and the capacity of her refrigerated holds was 127,660 cubic feet (3,615 m^{3}). She had a single screw, driven by a three-cylinder triple expansion engine built by the Wallsend Slipway & Engineering Company. It was rated at 571 NHP or 4,500 ihp, and gave her a cruising speed of 12 knots (22 km/h).

On 19 February 1913, Clan Line registered Clan Mactavish at Glasgow. Her official number was 133100, and her code letters were JBHQ. On 27 February, she made her sea trials in the North Sea off the River Tyne, achieving a top speed of 14 1/2 knots (27 km/h). Her builders handed her over to Clan Line the same day.

Clan Mactavish's maiden voyage was to Australia, via Barrow-in-Furness and Glasgow. By June 1914, she was equipped with wireless telegraphy, and her Master was a Captain William N Oliver.

== Loss ==
Late in 1915, Clan Mactavish loaded a cargo in Australia that included wool, gum, leather, and other goods, with a total value of about £500,000. On 9 December, she left Fremantle in Western Australia. On 12 January 1916 she called at Dakar in the French colony of Senegal. She then continued her voyage toward the UK.

On the night of 16 January, Clan Mactavish was 120 nautical miles (220 km) south by west of Madeira, when another cargo ship steaming in the same direction approached Clan Mactavish, and addressed her by signal lamp: "What is the name of your ship?" Clan Mactavish cautiously replied "Tell us your name first". The stranger replied "Author", which was the name of a UK Harrison Line cargo ship. Clan Mactavish replied by stating her name. The stranger then cleared for action, trained her guns on Clan Mactavish, and replied "German cruiser here. Stop immediately." Clan Mactavish replied "We have stopped."

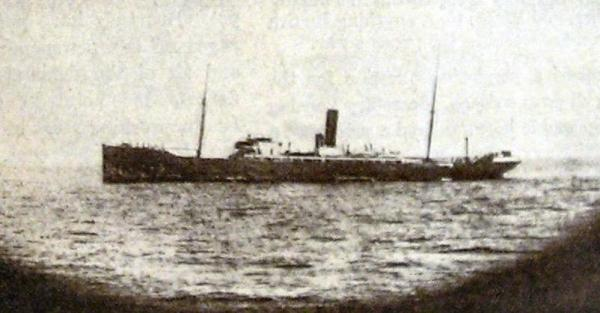
SMS Möwe in January 1916, seen from Elder, Dempster's passenger liner Appam

The stranger was in fact SMS Möwe, the first of a new type of German merchant raider. In the first few months of the war, the Imperial German Navy had used converted ocean liners as commerce raiders. Möwe, by contrast, was a converted banana boat. She had left Germany in December 1915; started capturing and sinking UK merchant ships on 11 January; and had in fact sunk the real Author on 13 January.

Clan Mactavish's third officer, Michael MacIntyre, was on watch on the bridge when Möwe addressed her by signal lamp. MacIntyre's reply "We have stopped" was a bluff, while in fact Captain Oliver telegraphed the engine room for "full ahead". Möwe also believed that the reefer ship was broadcasting a wireless telegraph distress signal, in the hope of alerting any Royal Navy ship that might be nearby. Möwe opened fire in a broadside with her single 150 mm gun, and two of her four 105 mm guns. Clan Mactavish had only one gun, mounted on her poop, and only two Royal Navy gunners, but she returned fire. In the darkness, the reefer's gun layer misjudged his aim, so Clan Mactavish fired her shells slightly too high, and missed Möwe.

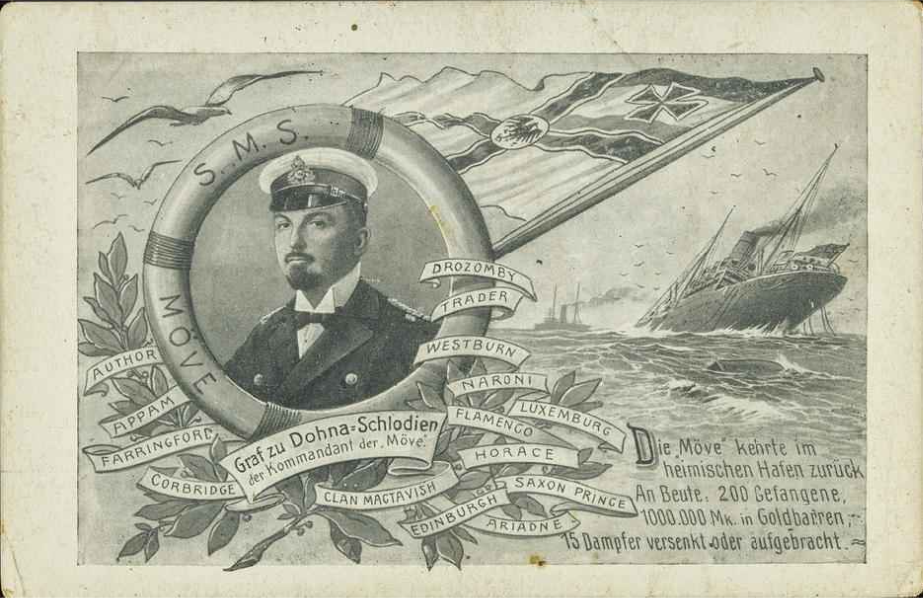
German postcard published in 1916, celebrating SMS Möwe's first raiding voyage, and listing ships sunk or captured, including Clan Mactavish

The range between the two ships was only 450 yards (410 m) when Möwe opened fire, and she closed on Clan Mactavish to reduce the range to 330 yards (300 m). However, according to MacIntyre, most of the German shells also missed. The first hit was on Clan Mactavish's fo'c'sle, where it smashed a windlass and killed a lascar look-out man. The second hit destroyed the cabins of her second officer and chief steward. The third hit was on the upper part of her engine room, which killed 17 lascars and wounded another five. The fourth hit was aft, holing her hull below the waterline in her number 5 hold.

Captain Oliver ordered Clan Mactavish's gun to cease fire, ordered the engine room to stop her engine, and told Möwe by signal lamp: "We have stopped altogether". However, the gunners on Clan Mactavish's poop fired one more shot before Captain Oliver's order reached them from the bridge. Clan Mactavish's cargo was valuable, but with her main engine wrecked and her hull holed, she was an impractical prospect as a prize ship. The Germans took her crew prisoner, and Möwe sank the reefer by gunfire.

== Survivors ==
Appam, still flying a German naval ensign, after reaching Hampton Roads in February 1916

About 8 to 10 nautical miles (15 to 19 km) from the battle was Appam, an Elder, Demspter passenger liner that Möwe had captured the day before, and was now under a German prize crew. Four or five wounded members of Clan Mactavish's crew, including three lascars, were transferred to Appam, which the prize crew then took across the North Atlantic to the then-neutral US. On 1 February she entered Hampton Roads, landed her prisoners at Newport News, and the wounded were hospitalised.

On 8 February, Möwe captured the UK cargo ship Westburn, put a prize crew aboard her, and transferred to her 206 prisoners from seven sunk or captured ships, including 18 survivors from Clan Mactavish. The prize crew took her to the neutral Canary Islands, where she arrived in Santa Cruz de Tenerife on 22 February. From there the freed prisoners, including third officer MacIntyre, boarded a ship that landed them at Tilbury in England on 4 March. Clan Mactavish's Master and two Royal Navy gunners were kept as prisoners aboard Möwe, which landed them in Germany, also on 4 March. They were held in Germany until 1918.

== Resisting Möwe ==
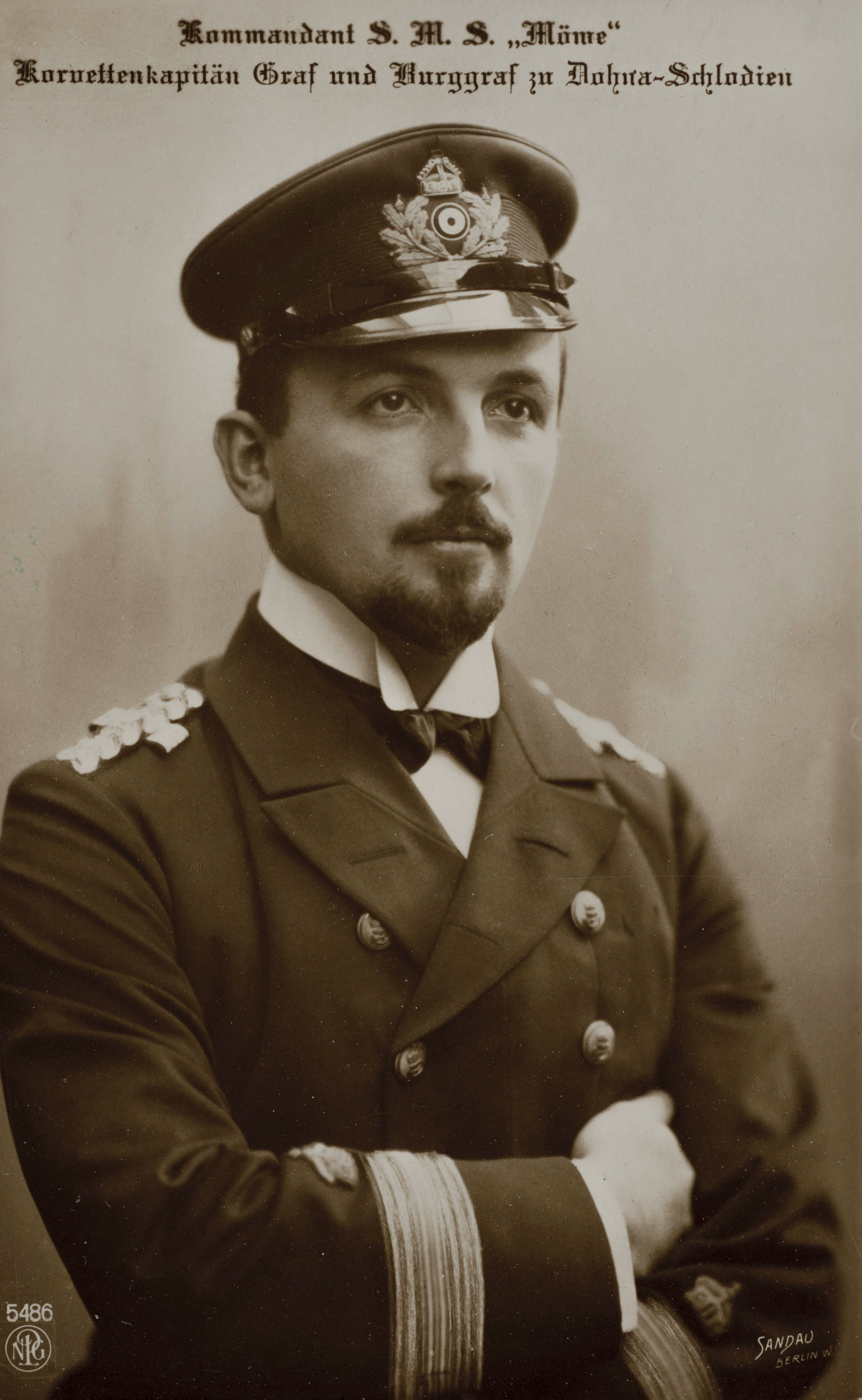
Fregattenkapitän Nikolaus zu Dohna-Schlodien in 1916

Möwe intercepted 15 merchant ships on her first voyage, sank 13 of them, and sent the remaining two to neutral ports as prizes. Clan Mactavish was the eighth ship that Möwe captured, and the first and only one that tried to resist during that voyage. Möwe made a second voyage a year later, in which she intercepted another 25 ships. Only two of those, the New Zealand Shipping Company's Otaki and Harrison Line's Governor, tried to resist, and Möwe defeated and sank both of them, too.

After Clan Mactavish surrendered, Möwe's commanding officer, Fregattenkapitän Nikolaus zu Dohna-Schlodien, met Captain Oliver, and asked why he resisted being captured. Oliver replied "I wanted to get away, of course, and I fired to protect my ship. My Government put a gun aboard, and I used it. It wasn't put there for ornament." Dohna-Schlodien is reported to have replied that he would probably have done the same, and shook Captain Oliver's hand.

Captain Oliver was repatriated from Germany in October 1918. Before the Armistice of 11 November 1918, he was awarded the Distinguished Service Cross "in recognition of zeal and devotion to duty shown in carrying on the trade of the country during the War."

== Bibliography ==
- Chatterton, E Keble (1932). The Sea Raiders. London: Hurst and Blackett.
- Clarkson, John; Fenton, Roy; Munro, Archie (2007). Clan Line Illustrated Fleet History. Preston: Ships in Focus Publications. ISBN 978-1-901703-47-4.
- Haws, Duncan (1997). Clan, Houston, Turnbull Martin & Scottish Tankers. Merchant Fleets. Vol. 33. Pembroke: TCL Publications. ISBN 978-0946378333.
- Lloyd's Register of Shipping. Vol. I.–Sailing Vessels, Owners, &c. London: Lloyd's Register of Shipping. 1914 – via Internet Archive.
- Lloyd's Register of Shipping. Vol. II.–Steamers. London: Lloyd's Register of Shipping. 1914 – via Internet Archive.
- Mercantile Navy List. London: Registrar General of Shipping and Seamen. 1914 – via Crew List Index Project.
