= Archibald Bisset Smith =

Scottish recipient of the Victoria Cross

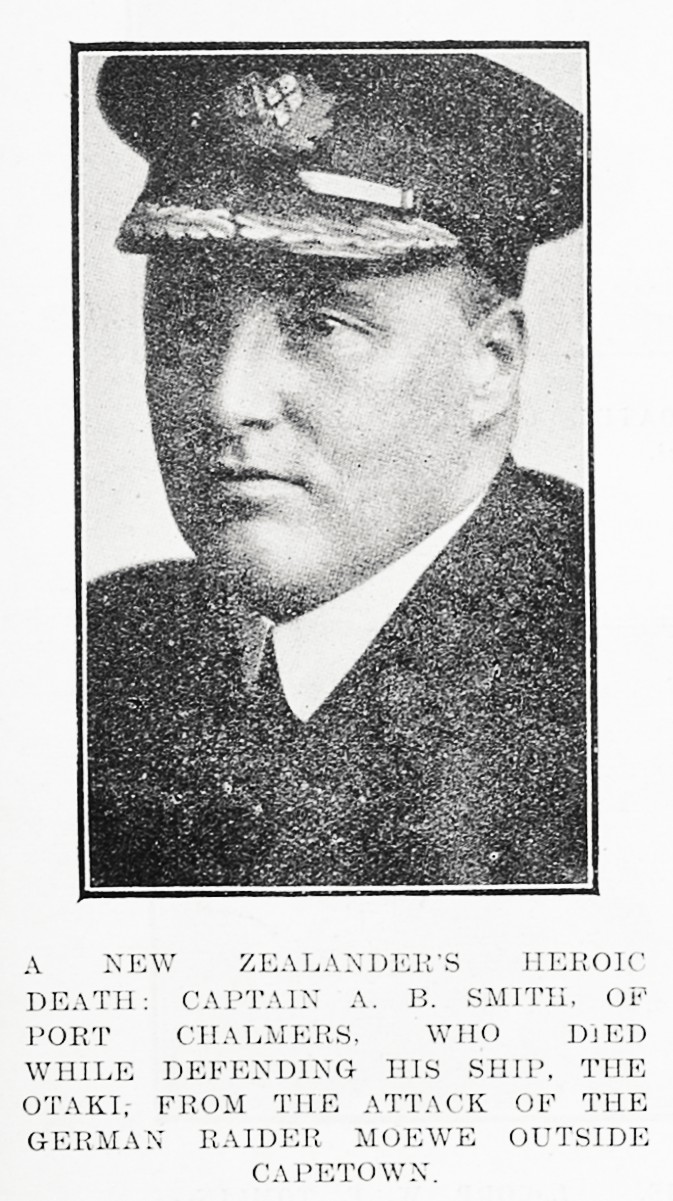
- portrait published in the Auckland Weekly News on 12 April 1917
- Born: 19 December 1878; Cults, Aberdeenshire
- Died: 10 March 1917 (aged 38); Atlantic Ocean
- Military career
- Allegiance: United Kingdom
- Branch: (United Kingdom) Royal Naval Reserve (United Kingdom) Merchant Navy
- Rank: Merchant Navy: Master; Royal Navy: Lieutenant
- Units: Royal Naval Reserve
- Commands: Otaki
- Conflicts: World War I: Action of 10 March 1917 †
- Awards: Victoria Cross

Archibald Bisset Smith VC (19 December 1878 – 10 March 1917) was a Scottish recipient of the Victoria Cross, the highest and most prestigious award for gallantry in the face of the enemy that can be awarded to British and Commonwealth forces.

Smith is one of only two members of the UK Merchant Navy to have been awarded the VC for his First World War service.

== World War I action and Victoria Cross ==
Smith received this award for his action as Master of the New Zealand Shipping Company cargo ship Otaki. On 10 March 1917 in the Atlantic Ocean, Otaki, armed with one 4.7-inch gun, sighted the German merchant raider SMS Möwe, which was armed with four 150 mm, one 105 mm guns and two 500 mm torpedo launchers.

The raider ordered Otaki to stop but Captain Smith refused. A duel ensued, during which Otaki secured a number of hits and caused Möwe considerable damage, but Otaki sustained much damage and was on fire. Captain Smith therefore ordered his crew to abandon ship, but he himself stayed aboard and went down with his ship.

His citation reads:

For most conspicuous gallantry and devotion to duty when in command of the S.S. "Otaki", on the 10th March 1917. "At about 2.30 p.m. on 10th March 1917, the S.S."Otaki", whose armament consisted of one 4.7 in. gun for defensive purposes sighted the disguised German raider "Möwe", which was armed with four 5.9 in., one 4.1 in. and two 22 pdr. guns, and two torpedo tubes. The "Möwe" kept the "Otaki" under observation for some time and finally called upon her to stop. This Lieutenant Smith refused to do, and a duel ensued at ranges of 1,900–2,000 yards and lasted for about 20 minutes. During this action the "Otaki" scored several hits on the "Möwe", causing considerable damage, and starting a fire which lasted for three days. She sustained several casualties and received much damage herself, and was heavily on fire. Lieutenant Smith, therefore, gave orders for the boats to be lowered to allow the crew to be rescued. He remained on the ship himself and went down with her when she sank with the British colours still flying, after what was described in an enemy account as "a duel as gallant as naval history can relate."

As a Merchant officer, Smith could not receive the VC at that time. In 1919 he was posthumously commissioned as a temporary lieutenant in the Royal Naval Reserve, which entitled him to receive the VC posthumously.

As a British Merchant seafarer with no known grave, Smith is commemorated on the Tower Hill Memorial. On 10 March 2017 a memorial stone was laid at Schoolhill, Aberdeen, to commemorate the centenary of his action.

His VC is preserved at the P&O Heritage Collection in London.

== Personal life ==
Smith was born at Cosie Brae in Cults on 19 December 1878, one of five children of William Smith, an accountant and wholesale merchant, and Annie Smith (née Nicol), both originally from Rhynie. William Smith was a descendant of Bold Peter Smith, a Jacobite killed at the Battle of Culloden.

Archibald was a student at Robert Gordon's College before joining the Merchant Navy in 1895. He gained his Master's ticket in 1903 while serving with the New Zealand Shipping Company, and served on the steamers Waikato, Rakaia, Waimate and Turakina.

Shortly before World War I, Smith married Edith Clulee (née Powell), whom he had met while working in Port Chalmers, New Zealand. She had a son, Alfred, from a previous marriage. Alfred later took his stepfather's surname.

== Legacy ==
In November 1917 Smith was awarded a posthumous commendation. After the armistice of 11 November 1918 more details of the battle reached the UK authorities. Möwe's captain, Nikolaus zu Dohna-Schlodien, described Otaki's resistance as "a duel as gallant as naval history can relate". In May 1919 Smith was posthumously awarded the Victoria Cross.

King George V presented Smith's VC to Edith and Alfred at Buckingham Palace. After Edith's death in 1951, Alfred sold the VC and Archibald's other medals (the British War Medal, Victory Medal, and Mercantile Marine Medal) to the New Zealand Shipping Company for £ 125.

In 1937 his family presented the Otaki Shield to Robert Gordon's College, to be an annual award to the senior boy who is judged "pre-eminent in character, in leadership and in athletics". The shield is accompanied by the prize of six weeks in New Zealand as Otaki Scholar, visiting various schools as a "roving ambassador" for the college.

== Bibliography ==
- Buzzell, Nora, ed. (1997). The Register of the Victoria Cross. This England. ISBN 0-906324-27-0.
- Gröner, Erich (1985). Die deutschen Kriegsschiffe 1815–1945 (in German). Vol. 3: U-Boote, Hilfskreuzer, Minenschiffe, Netzleger, Sperrbrecher. Koblenz: Bernard & Graefe Verlag. p. 154. ISBN 978-3-7637-4802-0.
- Harvey, David (1999). Monuments to Courage: Victoria Cross Headstones and Memorials. Vol. 2, 1917–1982. Kevin & Kay Patience. OCLC 59437300.
- Ross, Graham (1995). Scotland's Forgotten Valour. MacLean Press. ISBN 1-899272-00-3.
- Snelling, Stephen (2002). VCs of the First World War – The Naval VCs. VCs of the First World War. Stroud: The History Press. ISBN 978-0-7524-8733-5.
- Waters, Sydney D (1939). Clipper Ship to Motor Liner; the story of the New Zealand Shipping Company 1873–1939. London: The New Zealand Shipping Company Ltd. pp. 74–78.
