= Defensively equipped merchant ship =

British Admiralty Trade Division programme established in June 1939

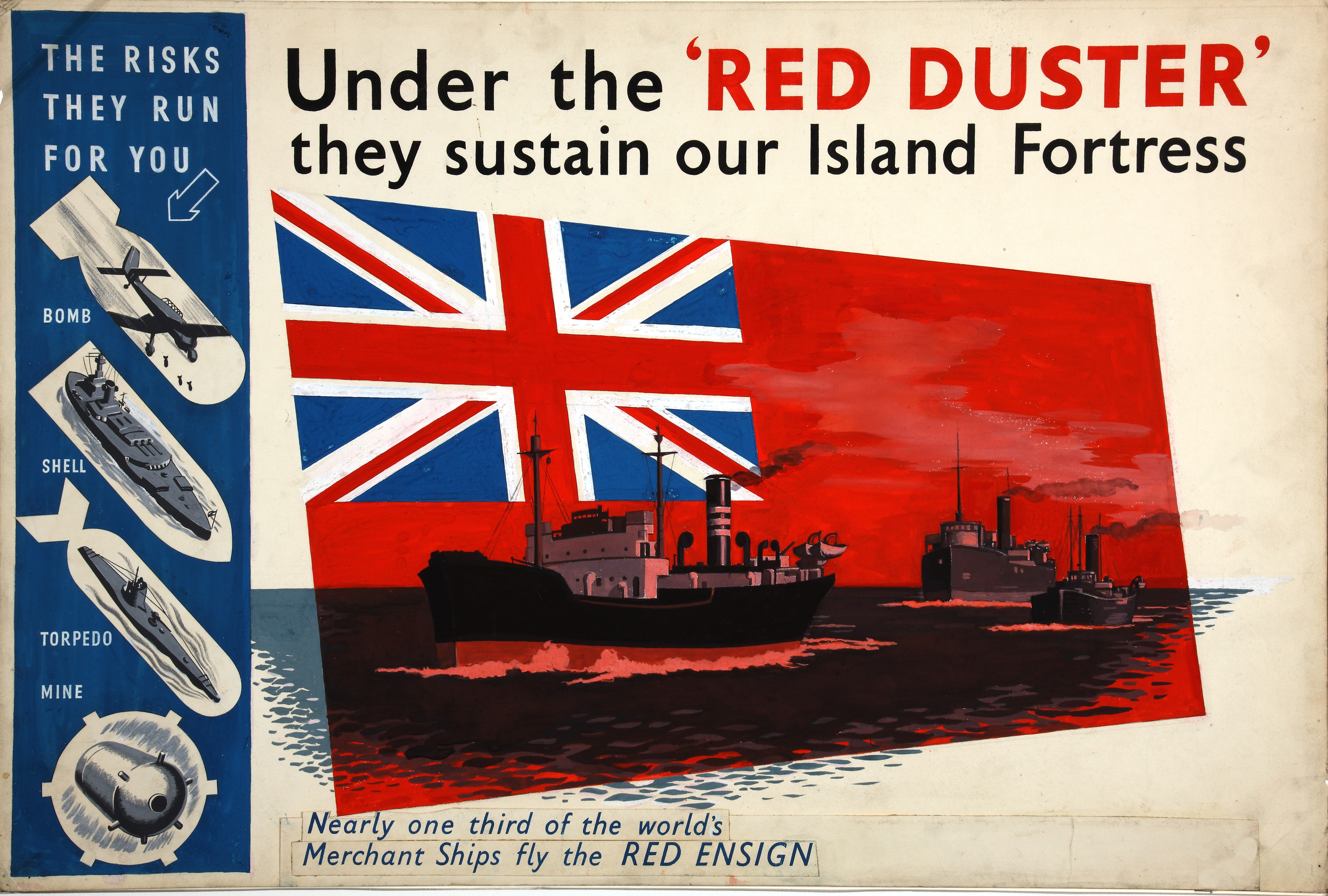

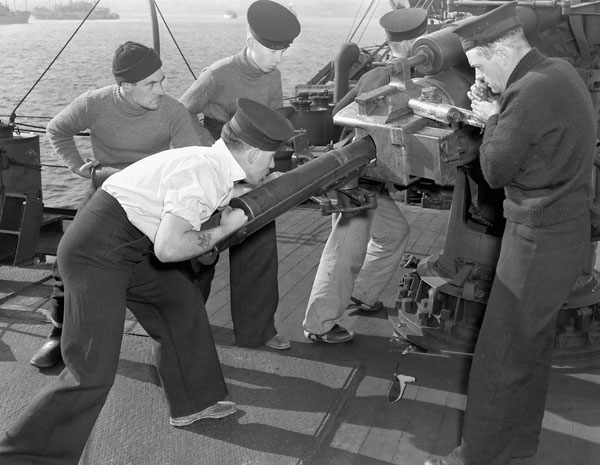
The gun crew of a defensively equipped merchant ship during a drill at Halifax, Nova Scotia, in 1942. A merchant seaman (in knit cap) is ready to pass a shell to the Royal Navy gunners.

Defensively equipped merchant ship (DEMS) was an Admiralty Trade Division programme established in June 1939, to arm 5,500 British merchant ships with an adequate defence against enemy submarines and aircraft. The acronym DEMS was used to describe the ships carrying the guns, the guns aboard the ships, the military personnel manning the guns, and the shore establishment supporting the system. This followed a similar World War I program of defensively armed merchant ships (DAMS).

The program was distinct from armed merchant cruiser program, which were warships converted from civilian vessels, operated by the Royal Navy itself.

== Background ==
In the eighteenth and nineteenth centuries, European countries such as Spain, France, the Netherlands and Britain armed their merchant ships to prevent capture by pirates, enemy commerce raiders and privateers when they conducted overseas trade. The most heavily armed were ships carrying valuable cargo back from the Far East. Notably the East Indiamen class of ships were constructed from the keel up with defence in mind, with their heavy armament making some of the most powerful examples equivalent to naval Fourth-rate ships of the line. After the end of the Napoleonic Wars in 1815, these were replaced for some of the balance of the 19th century with faster and lighter unarmed ships such as clippers that, in theory, could outrun any threat when blockade running or carrying smaller quantities of the most valuable cargoes long distance.

== Prewar preparations ==
From the turn of the 20th century, growing tensions between Europe's Great Powers included an Anglo-German naval arms race that threatened the security of merchant shipping. In December 1911 a memo from Winston Churchill, recently appointed as First Lord of the Admiralty, proposed that the utility or otherwise of arming British merchant ships "for their own defence" be ascertained. The Admiralty created a Committee on the Arming of British Merchant Vessels under Captain Alexander Duff, that reported in May 1912. In October 1912 Admiral Sir Francis Bridgeman became Churchill's First Sea Lord, and that October Bridgeman warned the Committee of Imperial Defence that "the Germans were arming their merchant ships, nominally for the protection of their own trade, but more probably in order to attack ours." The ships being armed by the Kaiserliche Marine were passenger liners that were fast enough to serve as auxiliary cruisers, and they would indeed be used as raiders in WWI, though there were not as many as the British expected.

The British Admiralty intended to have armed merchant cruisers of its own through the potential wartime conversion of vessels such as the RMS Lusitania and RMS Mauretania to outright warships. A second plan was to experiment with having civilian ships armed for their own protection, starting with the Royal Mail Steam Packet Company passenger liner RMS Aragon. She was due to carry naval guns from December 1912, but within the British Government and Admiralty there was uncertainty as to how foreign countries and ports would react. Many merchant ships had been armed in the 18th century and it had never been made illegal, but Britain feared that foreign authorities might refuse to let armed British merchant ships enter port, or might intern them. In January 1913 Rear Admiral Henry Campbell recommended that the Admiralty should send a merchant ship to sea with naval guns, but without ammunition, to test foreign governments' reaction. A meeting chaired by Sir Francis Hopwood, Civil Lord of the Admiralty agreed to put guns without ammunition on a number of merchant ships "and see what happens." Sir Eyre Crowe was at the meeting and recorded "If nothing happens, it may be possible and easy, after a time, to place ammunition on board." To emphasize the defensive nature of the guns, they were to be mounted aft, so that they could be used only while making an escape.

In March the policy was made public, and in April it was implemented. On 25 April 1913 Aragon left Southampton carrying two QF 4.7-inch (120 mm) naval guns on her stern. The Admiralty planned to arm Houlder Brothers' La Correntina similarly if the reaction were favourable. Governments, newspapers and the public in South American countries that Aragon visited took little notice and expressed no concern.

There was more criticism in Britain, where Commander Barry Domvile, Secretary to the Committee of Imperial Defence, warned that the policy undermined Britain's objection to the arming of German merchant ships. Domvile predicted that arming merchant ships would be ineffective, and would lead only to a second maritime arms race alongside the naval one. Gerard Noel, a former Admiral of the Fleet, told Churchill that were a merchant ship ever to fire its guns it could be accused of piracy. Churchill replied by drawing a distinction between merchant ships armed as auxiliary cruisers and those armed only for self-defence.

Privately Churchill was more concerned, and in June 1913 he directed Admiralty staff to "do everything in our power to reconcile this new departure with the principles of international law". However, the policy continued. Aragon's sister ship RMS Amazon was made the next DAMS, and in the following months further RMSP "A-liners" were armed. They included the newly built Alcantara, that in the First World War did indeed serve as an armed merchant cruiser.

== World War I ==
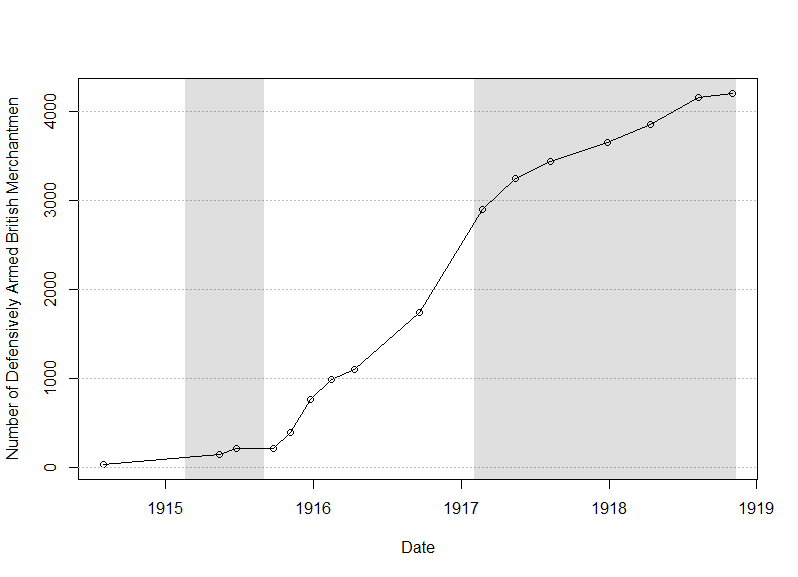
Graph showing the increasing numbers of British defensively armed merchant ships. Shaded areas are periods of unrestricted submarine warfare.

In the First World War, the UK blockaded Germany, while Germany in turn attempted to blockade the UK with submarines. After the British intensified the blockade with a North Sea "military area" declaration in November 1914, on 4 February 1915 Admiral Hugo von Pohl published a notice declaring a "war zone" in all waters around the United Kingdom of Great Britain and Ireland. The "war zone" had a different meaning to the British military area: within that zone, Germany was to conduct unrestricted submarine warfare against merchant ships from 18 February 1915, without warning and without regard to safety of their crew.

U-boats could attack from underwater without warning, or attack on the surface, typically with warning. The latter method was how the first merchant ship lost to U-boats was sunk: This, the Glitra, was an 866-ton British steamer outbound from Grangemouth to Stavanger with a cargo of coal, iron plate, and oil. She was stopped by the German submarine U-17 on 20 October 1914; and a boarding party gave Glitra's crew time to disembark into lifeboats before sinking the ship by opening valves to flood holds with seawater. The procedure followed customs originated by surface ships. International maritime law required the naval vessel to make adequate provisions for the safety of the merchant crew and passengers before sinking their ship.

The two procedures for sinking merchant ships were compared in 1915. Merchant ships escaped 42% of torpedo attacks made without warning, in comparison to 54% escaping from conventional surface attempts to stop the ship. However submarines can carry much more ammunition for the deck gun and thus can sink more ships. For that reason, despite pressure from naval authorities and public declarations of intent to attack with warning, crews preferred otherwise, sinking the majority of ships on the surface in accordance with cruiser rules up until the end of 1916. Thus, armaments on merchant ships were useful: they aided escape, even if only a minimal number of submarines were sunk by gunfire from these vessels.

Of the over 12,000 steam ships Britain had at the start of the war, only around 40 were armed. While the February 1915 German declaration created an impetus to arm ships, there was a shortage of suitable weapons and ammunition, resulting in a diverse array of guns being used, with often only single small obsolete weapons like the 47mm QF 3-pounder Hotchkiss being used. Such guns were much inferior, in particular in range, to the 88 and 105mm deck guns mounted on submarines. Nevertheless, the guns were mounted on the stern of vessels, transferred from one ship to another to ensure maximum use, and civilian captains were encouraged to flee while shooting back. 149 civilian ships had been so armed on May 14 1915, 219 by September 24, 766 by December 25, rising to 1,749 by September 1916 and 2,899 by February 1917. The effect of this was that about half of ships attacked in 1916 (with U-boat attacks occurring mainly in the latter part of that year) had defensive armament and were sunk at much lower rates. When guns were not available, fake guns were sometimes used to deter attack. The ships created problems with neutrals, so in late 1915 the Admiralty issued orders that ships equipped with defensive guns must not do anything to disguise themselves or the presence of the weapons, until 1917 when the German Admiralty announced that defensively armed ships would be sunk without warning on sight.

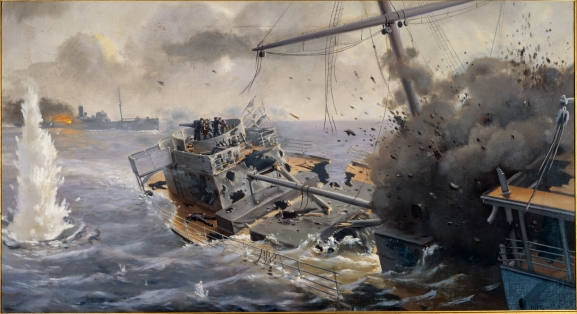
The Otaki in combat with the German raider SMS Möwe, using her 4.7 inch gun. Defensive armaments also offered protection against merchant raiders.

While submarines were still scoring a high number of kills on the surface, the rising number of armed merchant ships was cited as a factor (alongside the more major point that they anticipated a swift victory by starving Britain) in the German Admiralty Staff's December 1916 Holtzendorff Memorandum, leading to a second campaign of unrestricted submarine warfare. The United States responded to unrestricted submarine warfare by severing diplomatic relations with Germany on 3 February 1917. A filibuster in the United States Senate temporarily delayed President Woodrow Wilson's proposal on 26 February 1917 to arm United States merchant ships, but arming started in March under an executive order.

Later in 1917, guns for merchant ships became more available, and the British continued to arm ships with heavier guns even as the number of surface attacks reduced. The 76mm 12 pounders were to be used as a minimum, and 4.7-inch guns preferred. Around 3000 additional guns were mounted in 1917. Guns had been manned mostly by Royal Marines at this point, but now the Navy had to provide a two-week course on combating the "Submarine Menace" to ship masters. By November 1918, 4,203 vessels were armed, the vast majority of ships operating in the danger area. Guns were removed at the end of the war.

== World War II ==
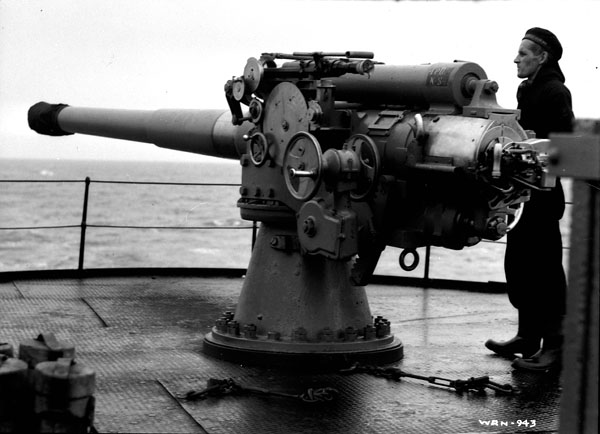
BL 4-inch Mk VII low-angle gun on a DEMS in 1943, an obsolete WWI gun typical of WWII DEMS armament

Old naval guns had been stored since 1918 in ports for possible use. In the Second World War the objective was to equip each ship with a low-angle gun mounted aft as defence against surfaced submarines and a high-angle gun and rifle-calibre machine guns for defence against air attack. 3,400 ships had been armed by the end of 1940, and all ships were armed by 1943.

The low-angle guns were typically in the 3-inch to 6-inch range (75–150 mm) depending on the size of the ship. Rifle-calibre machine guns were augmented or replaced by Oerlikon 20 mm cannon as they became available. The high-angle QF 12-pdr Mk V mount was the most common anti-aircraft gun and later ships sometimes received Bofors 40 mm guns.

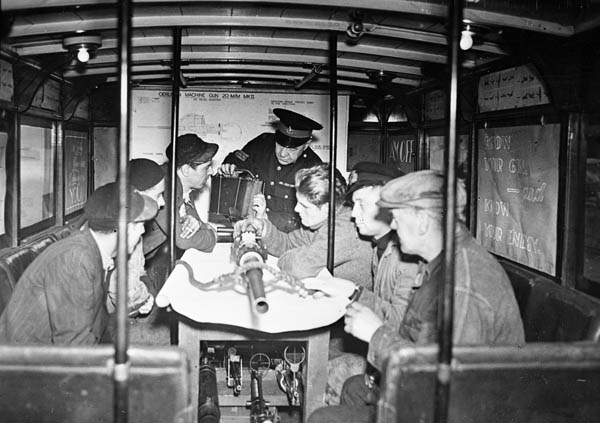
An army sergeant instructing merchant seamen in DEMS gunnery. The classroom is a converted bus.

Untrained gunners posed significant risk to friendly aircraft in the absence of efficient communications. DEMS guns were manned by 24,000 Royal Navy personnel and 14,000 men of the Royal Artillery Maritime Regiment. 150,000 merchant sailors were trained to assist by passing ammunition, loading and replacing casualties. Initially, Royal Artillery personnel provided anti-aircraft protection by bringing their own machine-guns aboard ships operating close to the British Isles. DEMS gunners were often retired military personnel and young Hostilities Only ratings, commanded by a petty officer or Royal Marine sergeant. Large ships sometimes embarked a junior naval officer to command the DEMS gunners. Canada placed guns on 713 ships, while the Royal Australian Navy provided gun crews for 375 Australian and other Allied ships.

=== D-day landings and the Royal Observer Corps ===
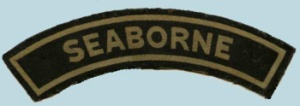
ROC "seaborne" shoulder flash

In 1944, during preparations for the invasion of France called Operation Overlord, there was deep concern over the danger to Allied aircraft from the large number of DEMS involved in the landings. A request for volunteer aircraft recognition experts from the Royal Observer Corps produced 1,094 highly qualified candidates, from which 796 were selected to perform valuable aircraft recognition duties as seaborne volunteers.

These Seaborne Observers were organised by Group Commandant C. G. Cooke and trained at the Royal Bath Hotel Bournemouth before the volunteers temporarily joined the Royal Navy with the rank of petty officer (aircraft identifier). The volunteers continued to wear their ROC uniforms, but wore seaborne shoulder flashes and a Royal Navy brassard with the letters RN. In the D-day landings, two seaborne observers were allocated to each of the defensively equipped British and American merchant vessels. The ROC volunteers were given direct control of each ship's anti-aircraft batteries, immediately reducing the previously high level of friendly fire incidents. Their success is measured by a signal from Wing Commander P. B. Lucas, air staff officer who reported:

The general impression amongst the Spitfire wings, covering our land and naval forces over and off the beach-head, appears to be that in the majority of cases the fire has come from warships and not from the merchant ships. Indeed I personally have yet to hear a single pilot report that a merchant vessel had opened fire on him

— Lucas

22 seaborne observers survived their ships being sunk, two lost their lives and several more were injured in the landings. The "seaborne" operation was an unqualified success and in recognition, His Majesty King George Vl approved the wearing of the "seaborne" flash as a permanent feature of the uniform. In addition, ten "seaborne" members were mentioned in despatches. After the invasion and just before his death Air Chief Marshal Trafford Leigh-Mallory wrote the following to be circulated to all ROC personnel:

I have read reports from both pilots and naval officers regarding the Seaborne volunteers on board merchant vessels during recent operations. All reports agree that the Seaborne volunteers have more than fulfilled their duties and have undoubtedly saved many of our aircraft from being engaged by our ships guns. I should be grateful if you would please convey to all ranks of the Royal Observer Corps, and in particular to the Seaborne observers themselves, how grateful I, and all pilots in the Allied Expeditionary Air Force, are for their assistance, which has contributed in no small measure to the safety of our own aircraft, and also to the efficient protection of the ships at sea. The work of the Royal Observer Corps is quite often unjustly overlooked, and receives little recognition, and I therefore wish that the service they rendered on this occasion be as widely advertised as possible, and all units of the Air Defence of Great Britain are therefore to be informed of the success of this latest venture of the Royal Observer Corps.

— Leigh-Mallory

As of 2010 there is a Seaborne Observers’ Association for the dwindling number of survivors. Air Vice-Marshal George Black (Rtd.), a former Commandant ROC, is the honorary president.

== Japan ==
The Imperial Japanese Army established several shipping artillery units in World War II. These provided detachments to protect Army-operated transports and chartered merchant ships from air or submarine attack. The Imperial Japanese Navy also formed air defence squads from April 1944 that were deployed on board ships.

== United States ==
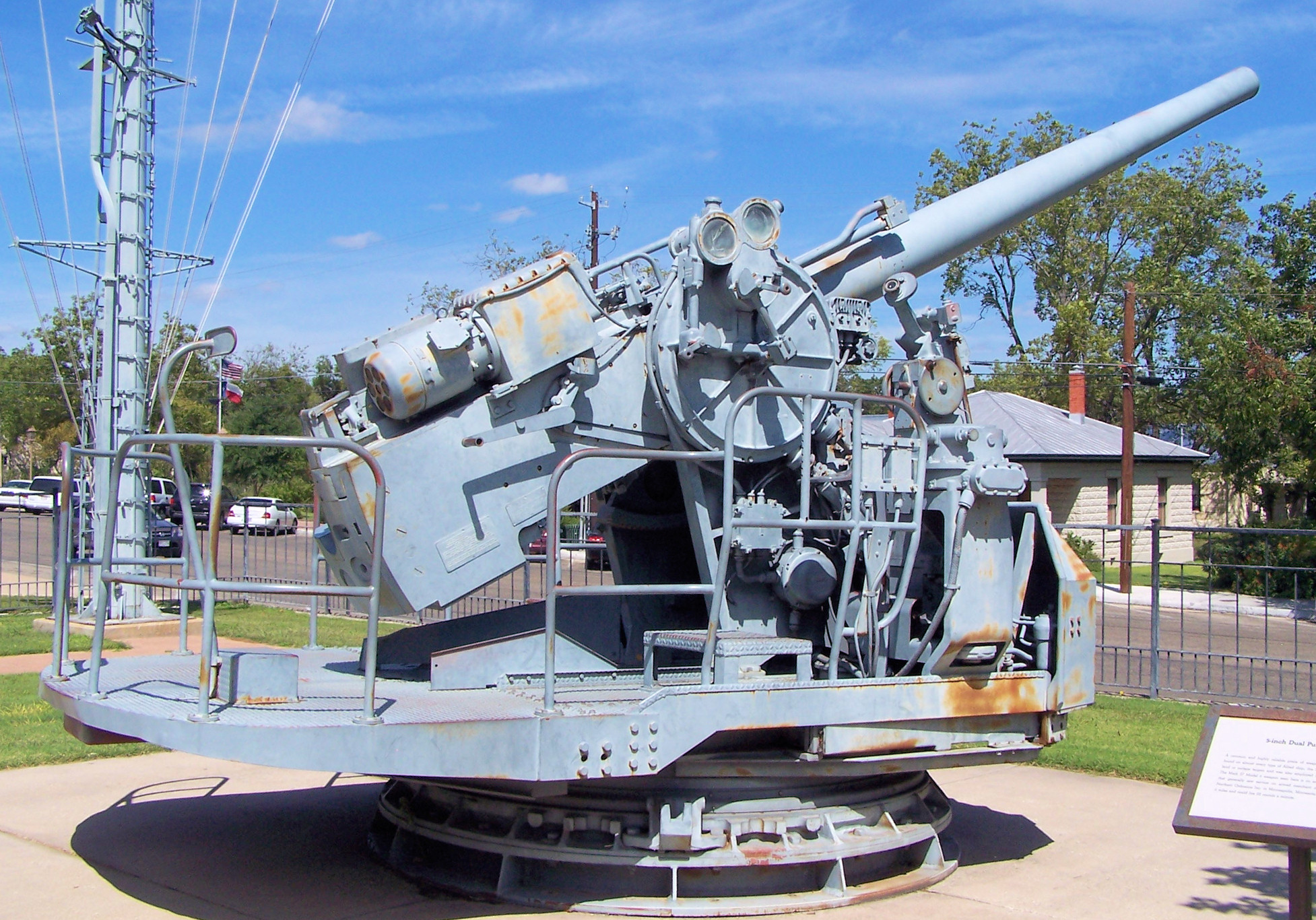
5"/38 calibre dual-purpose Mark 37 gun mount used on US merchant ships. This example is preserved at the National Museum of the Pacific War.

The Merchant Marine Act of 1936 identified mariners aboard United States flagged merchant ships as military personnel in time of war. Neutrality Acts prevented arming of United States flagged merchant ships until 17 November 1941, although American-owned ships under Panamanian registry had been armed earlier. Guns were manned by United States Navy Armed Guard. The United States began equipping ships of other nations with guns and United States Navy Armed Guard on 24 January 1942; and about 145,000 USN armed guards ultimately sailed aboard 6,236 merchant ships. United States policy was stated by the Vice Chief of Naval Operations on 19 August 1942: "Ships sailing independently should be armed. Ships sailing in regularly made-up convoys, other than ships bound to North Russia or tankers en route to the United Kingdom, may sail unarmed if the urgency of delivery of their cargo warrants it."

The United States followed the British practice of a single large gun aft. Early United States installations included low-angle 4"/50 calibre guns (Mark 9) removed from old Wickes-class destroyers and Clemson-class destroyers. The first installations of dual-purpose 5"/38 calibre guns began in September 1942, on new ships over 10,000 tons. Victory ships carried a 3-inch gun on the bow, 20 mm machine gun tubs port and starboard between the first and second holds; a second pair of 20 mm guns on the bridge wings, a third pair on the after edge of the superstructure, and a fourth pair between the after (Number 5) hatch and the 5"/38 calibre gun on the stern.

== See also ==
- Armed merchantmen
- Commerce raiding
- East Indiaman
- Hired armed vessels
- Merchant raider
- STUFT – ships taken up from trade
- Q-ship
