= SS Ruahine =

History
- Name: until 1949: Ruahine; after 1949: Auriga
- Namesake: until 1949: Ruahine Range; after 1949: Auriga (constellation)
- Owner: until 1949: New Zealand Shipping Co; after 1949: Fratelli Grimaldi
- Operator: until 1949: New Zealand Shipping Co; after 1949: Fratelli Grimaldi
- Port of registry: until 1949: (United Kingdom) Plymouth; after 1949: (Italy) Naples
- Builder: William Denny and Brothers
- Yard number: 880
- Launched: 19 August 1909
- Completed: 6 November 1909
- Identification: UK official number 124582; code letters HPVS (1909–33); call sign GLYM (1934–49)
- Fate: Scrapped 1957

General characteristics
- Type: Ocean liner
- Tonnage: 10,870 GRT, 6,872 NRT
- Length: 480.6 ft (146.5 m) registered; 497 feet (151 m) o/a
- Beam: 60.3 ft (18.4 m)
- Depth: 32.1 ft (9.8 m)
- Decks: 3
- Installed power: 848 NHP
- Propulsion: 2 × triple-expansion steam engines; 2 × screws
- Speed: 14 knots (26 km/h)
- Capacity: as built: 520 passengers; from 1926: passenger accommodation reduced; from 1933: 220 tourist class passengers; from 1949: 800 passengers; 274,549 cubic feet (7,774.4 m^{3}) refrigerated cargo
- Sensors & processing systems: by 1930: wireless direction finding; from 1935: echo sounding device
- Notes: sister ships: Rotorua, Remuera

SS Ruahine was a UK-built ocean liner and refrigerated cargo ship. She was launched in 1909 in Scotland for the New Zealand Shipping Company, who operated her in scheduled service between Britain and New Zealand. She survived both World wars.

In 1949 she was sold to Fratelli Grimaldi of Italy, who renamed her Auriga. She was scrapped in 1957.

She was the second of three NZ Shipping Co ships called Ruahine. The first was a steamship that was launched in 1891, sold and renamed in 1900 and scrapped in 1945. The third was the motor ship Ruahine that was launched in 1950, sold in 1967, renamed in 1968 and scrapped in 1974.

== Building ==
William Denny and Brothers built Ruahine at Dumbarton. She was launched on 19 August 1909 and completed on 6 November. She was 497 ft (151 m) long overall, 480.6 ft (146.5 m) registered length, 60.3 ft (18.4 m) beam and 32.1 ft (9.8 m) depth. Her tonnages were 10,870 GRT and 6,872 NRT.

Ruahine had twin screws driven by twin triple-expansion steam engines. Between them they were rated at 848 NHP and gave her a service speed of 14 knots (26 km/h).

As built, Ruahine had berths for 520 passengers divided into three classes. Her holds had capacity for 274,549 cubic feet (7,774.4 m^{3}) of refrigerated cargo.

Denny's followed Ruahine with two sister ships for the New Zealand Shipping Company: Rotorua launched in 1910 and Remuera launched in 1911.

== Service ==
Ruahine entered service for the New Zealand Shipping Company in 1910, sailing from London to Auckland and Wellington. Her primary passenger traffic was emigrants from Britain to New Zealand. Her cargo was finished goods to New Zealand and raw foods to Britain.

Ruahine was refitted in 1926 with reduced passenger accommodation, and again in 1933 with 220 tourist class berths.

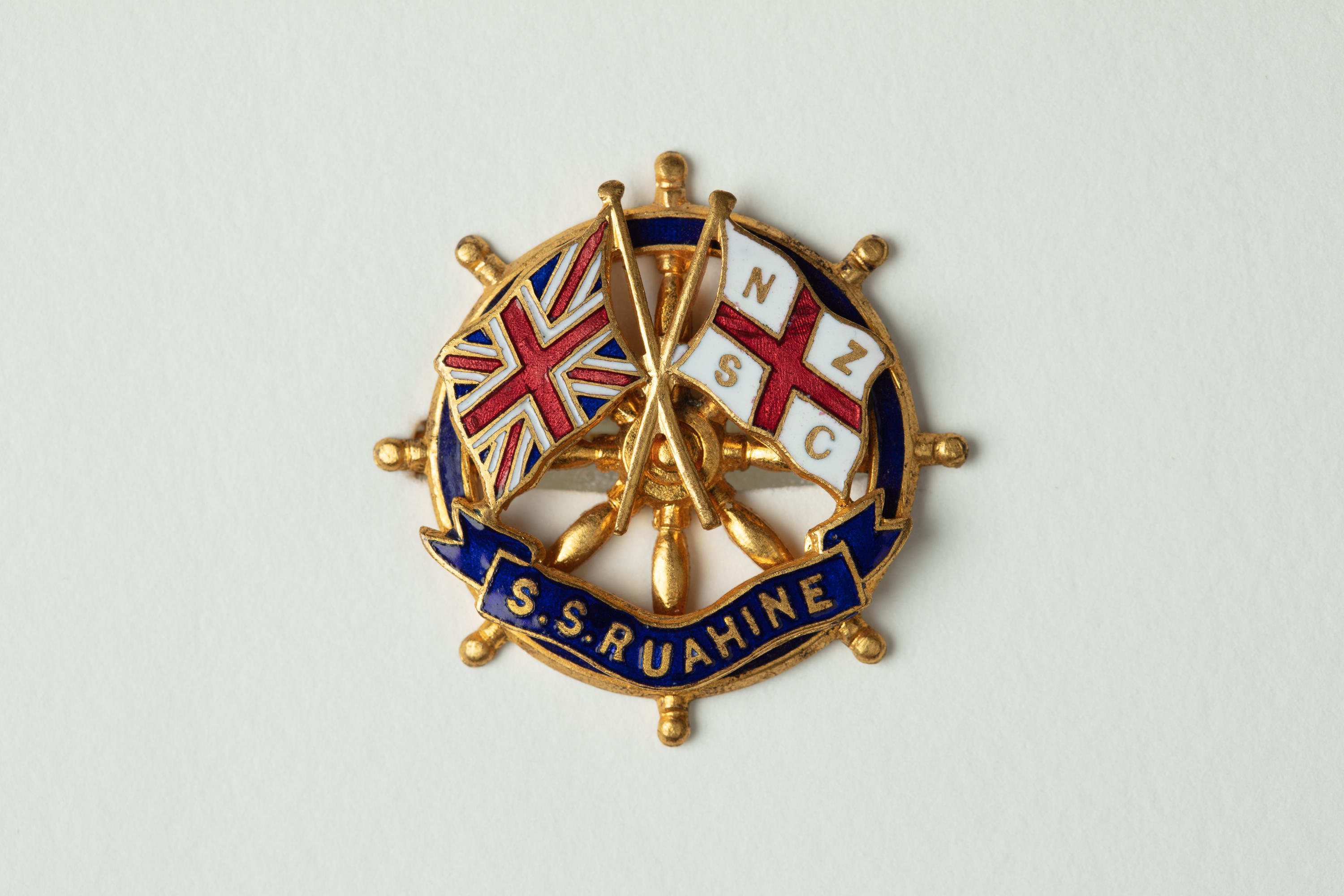
SS Ruahine New Zealand Shipping Company Badge

By 1930 Ruahine had wireless direction finding equipment. In 1934 the call sign GLYM superseded Ruahine's code letters HPVS. By 1935 she was fitted with an echo sounding device.

On 4 February 1938 Ruahine was involved in a collision with the Royal Fleet Auxiliary tanker RFA Broomdale, which was on sea trials in the Firth of Clyde.

From 1938 Ruahine ceased carrying passengers. From May 1938 until October 1939 she was laid up in the River Fal.

In 1949 Fratelli Grimaldi bought Ruahine, renamed her Auriga, and had her refitted to carry 800 passengers. She operated on emigrant routes from Italy and France. She was scrapped in 1957 at Savona in Italy.
