= Action of 10 March 1917 =

Single-ship action in the First World War

Coordinates: 37.95°N 17.92°W

- Part of the Atlantic U-boat campaign of World War I
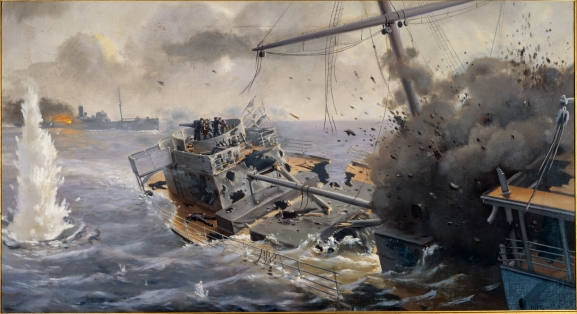
- The sinking of Otaki by SMS Möwe
Date	10 March 1917
Location	Atlantic Ocean
Result	German victory

Belligerents
Germany	New Zealand

Commanders and leaders
Nikolaus Schlodien	Archibald Smith †

Strength
1 auxiliary cruiser	2 merchant steamers

Casualties and losses
5 killed; 10 wounded; 1 auxiliary cruiser damaged	6 killed; 200 captured; 1 merchant steamer sunk; 1 merchant steamer scuttled

The action of 10 March 1917 was a single-ship action in the First World War between the Imperial German Navy merchant raider SMS Möwe and the defensively-armed New Zealand Shipping Company cargo ship Otaki. Otaki was sunk, but Möwe was badly damaged.

== Background ==
SMS Möwe was already well-known. Her commander, Korvettenkapitän Count Nikolaus zu Dohna-Schlodien, had taken Möwe around the World in 1915 and early 1916, sinking several vessels and fighting one engagement on 16 January with a UK cargo ship.

With a veteran crew and ship, Kapitän Dohna-Schlodien eluded the Allied blockade of Germany in December 1916 and headed for mid-Atlantic, taking several vessels along the way.

== Action ==
On 10 March 1917, after months at sea and now returning to Germany, Möwe was in open ocean. At about 02:00 she found the 4,491-ton Pacific Steam Navigation Company ship Esmeraldas, which was sailing west to Baltimore. Möwe stopped Esmereldas, took off her crew and scuttled her with explosives.

Then on the horizon, about 350 nautical miles (650 km) east of São Miguel Island, Möwe sighted Otaki, a 7,420-gross-ton refrigerated cargo ship of the New Zealand Shipping Company sailing from London to New York. Her defence was one 4.7 inch gun mounted aft with a Royal Navy gun crew.

Otaki carried a wireless and could have alerted the Allies to Möwe's position. In heavy seas and intermittent squalls Otaki was making about 13 knots (24 km/h). Möwe immediately gave chase, and when she closed on Otaki, Dohna-Schlodien signalled Otaki to stop. Otaki's Master, Archibald Bisset Smith, refused to surrender. Möwe fired warning shots but Otaki returned fire with her 4.7 inch gun.

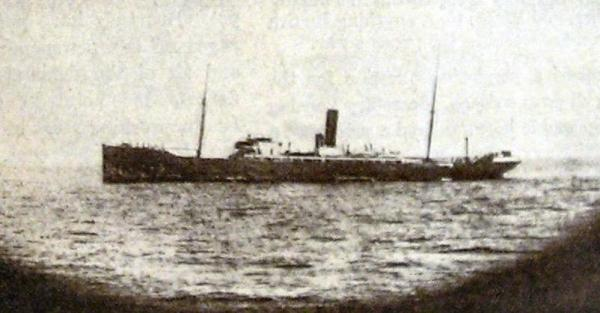
Möwe in 1916 on her first cruise

Several shots hit Möwe at a range of 2,000 yards (1,800 m), badly damaging her before her crew managed to return fire. When Möwe did open fire, her gunnery was accurate and several 150 mm shells hit Otaki. The battle lasted about 20 minutes until Otaki capsized and sank.

Most of Otaki's rounds hit Möwe topside, but her hull was also hit. Five German crew were killed, another ten wounded, and the German ship was on fire and shipping water.

Smith ordered his crew to abandon ship. The last men to leave were the Chief Officer, Roland McNish, and the ship's carpenter, who jumped together. They thought Smith was doing the same, but he was not found. Afterwards it was assumed that Smith remained aboard.

Four of his crew were killed in the action, including the Third Engineer. Also among the dead were two deck apprentices who were members of her gun crew. A fifth man, the Chief Steward, F Willis, was killed when abandoning ship. Willis jumped into the sea after the lifeboats had been launched, but drowned before he could be rescued.

Möwe rescued the survivors. She was now carrying more than 200 prisoners from Esmeraldas and Otaki.

== Aftermath ==
The damage caused by Otaki started fires in Möwe's coal bunkers, which burned for two days and nearly reached her magazine. She also sustained serious flooding by being holed by Otaki's shells; this had required counter-flooding to correct the list, and more was let in to quench the fires.

The damage forced Dohna-Schlodien to take Möwe back to Germany. Within a month she was back in German waters after running past the Allied blockade a fourth and final time. Once again Dohna-Schlodien was rewarded.

The survivors of Otaki and crew of Esmeraldas were taken to Brandenburg, where they remained prisoners for the rest of war. Möwe spent the rest of the war serving with the German fleet in the Baltic Sea as a minelayer.

== Legacy ==
Möwe's captain, Nikolaus zu Dohna-Schlodien, described Otaki's resistance as "a duel as gallant as naval history can relate". In November 1917 King George V officially commended Chief Officer McNish, who by then had been promoted to captain, and posthumously commended Captain Smith and Apprentice Basil Kilner.

After the Armistice of 11 November 1918 more details of the battle reached the UK authorities, so in May 1919 Smith was posthumously awarded the Victoria Cross and McNish was made a Companion of the Distinguished Service Order. At the time civilians were ineligible for the Victoria Cross, so Smith was posthumously commissioned into the Royal Naval Reserve as a lieutenant to receive it. Smith was one of only two members of the UK Merchant marine to be awarded the VC for actions in the First World War.

Otaki could not have resisted Möwe so effectively or for so long without the accuracy of her Royal Navy gun layer and the professionalism and speed of her gun crew. Leading Seaman AF Worth, Royal Fleet Reserve, and Able Seaman Ellis Jackson, RNVR, were awarded the Distinguished Service Medal and Apprentices Basil Kilner and William Martin were posthumously mentioned in dispatches.

Smith had been educated at Robert Gordon's College in Aberdeen, Scotland. In 1937 his family presented the Otaki Shield to the school. It is awarded annually to a senior boy who is "outstanding in character, in qualities of leadership and athletics". Each year the New Zealand Shipping Company awarded free passage for the winner of the shield to visit New Zealand, and the NZ Government provided transport and accommodation during the winner's visit. When P&O absorbed the NZ Shipping Co in 1973 it took over the travelling scholarship.

William Martin was a boy only 14 years old. A memorial at St Mary's Kirk, Auchindoir in Aberdeenshire commemorates him. Like Captain Smith he was a pupil of Robert Gordon's College. He had left school on 21 February to join the ship. His parents commemorated their son by giving his school a William E Martin prize to award annually for English and modern languages.
