= Geier (freighter) =

British cargo ship captured by the German Empire

History

United Kingdom
- Name: Saint Théodore
- Owner: Brit. & Foreign. S.S. Co.
- Port of registry: Liverpool
- Builder: W. Hamilton & Co., Glasgow
- Laid down: 1913
- Launched: 25 April 1913
- Fate: Captured by SMS Möwe and scuttled on 14 February 1917

German Empire
- Name: German: Geier
- Namesake: Vulture
- Acquired: 12 December 1916 (taken as prize)
- Commissioned: 28 December 1916
- Fate: scuttled on 14 February 1917

General characteristics
- Type: auxiliary cruiser; (German: (Hilfskreuzer)
- Tonnage: 4,992 gross register tons (GRT)
- Displacement: 9,700 long tons (9,856 t)
- Length: 127.2 m (417 ft 4 in)
- Beam: 15.85 m (52 ft 0 in)
- Height: 8.25 m (27 ft 1 in)
- Draught: 6.4 m (21 ft)
- Decks: 2
- Propulsion: 1,800 ihp (1,300 kW) steam engine
- Speed: 12.6 knots (23.3 km/h; 14.5 mph)
- Crew: As German auxiliary cruiser: 2 officers, 46 enlisted
- Armament: As German auxiliary cruiser: 2 × 5.2 cm (2.0 in) guns

Geier was a British cargo ship named Saint Théodore that was captured by the German commerce raider Möwe in the North Atlantic Ocean at 39°30′N 17°30′W on 12 December 1916. First put into Imperial German Navy service as an auxiliary ship on 14 December 1916, Geier was commissioned as an auxiliary cruiser (German: Hilfskreuzer) on 28 December and operated in the South Atlantic Ocean until 14 February 1917, when she was scuttled near Ilha da Trindade.
