= QF 4.7-inch Mk V naval gun =

QF 4.7 inch Gun Mk V
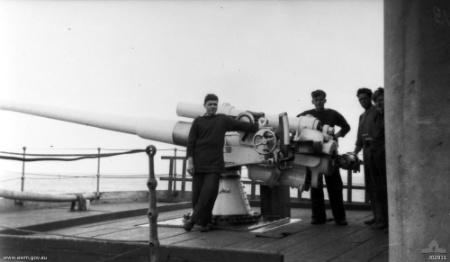
- On troopship Orca, March 1919
- Type: Naval gun Coast defence gun
- Place of origin: United Kingdom; Japan

Service history
- In service: 1900–1945
- Used by: British Empire; Ottoman Empire
- Wars: World War I World War II

Production history
- Designer: Elswick Ordnance
- Designed: ca. 1895
- Variants: Mark V, Mark V*

Specifications
- Mass: Barrel & breech 5,936 pounds (2,693 kg)
- Barrel length: 212.6 inches (5.40 m) (45 cal)
- Shell: Separate loading QF 45 pounds (20.41 kg) Common Pointed, Lyddite
- Calibre: 4.724 inches (120 mm)
- Breech: single motion interrupted screw
- Recoil: 8 inch
- Elevation: -10° to +20°
- Rate of fire: Approx. 8-10 rounds per minute
- Muzzle velocity: 2,350 feet per second (720 m/s)
- Maximum firing range: 16,500 yards (15,100 m)

The QF 4.7 inch Gun Mark V originated as a 4.7 in (120 mm) 45-calibre naval gun designed by the Elswick Ordnance Company for export customers and known as the Pattern Y.

== United Kingdom service ==
The Royal Navy did not adopt the gun, but several were adopted by the army as coast defence guns around the United Kingdom from 1900 onwards. In World War I the UK acquired 620 of a version manufactured in Japan, and mounted them as anti-submarine guns on merchant ships and troop ships, under the designation Mark V*. Many of these guns were used again in World War II on defensively armed merchant ships and troop ships.

== Notable actions ==
On 10 March 1917 the crew of a single gun on the refrigerated cargo liner Otaki fought a notable action against the heavily armed German commerce raider SMS Möwe. They managed to set the Möwe on fire and inflicted significant damage before the Otaki was sunk. Otaki's Master Archibald Bisset Smith went down with his ship and was posthumously awarded the Victoria Cross for refusing to surrender his ship.

== See also ==
- Type 3 120 mm 45 caliber naval gun version in service with the Imperial Japanese Navy from 1918
- QF 4.7 inch Gun Mk I – IV 40-calibre version adopted by the Royal Navy
- List of naval guns
- Brixham Battery World War II Emergency Coastal Defence Battery using this gun
