= SS Otaki =

New Zealand cargo steamship

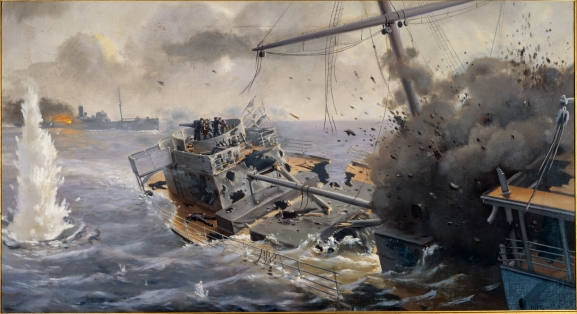
- Otaki sinking on 10 March 1917

History

United Kingdom
- Name: Otaki
- Namesake: Either the town or the river Ōtaki
- Owner: Haycraft & Westray (1908–10) New Zealand Shipping Company (1910–17)
- Operator: Haycraft, Cowan & King (1909)
- Port of registry: Plymouth
- Route: New Zealand – Great Britain
- Builder: Wm Denny & Bros, Dumbarton
- Yard number: 835
- Launched: 15 August 1908
- Completed: 22 October 1908
- Identification: UK official number 124576; Code letters HNJG; Call sign MRP
- Fate: Sunk by enemy action 10 March 1917

General characteristics
- Type: Refrigerated cargo ship
- Tonnage: 7,420 GRT; 4,611 NRT; 10,630 DWT
- Length: 465.4 ft (141.9 m)
- Beam: 60.3 ft (18.4 m)
- Draught: 28.7 ft (8.7 m)
- Depth: 34.0 ft (10.4 m)
- Installed power: 471 NHP
- Propulsion: 2 × triple-expansion steam engines; 1 × low-pressure steam turbine; 3 × propellers
- Speed: 15 knots (28 km/h)
- Capacity: 290,000 cu ft (8,200 m^{3}) of cargo; 6 passengers
- Crew: 72
- Armament: (as DEMS): 1 × 4.7-inch gun

SS Otaki was a New Zealand Shipping Company refrigerated cargo steamship that was built in Scotland in 1908 and sunk by a German merchant raider in 1917.

Otaki's design is notable because she was the first ship whose propulsion combined reciprocating steam engines with a low-pressure steam turbine.

Otaki's loss is also notable because although the merchant raider SMS Möwe sank her, Otaki damaged Möwe enough to force her attacker to return to port, ending her raiding career. Otaki's Master, Archibald Bisset Smith, was posthumously awarded the Victoria Cross.

== Four ships called Otaki ==
Ōtaki is a coastal town in the North Island, New Zealand, near the mouth of the Ōtaki River. The New Zealand Shipping Company has given the name to four successive ships. The 1908–1917 ship is the second of those ships.

== Turbines versus reciprocating engines ==
The fuel efficiency and performance of marine steam engines had been improved by compounding in the 1860s, followed by triple and quadruple expansion in the 1880s.

Each compounding stage has a larger cylinder and piston than the one before. A quadruple-expansion engine is more efficient than a triple-expansion engine and may be faster, but it is heavier and more complex.

The steam turbine, as demonstrated in Turbinia in 1894, was first applied to a commercial ship in King Edward in 1901. A turbine is smaller, simpler, lighter, faster, smoother and more reliable than an equivalent triple- or quadruple-expansion piston engine. But a turbine requires higher fuel consumption and is efficient only at high speed.

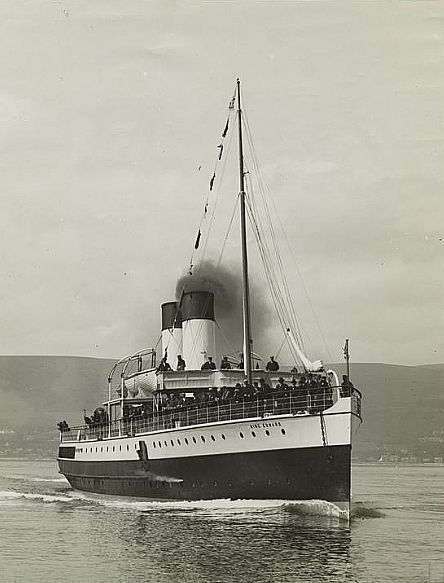
William Denny and Brothers built King Edward in 1901 with three propellers and a central low-pressure turbine

William Denny and Brothers of Dumbarton built King Edward with three turbines and three propellers. A high-pressure turbine drove the shaft of her middle propeller. Exhaust steam from this turbine fed a pair of low-pressure turbines that drove her port and starboard (wing) propeller.

The first turbine-powered ocean liners, RMS Victorian and Virginian, were launched in 1904. In January 1905, before either of them was completed, Charles Parsons predicted that steam turbines would supersede reciprocating engines in ships of more than 16 knots (30 km/h) and more than 5,000 IHP, but that for slower and smaller ships a combination of reciprocating and turbine power would probably be more economical. Otaki was the first ship to fulfil his prediction.

== Combining reciprocating and turbine engines ==
Denny's, who built King Edward, also built Otaki. Like King Edward with three propellers. But unlike King Edward a low-pressure turbine drove her middle propeller, her wing engines were triple-expansion piston engines, and exhaust steam from the wing engines drove the middle engine. Otaki was thus the first ship in which the fuel efficiency of a fourth stage of expansion was achieved not by a quadruple-expansion engine but by combining triple-expansion engines with a turbine.

Turbines do not work in reverse. Otaki was able to go astern efficiently by shutting down her low-pressure turbine, reversing her reciprocating engines and redirecting their exhaust steam straight to her condensers.

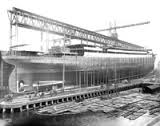
Harland and Wolff was building Laurentic when Otaki was launched

At the same time that Denny's built Otaki, Harland and Wolff built the 14,892 GRT Laurentic with the same combination. Laurentic was launched on 10 September 1908, less than a month after Otaki, and completed on 15 April 1909. Harland and Wolff had built Laurentic's sister ship Megantic with twin quadruple-expansion engines and without a low-pressure turbine, which allowed direct comparison of the two systems.

Laurentic proved to be more powerful and more economical than Megantic, thus vindicating the combination pioneered in Otaki. This led Harland and Wolff to combine reciprocating and turbine power in the much larger RMS Olympic, Titanic and Britannic for White Star Line. Denny's went on to build a passenger liner with a similar combination of machinery for the NZ Shipping Co. She was the 11,130 GRT liner Rotorua, launched in 1910.

Other shipbuilders adopted the same combination in ships that were large enough to justify having at least three propellers, and that needed a speed of at least 12 to 15 knots (22 to 28 km/h). Ships with reciprocating engines and turbines driving separate shafts continued to be built until at least the 1920s. A later example is the second Laurentic, launched in 1927 for White Star Line.

However, most merchant ships have only one or two propellers, and in the early decades of the 20th century many ran at an economical speed of 10 knots (19 km/h) or less. Parsons predicted that a combination of reciprocating and turbine power would eventually be applied to 10-knot ships in the tramp trade, but in practice this was not achieved until the 1920s.

== Construction and description ==
Denny's built Otaki to carry meat from New Zealand to the United Kingdom. She was launched on 15 August 1908 and completed on 22 October. She was 465.4 ft (141.9 m) long, had a beam of 60.3 ft (18.4 m) and draught of 28.7 ft (8.7 m). Her holds were refrigerated and had capacity for 290,000 cubic feet (8,200 m^{3}) of cargo. She had berths for six passengers. Her tonnages were measured at 7,420 gross register tons (GRT), 4,611 net register tons (NRT) and 10,630 tons deadweight (DWT).

Otaki had five single-ended Howden boilers supplying steam to the pair of three-cylinder triple-expansion engines that drove her wing shafts. When steaming ahead, exhaust steam from the low-pressure cylinders fed a low-pressure Parsons turbine that drove her centre shaft. Her triple-expansion engines developed a combined total of 4,444 indicated horsepower (3,314 kW) at 103 rpm. Her turbine developed 2,414 shaft horsepower (1,800 kW) at 227 rpm. These were far lower and more economical speeds than King Edward, whose middle propeller ran at up to 700 rpm and wing propellers ran at up to 1,000 rpm.

The drive from Otaki's low pressure turbine to her middle propeller was direct. Reduction gearing to reconcile the high speeds of turbines with the low speeds of marine propellers was not introduced on ships until about 1911. Nevertheless, the combined power of her reciprocating engines and turbine gave Otaki a top speed of 15.7 knots (29.1 km/h; 18.1 mph) on her sea trial, which was faster than most cargo ships of her era.

The NZ Shipping Co registered Otaki at Plymouth. Her UK official number was 124576 and her code letters were HNJG.

== Career ==
In 1909 Otaki caught fire when she arrived in London. In November 1911 she ran aground in the River Thames and, before she was refloated, was rammed by the steamer Bitnia. Off Durban in 1915 Otaki stood by to assist the steamship Benalla, which had caught fire. Two months later in Auckland Otaki caught fire while bunkering.

By 1914 Otaki was equipped for wireless telegraphy, operating on the standard 300 and 600 metre wavelengths. Her call sign was MRP.

On 30 May 1916 Otaki became the first NZ Shipping Co vessel to pass through the Panama Canal, which had been opened in August 1914.

== Loss ==
In the First World War Otaki was defensively armed with one 4.7-inch gun on her stern. Two Royal Navy gunners were added to her crew to train and lead a gun crew of volunteers drawn from a ship's civilian complement.

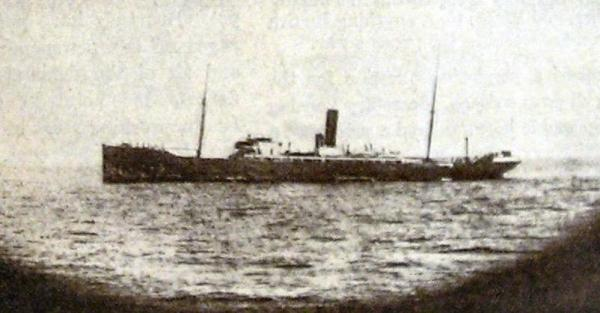
SMS Möwe

In late February or early March 1917 Otaki had sailed from Britain for New Zealand. Late on the afternoon of 10 March the Imperial German Navy raider Möwe intercepted her in the Atlantic about 420 miles west of Lisbon. Möwe had four 150-mm guns, one 105-mm gun and two torpedo tubes.

Möwe ordered Otaki to heave to. Otaki's Master, Archibald Smith, could have surrendered to ensure the safety of his crew. However, as a refrigerated ship built to carry food, Otaki was highly valuable to the Allied war effort. Smith had reason to want to prevent her scuttling or capture. He refused to surrender, and Otaki opened fire at a range of about 1,900 or 2,000 yards.

Otaki's gunners were accurate, hitting Möwe''s superstructure and hull, setting fire to coal in her bunkers, killing five German crew and wounding 10 others. But when Möwe opened fire with her four 150-mm guns she caused Otaki greater damage. The two ships fought for about 20 minutes, until Otaki had sustained about 30 hits. A shell from Möwe hit Otaki starboard aft, causing her to ship water, lose speed and lose manouevreability. Then Otaki's 4.7-inch gun was damaged.

Smith ordered his crew to abandon ship but himself went down with his ship. Five of his crew were killed. The youngest was a 14-year-old midshipman, William Esson Martin, who had joined the ship in England only weeks before she was sunk. He had been a member of Otaki's gun crew.

Möwe rescued and captured the survivors. It took Möwe's crew two days to extinguish the fires Otaki had started and repair Möwe's hull enough to stop her shipping water. Möwe then headed home to Germany for repairs. On her way home she sank two more merchant ships, but the damage inflicted by Otaki had forced the end of Möwe's raiding career.

== Legacy ==
In November 1917 King George V posthumously commended Captain Smith. In May 1919 Smith was posthumously awarded the Victoria Cross. Several other members of Otaki's crew were given awards or mentioned in dispatches.

Both Captain Smith and Midshipman Martin had been pupils at Robert Gordon's College in Aberdeen. Martin's parents commemorated their son by giving the school a William E Martin prize to award annually for English and modern languages.

The school annually awards the Otaki Shield, presented by Smith's family, to a boy who is "pre-eminent in character, in leadership and in athletics" and P&O, which absorbed the NZ Shipping Co in 1973, pays for the winner to visit New Zealand.

== Bibliography ==
- Baker, WA; Tryckare, Tre (1965), The Engine Powered Vessel: From Paddle-Steamer to Nuclear Ship, New York: Grosset & Dunlap
- Dowling, R (1909) [1903]. All About Ships & Shipping (2nd ed.). London: Alexander Moring Ltd.
- Harnack, Edwin P (1930) [1903]. All About Ships & Shipping (3rd ed.). London: Faber and Faber.
- The Marconi Press Agency Ltd (1914). The Year Book of Wireless Telegraphy and Telephony. London: The Marconi Press Agency Ltd.
- Waters, Sydney D (1939). Clipper Ship to Motor Liner; the story of the New Zealand Shipping Company 1873–1939. London: The New Zealand Shipping Company Ltd. pp. 47–48, 74–78.
