= Nikolaus zu Dohna-Schlodien =

German officer and author

- Born: 5 April 1879; Mallmitz, Province of Silesia, Imperial Germany
- Died: 21 August 1956 (aged 77); Baierbach, West Germany
- Military career
- Allegiance: (German Empire) Imperial Germany
- Branch: Imperial German Navy
- Service years: 1896-1919
- Rank: Fregattenkapitän
- Commands: SMS Tsingtau; SMS Mowe
- Conflicts: Boxer Rebellion World War I: Raid on Scarborough; Battle of the Gulf of Riga; Action of 16 January 1916; Action of 10 March 1917
- Awards: Pour le Mérite; Military Order of Max Joseph; Military Order of St. Henry; Military Merit Order (Württemberg); Military Karl-Friedrich Merit Order

Nikolaus Burggraf und Graf zu Dohna-Schlodien (5 April 1879 – 21 August 1956) was a German naval officer and author.

== Biography ==
Nikolaus zu Dohna-Schlodien was born in Mallmitz (today Małomice, Poland) to Alfred zu Dohna-Schlodien (1849–1907) and Margarethe née von der Hagen (1845–1932).

Dohna-Schlodien joined the German Imperial Navy in 1896, became a Second Lieutenant in 1899 and First Lieutenant in 1902. Immediately after the Boxer Rebellion he served on SMS Tiger in East Asia in 1901/02 and became the Commander of the Kanonenboot Tsingtau in 1910–12. In 1913 he became the Navigation officer of Posen and was promoted to a Korvettenkapitän.

=== World War I ===
In 1915, after the outbreak of World War I, the banana freighter Pungo of the F. Laeisz line was reconstructed as a minelayer and armed merchantman, renamed SMS Mowe, and placed under Dohna's command. Through his success as commander of the Möwe, Dohna and his crew became popular war heroes like the crews of Wolf (commanded by Karl August Nerger) and Seeadler (commanded by Felix von Luckner). A motion picture was made in 1917 about Dohna's exploits, and he was appointed naval adjutant to the German emperor, Wilhelm II.

=== Later life ===
After World War I Dohna-Schlodien commanded a Freikorps in the Silesian Uprisings and retired from the Navy in 1919. He worked as a merchant in Hamburg and moved to Baierbach in the 1930s, where he died in 1956.

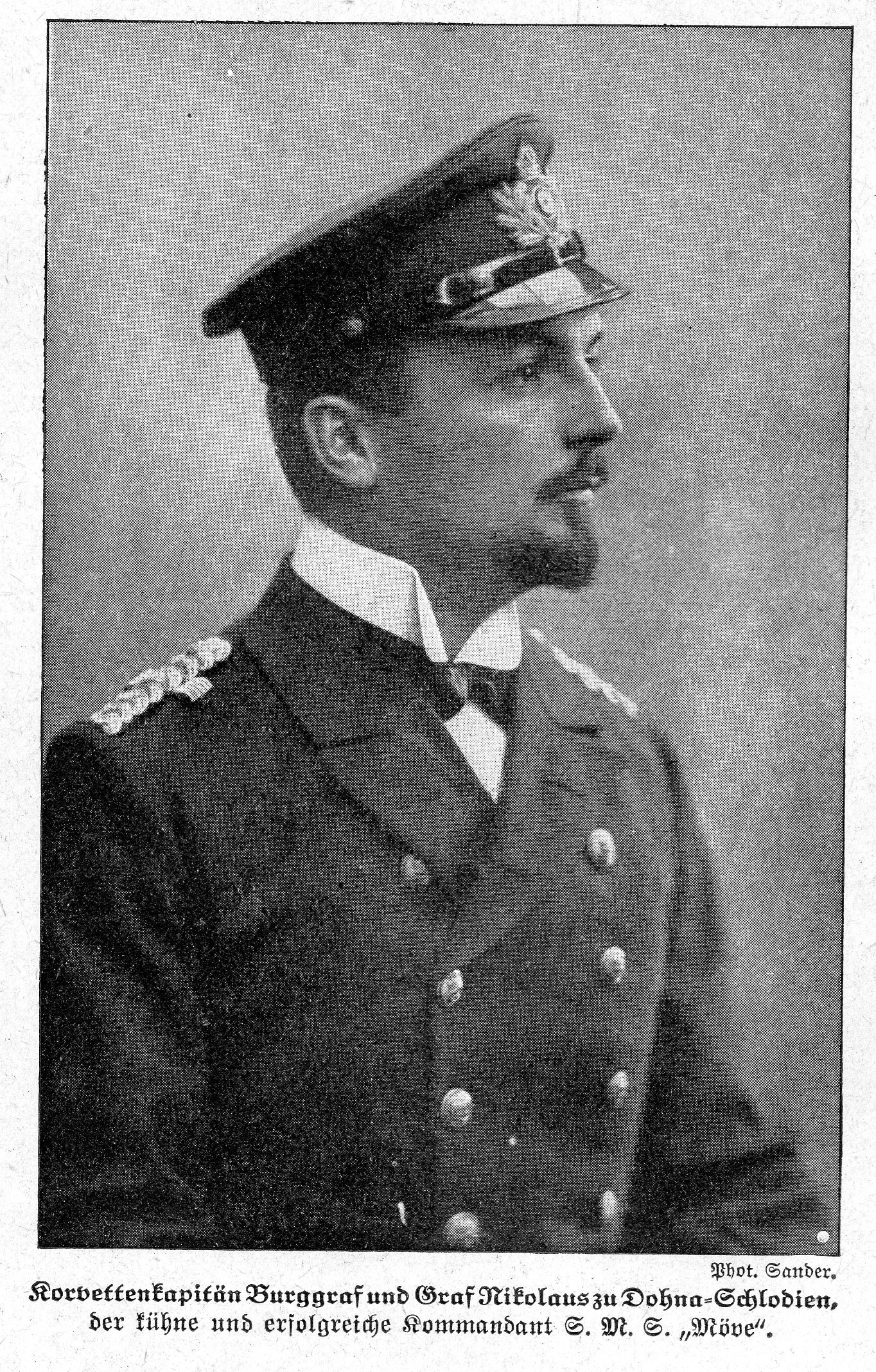
Nikolaus Graf zu Dohna-Schlodien 1916

He married Hilde von Laffert, the widow of one of his good friends and colleagues, Captain Hans von Laffert, commander of Leopard in the action of 16 March 1917. Hilde had one daughter, Marion von Laffert, and Nikolaus and Hilde had two additional daughters together, Hildegarde and Margaret.

Dohna-Schlodien was well remembered and respected by British naval officers. He always made sure to rescue every last survivor of any ships that he had sunk. When the Allies had invaded the Bavarian area, the Dohna-Schlodien family were treated with respect. Special instructions had been given by Allied generals to not interfere with the family and to allow them to remain in their home unfettered during the invasion.

== Decorations and awards ==
Nikolaus Graf Dohna-Schlodien was one of only two German officers of the First World War who received the highest military awards of the five main German states (the other German officer was Karl August Nerger):

- Pour le Mérite (Prussia)
- Military Order of Max Joseph (Bavaria)
- Military Order of St. Henry (Saxony)
- Military Merit Order (Württemberg)
- Military Karl-Friedrich Merit Order (Baden)
- Iron Cross of 1914, 1st and 2nd class

== Publications ==
- S. M. S. Möwe. Perthes, Gotha 1916
- Der Möwe zweite Fahrt. Perthes, Gotha 1917
- Der Möwe Fahrten und Abenteuer. Erzählt von ihrem Kommandanten. Perthes, Stuttgart 1927 (Republication of 1916 und 1917)
