= SMS Möwe (1914) =

German merchant raider

Coordinates: 61°12′N 5°50′E

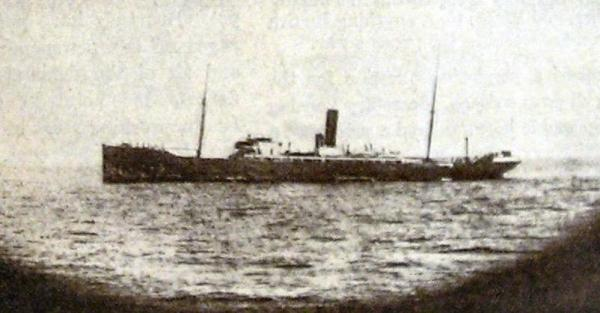

History

German Empire
- Name: Möwe
- Namesake: German for "seagull"
- Ordered: F. Laeisz
- Builder: Joh. C. Tecklenborg, Geestemünde
- Launched: 1914 as Pungo
- In service: 1 November 1915
- Fate: Awarded as war reparations to the UK. Sunk as German freighter Oldenburg, 7 April 1945

General characteristics
- Tonnage: 4,722 GRT, 2,966 NRT
- Displacement: 9,800 tons
- Length: 389 ft (119 m)
- Beam: 49.4 ft (15.1 m)
- Draught: 24 ft (7.2 m)
- Depth: 29.9 ft (9.1 m)
- Installed power: 1 × triple expansion engine, 3,200 ihp, 400 NHP
- Propulsion: 1 × screw
- Speed: 13 knots (24 km/h)
- Range: 8,700 nautical miles (16,100 km) at 12 knots
- Complement: 235
- Armament: 4 × 15 cm SK L/45 naval gun; 1 × 10.5 cm SK L/40 naval gun; 2 × torpedo tubes; 500 mines

SMS Möwe (German pronunciation: [ˈmøːvə]; German: Seagull) was a merchant raider of the Imperial German Navy which operated against Allied shipping during World War I.

Disguised as a neutral cargo ship to enable it to get close to targets, the Möwe was effective at commerce raiding, sinking 40 ships in the course of the war.

== Early history ==
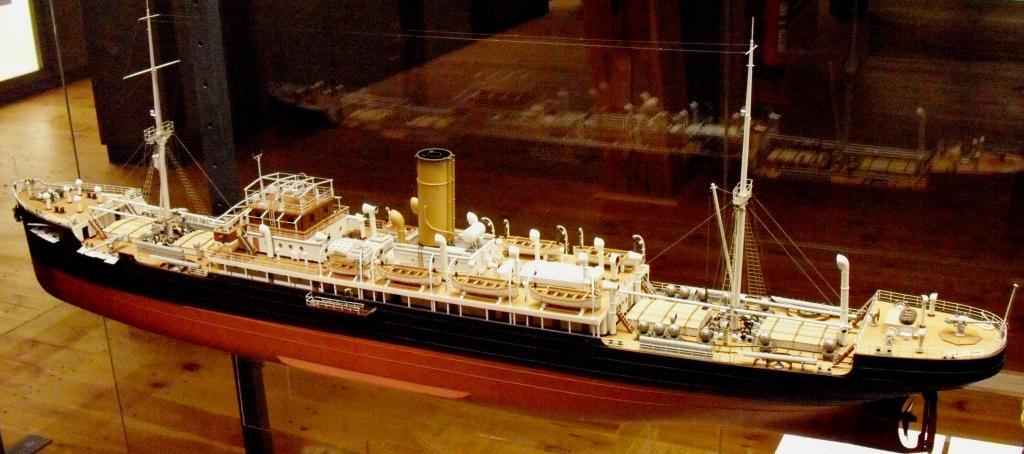
Model of SMS Möwe

Built by the Joh. C. Tecklenborg yard at Geestemünde, she was launched as the banana boat Pungo in 1914, and operated by F. Laeisz of Hamburg for the Afrikanische Fruchtkompanie. After carrying bananas from the German colony of Kamerun to Germany, she was requisitioned by the Imperial German Navy for use as a minelayer and merchant raider. Her conversion took place at Imperial shipyard at Wilhelmshaven in the autumn of 1915, and under the command of Nikolaus zu Dohna-Schlodien, she entered service on 1 November that year.

== First raiding voyage ==
Möwe left Wilhelmshaven on 29 December 1915 for her first task, to set a minefield in the Pentland Firth, near the main base of the British Home Fleet at Scapa Flow. This was completed in severe weather conditions. A few days later the pre-dreadnought battleship HMS King Edward VII struck one of the mines; despite attempts to tow her to safety she sank. Möwe then moved down the west coast of Ireland to France. There she laid another mine field off the Gironde estuary, which sank a further two ships.

This part of her mission complete, Möwe then moved into the Atlantic, operating first between Spain and the Canary Islands, and later off the coast of Brazil.

=== Action of 16 January 1916 ===
The single ship action was fought between a German auxiliary cruiser and a UK cargo ship off the Portuguese islands of Madeira in the Atlantic Ocean.

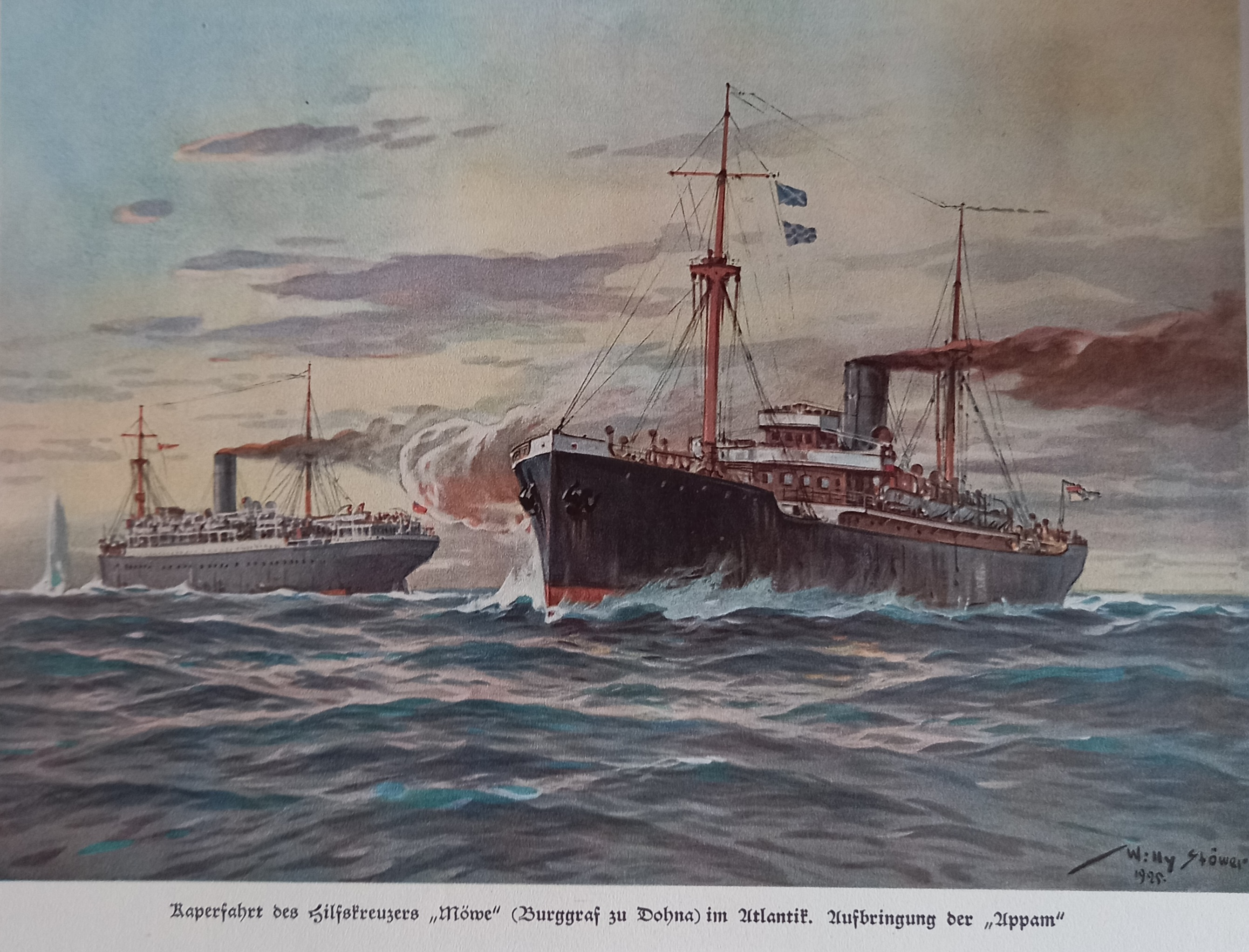
Capture of the Appam

Möwe was steaming about 120 miles south of Madeira with the passenger ship Appam, which she had captured the previous day, placed a prize crew aboard, and transferred several dozen prisoners of war to her. At sunset, lookouts aboard Möwe sighted smoke on the horizon, indicating a ship. Kapitän Dohna-Schlodien ordered Appam to remain behind while he went to investigate. Several minutes later, at about 21:00, Möwe came within distance of making out that the smoke had originated from a large cargo ship, later identified as Clan Mactavish.

By the time Möwe came within close range, it was dark, so Möwe approached cautiously. Using a signal lamp, Dohna-Schlodien asked the cargo ship's name. Clan Mactavish replied by asking that the German ship first identify herself. Dohna-Schlodien signalled that his ship was Author, a Harrison Line ship sailing from Liverpool to Natal. Möwe reportedly looked very similar to Author, which had been sunk by the German Navy a few weeks earlier. Clan Mactavish then signalled her name and that they were returning to Britain from Australia.

Having identified the British ship, Dohna-Schlodien crossed her bow and ordered a halt. Instead of complying, Clan Mactavish changed course and increased speed, hoping to outrun the raider. Möwe fired warning shots and gave chase. Clan Mactavish returned fire with her single gun, but repeatedly missed, and the German ship suffered no damage or casualties. Möwe fired salvoes with her four 150 mm guns. Clan Mactavish sent wireless telegraph distress signals that were received by the armoured cruiser HMS Essex. However, the telegraphist aboard Essex failed to tell his superiors, so no help was sent. After taking four hits, Clan Mactavish caught fire, and her captain signalled his surrender to Möwe. Möwe then manoeuvred for boarding.

All of the German rounds were hits, apart from the warning shots. 18 crew members were killed in the battle, and five others were wounded. A boarding party from Möwe captured Clan Mactavish, and removed her surviving crew as prisoners. Clan Mactavish's captain was a Royal Navy reservist and her gun was crewed by two Royal Navy gunners. The remainder of her crew were civilians. This marked a total of more than 500 Allied prisoners of war on Möwe and Appam. The boarding party scuttled Clan Mactavish with explosive charges.

After sinking Clan Mactavish, Möwe rejoined Appam and set a westward course to avoid any Royal Navy cruisers in the area. Two cruisers were just over 100 mi (87 nmi; 160 km) away and could have intercepted Möwe had the telegraphist aboard Essex responded.

Möwe went on to sink several more Allied ships before returning home. Upon arrival, Korvettenkapitän Dohna-Schlodien was awarded the Iron Cross second class. Richard Stumpf records that there was a number of Africans amongst the crew upon this arrival. Felix von Luckner served aboard Möwe before his journey with SMS Seeadler in late 1916 to late 1917.

== Interlude as Vineta ==
In an effort to maintain security, Möwe was renamed Vineta, after another auxiliary cruiser which had been withdrawn from service. In this guise she set out on a series of short cruises during the summer of 1916 to attack Allied shipping off the coast of Norway. This only brought one success, however, before she was ordered in for a refit prior to another sortie into the Atlantic.

== Second raiding voyage ==
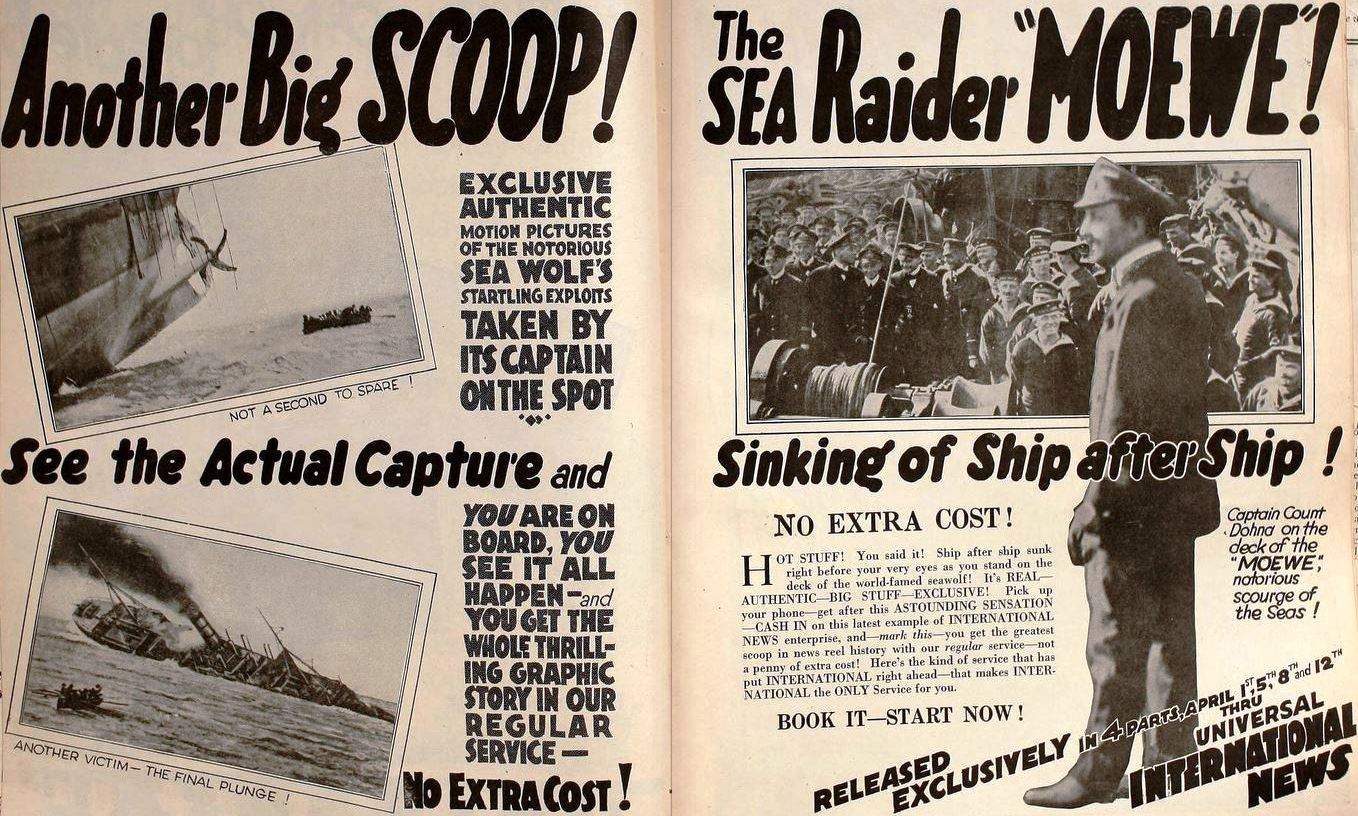
Advertisement for the four-part Hearst newsreel The Sea Raider 'Moeve' (April 1920)

Leaving on 23 November 1916, Möwe had even more success on her second cruise into the Atlantic.

On 6 December 1916, she captured and sank the Canadian Pacific Steamship freighter SS Mount Temple outbound from Halifax to Liverpool. Mount Temple′s cargo included 700 horses bound for the Canadian Expeditionary Force in France and many crates of dinosaur fossils collected from Alberta's Red Deer River badlands by Charles H. Sternberg destined for the British Museum of Natural History. On 12 December, it was the turn of SS Georgic, sunk along with her cargo of 1,200 horses that would have been used on the Western Front.

In four months she had accounted for another 25 ships totalling 123,265 GRT. One of these, SS Yarrowdale, was sent as prize to Germany and, as Dohna-Schlodien had recommended, was outfitted as a commerce raider herself. Möwe also retained SS Saint Theodore as a collier, before arming and commissioning her as the auxiliary Geier. Geier operated in this role for six weeks, accounting for two ships sunk, before being disarmed and scuttled by Möwe prior to returning home. On 10 March, she was damaged in action against an armed New Zealand merchant ship Otaki off the Azores in the Atlantic. Armed with a single 120mm stern gun, the Otaki fought a gallant but doomed action. The Möwe was hit several times and a serious fire was put out with difficulty. The Otaki, however, was hit some thirty times before sinking. Otaki's captain Archibald Bisset Smith was awarded a posthumous Victoria Cross, finally going down in his ship with the British colours still flying”. Five of her crewmen were killed and another ten men were wounded. The damage forced the raider to return course for Germany.

In March 1917 Möwe again successfully ran the British blockade, ironically at the same time as Yarrowdale, now the auxiliary cruiser SMS Leopard, was cornered and sunk by the same blockading force. Möwe arrived home safely on 22 March 1917.

== Later history ==
On her return, Möwe was taken out of service as a raider, being reckoned too valuable as a propaganda tool to be risked again. She served in the Baltic as a submarine tender, before becoming the auxiliary minelayer Ostsee in 1918. After the Treaty of Versailles, she went to Britain, to be operated by Elders and Fyffes as the freighter Greenbrier. In 1933 she was sold to a German shipping company. As the freighter Oldenburg, it served the route between Germany and occupied Norway in World War II.

On 7 April 1945 she was attacked by Bristol Beaufighters of Coastal Command aircraft from No. 144 Squadron RAF, No. 455 Squadron RAAF, and No. 489 Squadron RNZAF at her moorings sheltering off the coast of Norway—near the village of Vadheim in Sogn og Fjordane county. Following an intense strafing and rocket attack, holed by their rockets and strafed by cannon fire, she burned and sank.

== Raiding career ==
In three raiding voyages Möwe captured and sank 40 ships, grossing in excess of 180,000 GRT. She also laid mines which accounted for two more ships and a capital warship. This made her the most successful German raider in either the First or the Second World War.

Ships sunk or captured by Möwe on her first raiding voyage
Date	Ship	Type	Nationality	Tonnage GRT	Fate
11 Jan 16	Corbridge	Cargo ship	United Kingdom	3,687	Retained as prize; scuttled 30 Jan 16
11 Jan 16	Farringford	Cargo ship	United Kingdom	3,146	sunk
13 Jan 16	Dromonby	Cargo ship	United Kingdom	3,627	sunk
13 Jan 16	Author	Cargo ship	United Kingdom	3,496	sunk
13 Jan 16	Trader	Cargo ship	United Kingdom	3,608	sunk
15 Jan 16	Ariadne	Cargo ship	United Kingdom	3,035	sunk
15 Jan 16	Appam	Passenger ship	United Kingdom	7,781	Retained as prize; detached 17 Jan 16; returned 28 Mar 17
16 Jan 16	Clan Mactavish	Cargo ship	United Kingdom	5,816	sunk
20 Jan 16	Edinburgh	Sailing ship	United Kingdom	1,473	sunk
4 Feb 16	Luxembourg	Cargo ship	United Kingdom	4,322	sunk
6 Feb 16	Flamenco	Cargo ship	United Kingdom	4,540	sunk
8 Feb 16	Westburn	Cargo ship	United Kingdom	3,300	Retained as prize; detached 9 Feb 16 to Santa Cruz de Tenerife
9 Feb 16	Horace	Cargo ship	United Kingdom	3,109	sunk
24 Feb 16	Maroni	Cargo ship	France	3,109	sunk
25 Feb 16	Saxon Prince	Cargo ship	United Kingdom	3,471	sunk

Sunk by mines from Möwe on her first raiding voyage
Date	Ship	Type	Nationality	Tonnage GRT	Location
6 Jan 16	King Edward VII	Pre-dreadnought battleship	Royal Navy	16,350 t disp	Scotland
13 Jan 16	Bayo	Cargo ship	Spain	2,776	Gironde
13 Jan 16	Belgica	Cargo ship	Spain	2,068	Gironde
22 Feb 16	Duckbridge	Cargo ship	United Kingdom	1,491	Scotland

Ships sunk or captured by Möwe, sailing as Vineta
Date	Ship	Type	Nationality	Tonnage GRT	Fate
27 Jul 16	Eskimo	Cargo ship	United Kingdom	3,326	Taken as a prize

Ships sunk or captured by Möwe on her second raiding voyage
Date	Ship	Type	Nationality	Tonnage GRT	Fate
2 Dec 16	Voltaire	Cargo ship	United Kingdom	8,618	sunk
4 Dec 16	Hallbjørg	Cargo ship	Norway	2,586	sunk
6 Dec 16	Mount Temple	Cargo ship	United Kingdom	9,792	sunk
8 Dec 16	Duchess of Cornwall	Sailing ship	United Kingdom	152	sunk
8 Dec 16	King George	Cargo ship	United Kingdom	3,852	sunk
9 Dec 16	Cambrian Range	Cargo ship	United Kingdom	4,235	sunk
10 Dec 16	Georgic	Cargo ship	United Kingdom	10,077	scuttled and sunk
11 Dec 16	Yarrowdale	Cargo ship	United Kingdom	4,652	retained as prize; detached to Swinemunde, 31 Dec 16. Converted to auxiliary cruiser Leopard
12 Dec 16	Saint Theodore	Cargo ship	United Kingdom	4,992	Commissioned as auxiliary cruiser Geier; scuttled 14 Feb 17
18 Dec 16	Dramatist	Cargo ship	United Kingdom	5,415	sunk
26 Dec 16	Nantes	Sailing ship	France	2,679	sunk
2 Jan 17	Asnieres	Sailing ship	France	3,103	sunk
5 Jan 17	Hudson Maru	Cargo ship	Japan	3,798	sunk/released
7 Jan 17	Radnorshire	Cargo ship	United Kingdom	4,310	sunk
9 Jan 17	Minteh	Cargo ship	United Kingdom	2,890	sunk
10 Jan 17	Netherby Hall	Cargo ship	United Kingdom	4,461	sunk
15 Feb 17	Brecknockshire	Cargo ship	United Kingdom	8,423	sunk
16 Feb 17	French Prince	Cargo ship	United Kingdom	4,766	sunk
16 Feb 17	Eddie	Cargo ship	United Kingdom	2,652	sunk
24 Feb 17	Katherine	Cargo ship	United Kingdom	2,926	sunk
4 Mar 17	Rhodanthe	Cargo ship	United Kingdom	3,061	sunk
10 Mar 17	Esmeraldas	Cargo ship	United Kingdom	4,678	sunk
10 Mar 17	Otaki	Cargo ship	United Kingdom	9,575	sunk in action
13 Mar 17	Demeterton	Cargo ship	United Kingdom	6,048	sunk
14 Mar 17	Governor	Cargo ship	United Kingdom	5,524	sunk

== Film ==
Graf Dohna und seine Möwe (1917)

In 1917 the imperial Bild- und Filmamt in Berlin produced Graf Dohna und seine Möwe, one of the best-known propaganda films of World War I. The distributor was Paul Davidson; part of the production the Projektions-AG »Union« (PAGU), Berlin. The film was first released on 2 May 1917 in the Deutsches Opernhaus (Deutsche Oper Berlin) in Berlin.

== See also ==
- Naval warfare of World War I
